= List of French duck breeds =

This is a list of the duck breeds considered in France to be wholly or partly of French origin. Some may have complex or obscure histories, so inclusion here does not necessarily imply that a breed is predominantly or exclusively French.

Local name(s)	English name(s), if used	Notes	Image
Blanc de l'Allier; Canard de l'Allier			
Canard Cou-Nu			
Kriaxera; Canard Criard			
Canard d'Estaires			
Canard de Bourbourg			
Canard de Duclair			
Canard de Rouen; Rouen Clair; Canard de Rouen Français	Rouen		
Canard de Vouillé les Marais; Canard de Vouillé			
Challandais; Canard de Challans; Nantais			
