= Saxony duck =

Breed of domestic duck

Saxony
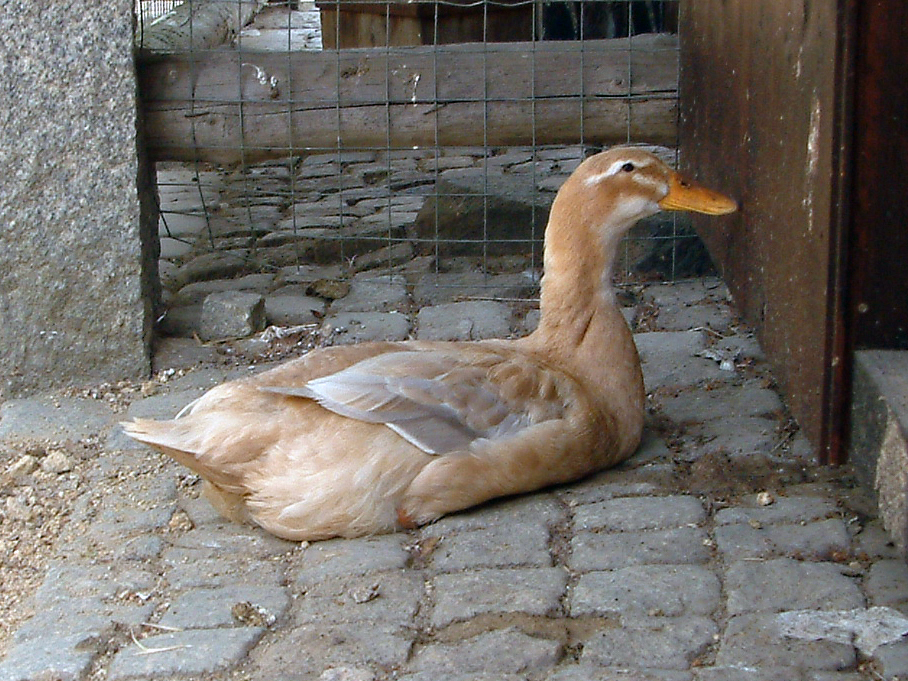
- Duck in Görlitz Zoo, Görlitz, Saxony
- Other names: German: Sachsenente
- Country of origin: Germany
- Use: eggs, meat, fancy

Traits
- Weight: Male: 3.5 kg; Female: 3.0 kg
- Egg color: white

Classification
- APA: heavy duck
- EE: yes
- PCGB: heavy

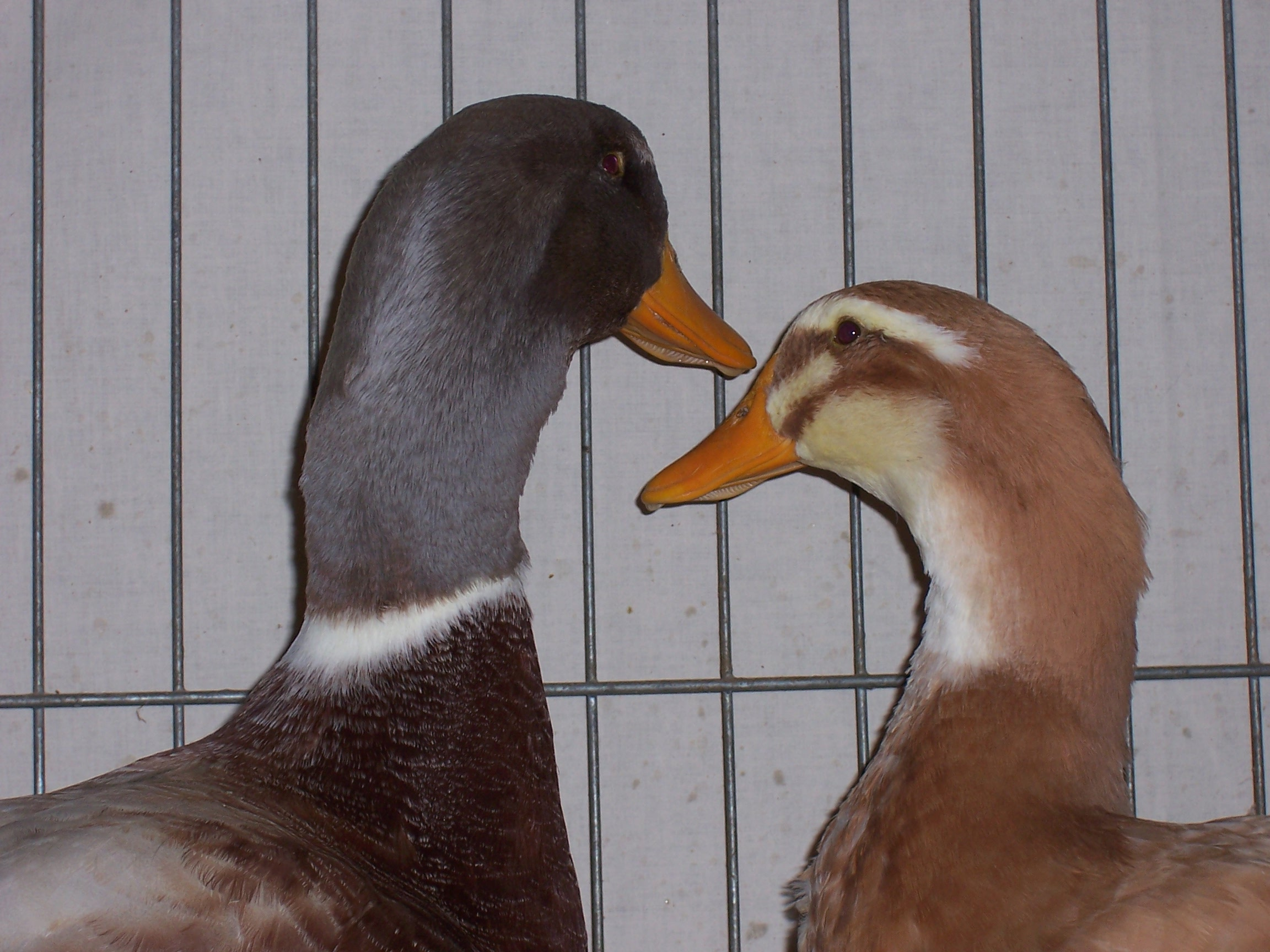
Heads of drake (left) and duck

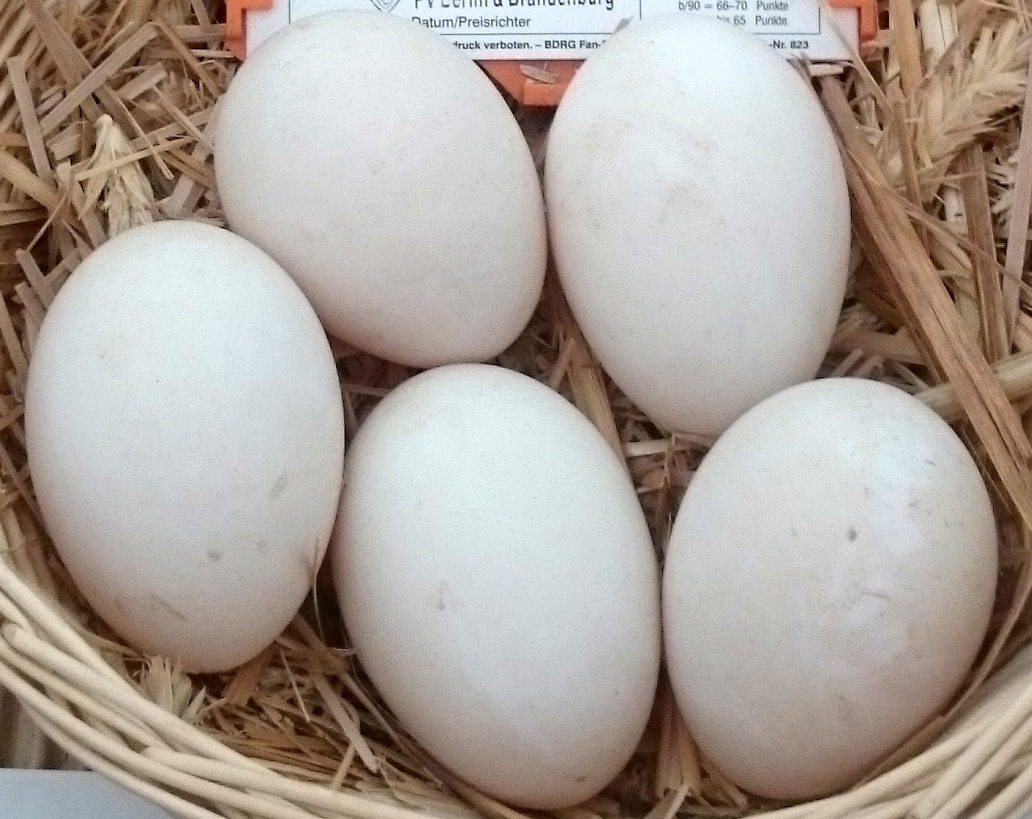
Eggs

The Saxony (German: Sachsenente) is a German breed of domestic duck. It was bred in Saxony in the 1930s, but because of the Second World War was recognised only in 1957.

== History ==
The Saxony was bred in the 1930s by Albert Franz of Chemnitz, in the Free State of Saxony, by cross-breeding of German Pekin with Blue Pomeranian and Rouen birds, and was first shown at Chemnitz-Altendorf in 1934. Almost all of the original stock was lost during World War II. After the War, Franz started breeding again from the remaining stock.

The Saxony was officially recognised in East Germany in 1957, and in West Germany in 1958. Birds were taken to Switzerland in 1965 and to France in 1968. The Saxony was recognised in the United Kingdom in 1982. Some were imported to the United States by David Holderread in 1984; the Saxony was admitted to the Standard of Perfection of the American Poultry Association in 2000.

In 2013 the total number in Germany was 1173. In North America, the breed is listed as "threatened" by the American Livestock Breeds Conservancy.

== Characteristics ==
The Saxony is a heavy duck: drakes weigh about 3.5 kg, ducks about 3.0 kg. It is muscular and close-feathered. Physically, the Saxony resembles the Silver Appleyard. The head is oval-shaped and is moderately large. The Saxony has a deep, full breast with plenty of width that is carried across the back of the bird and extends towards the tail. The abdomen is broad and full, free of keel development as seen in exhibition-type Rouen ducks. The body is held at about 25° to the horizontal.

The Saxony has only one colour variety, buff-blue mallard: (Note: The name "saxony" is used for a recent colour variety of the Indian Runner.) the drake has a greyish-blue head, white neck-ring, and rust- or chestnut-coloured breast feathers; the duck is a rich, light buff colour with two white stripes on each side of the face, one over the eye and the other from the eye towards the beak. Both drakes and ducks have a yellowish bill and orange legs and feet, although the standard specifies dark yellow.

The Saxony forages well and is straightforward to rear.

== Use ==
The Saxony is a dual-purpose breed, reared both for its eggs and for the table. Ducks lay approximately 80 or 100 eggs per year. The eggs are white and weigh some 80 g.
