= List of duck breeds =

This is a list of the breeds of domestic duck which have official recognition at national or international level.

Most breeds of duck derive from the wild mallard, Anas platyrhynchos, while a small minority are descendants of the Muscovy duck, Cairina moschata. Duck breeds are normally officially recognized and described by a national body such as a ministry of agriculture. In some countries they may be recognized by groups of enthusiasts or breeders' associations, which may also draw up a breed standard. Among these are:

- the American Poultry Association in the United States
- the Poultry Club of Great Britain
- the Entente Européenne d'Aviculture et de Cuniculture in Europe
- the Australian Poultry Standards

== A ==
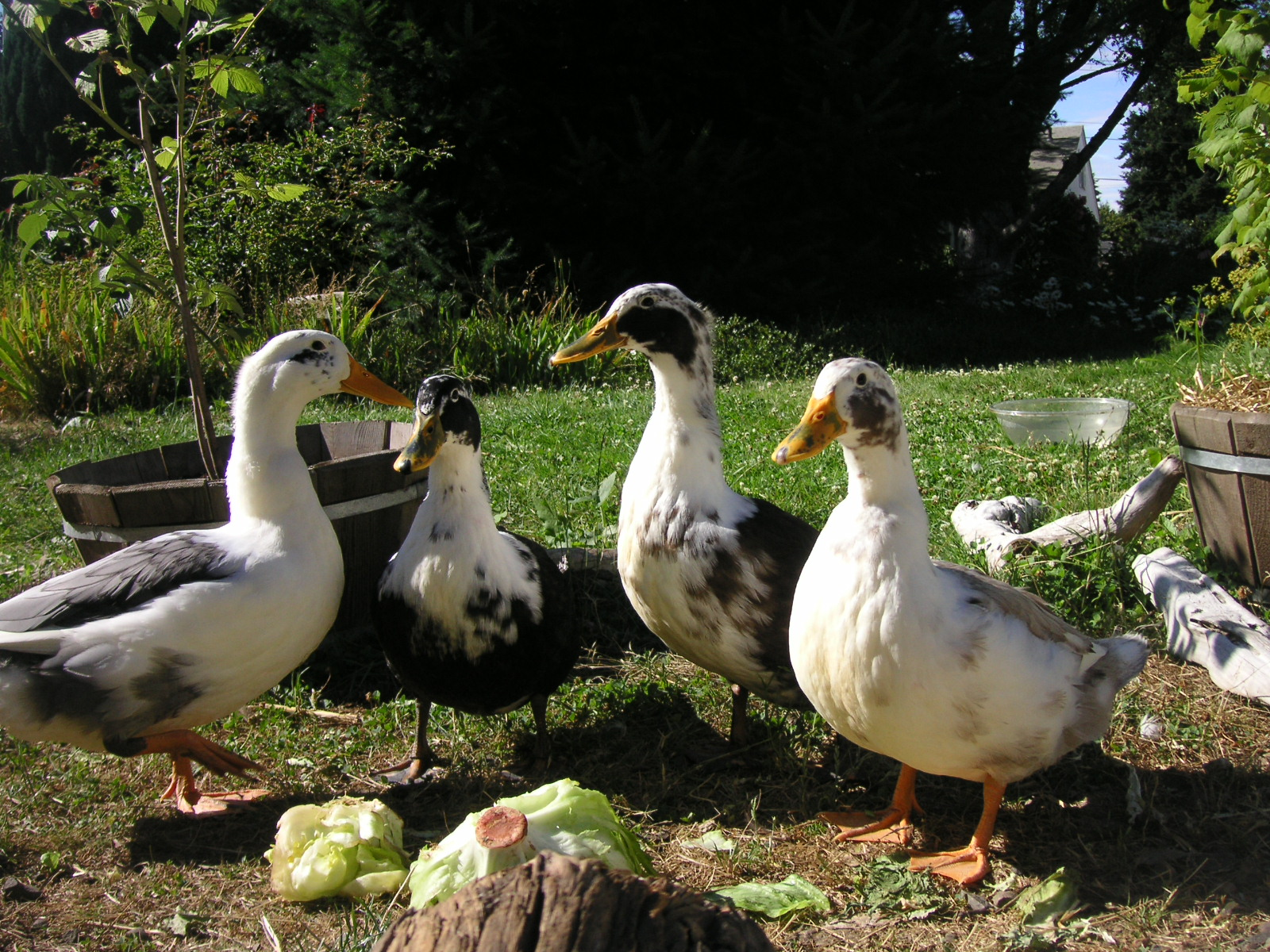
Ancona duck

- Abacot Ranger (also known as Streicher)
- African duck
- Alabio duck
- Allier duck
- American Pekin
- Ancona duck
- Antigua and Barbuda duck
- Appleyard
- Australian Call
- Australian Spotted
- Aylesbury duck

== B ==
- Bac Kinh duck
- Bali duck
- Bashkir duck
- Bau duck (also known as Ta Duck)
- Blekinge duck
- Bourbourg duck

== C ==
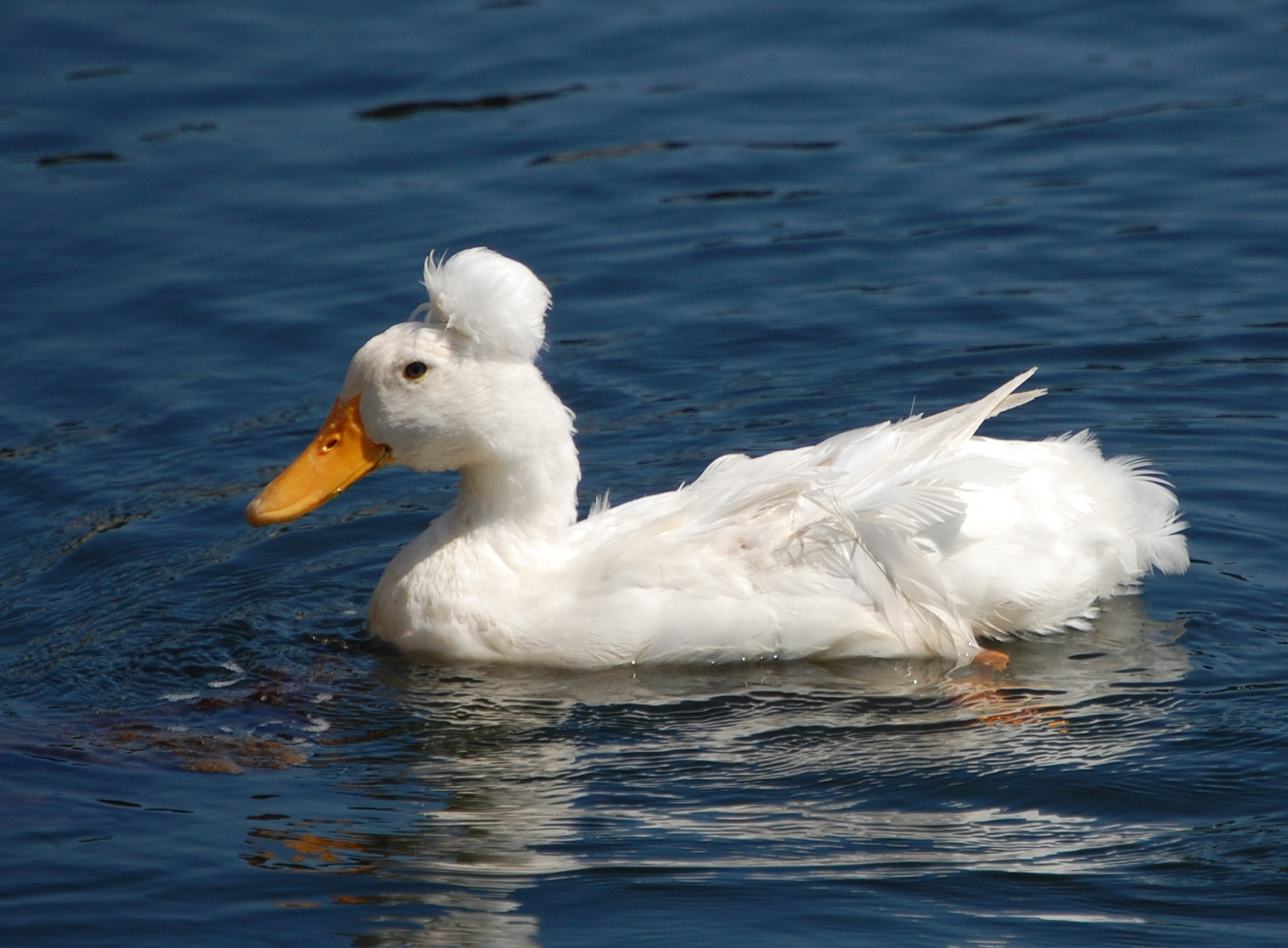
Crested duck

- Call duck
- Cayuga duck
- Challandais
- Chara-Chemballi duck
- Crested duck

== D ==
- Danish duck
- Dendermond duck
- Deshi Black
- Deshi White
- Duclair duck

== E ==
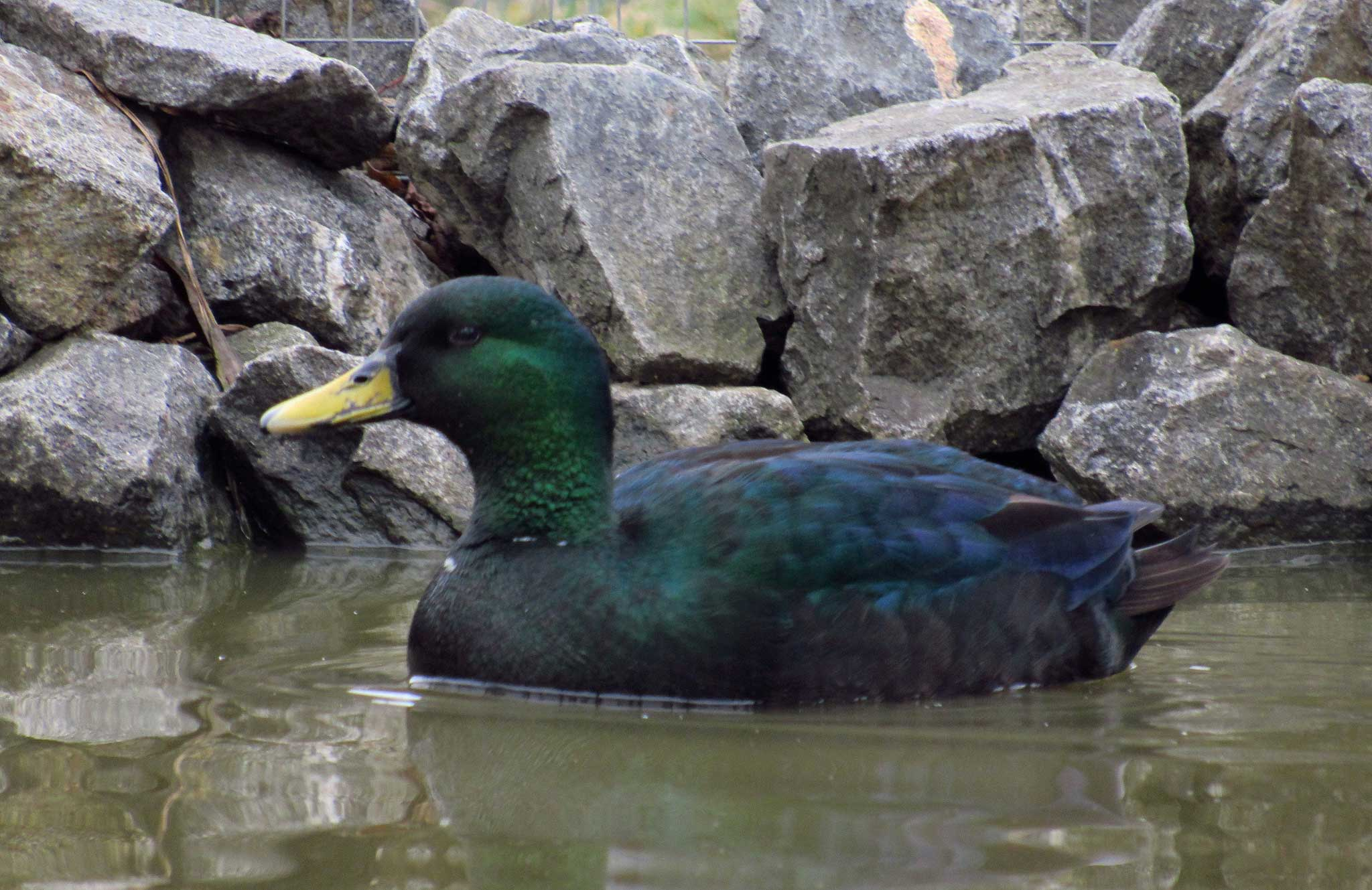
East Indie

- East Indie
- Elizabeth duck
- Estaires duck

== F ==
- Faroese duck
- Forest duck

== G ==
- German Pekin
- Germanata Veneta
- Gimbsheimer duck
- Golden Cascade
- Grimao Ermaôs

== H ==
- Haut-Volant duck
- Havanna duck
- Herve duck
- Hook Bill
- Hungarian duck
- Huttegem duck

== I ==
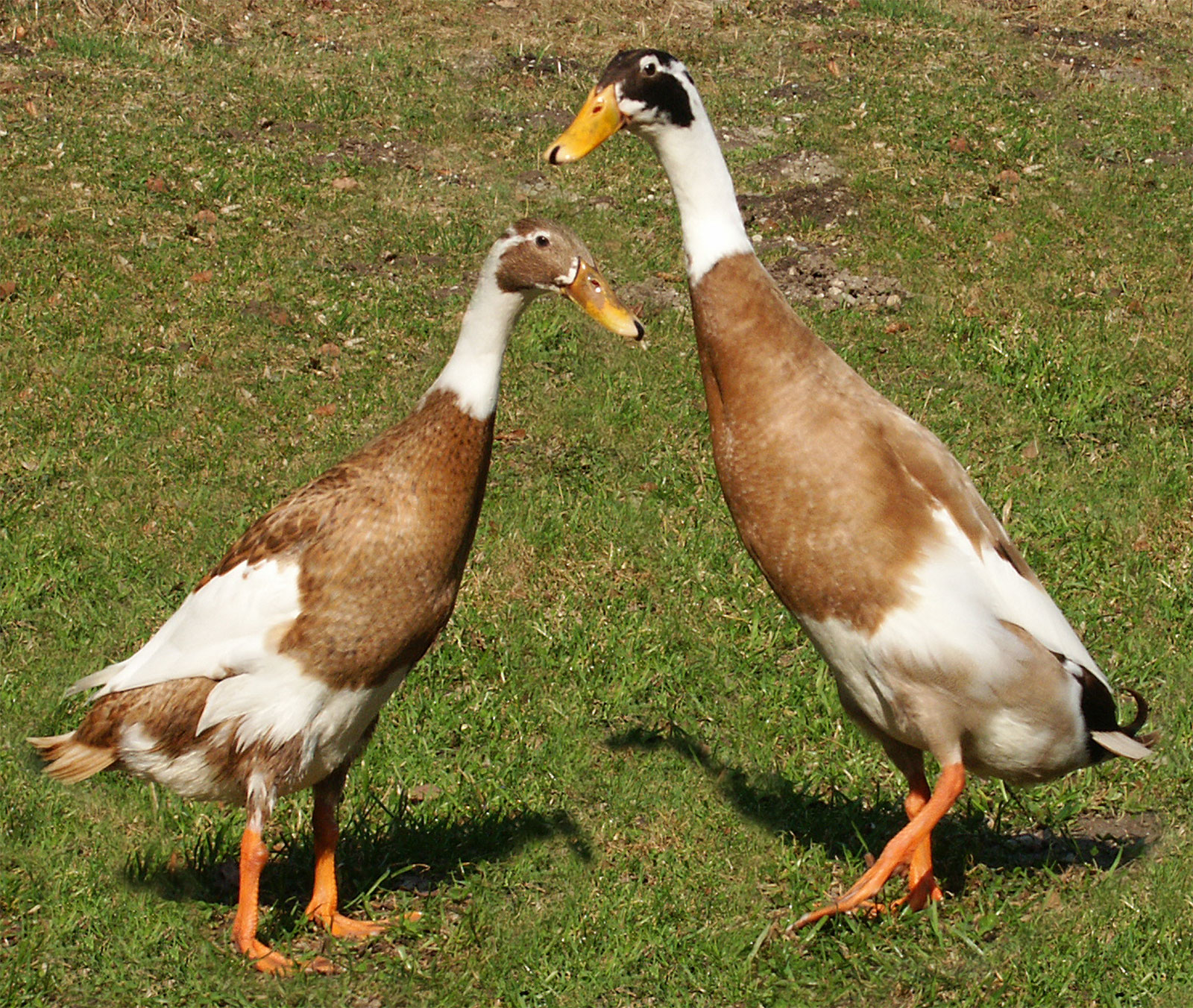
Indian Runner duck

- Idegem duck
- Indian Runner duck

== J ==
- Japanice Criollo
- Jending

== K ==
- Kaiya duck (hybrid; Pekin × Tsaiya)
- Khaki Campbell

== L ==
- Laplaigne

== M ==
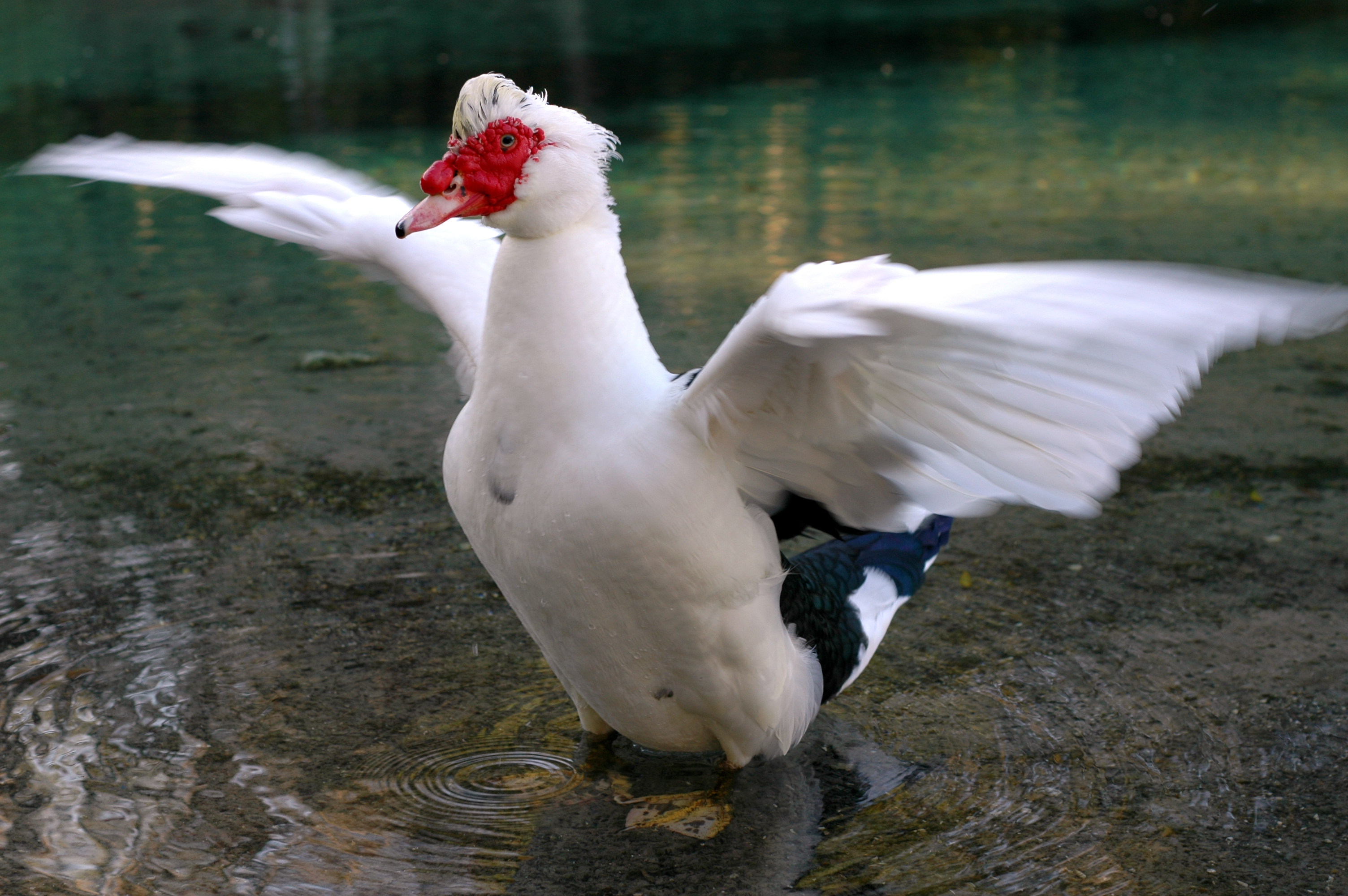
Muscovy duck

- Magpie duck
- Merchtem duck
- Mulard
- Muscovy duck (culinarily known as Barbary)

== N ==
- Naked Neck duck

== O ==
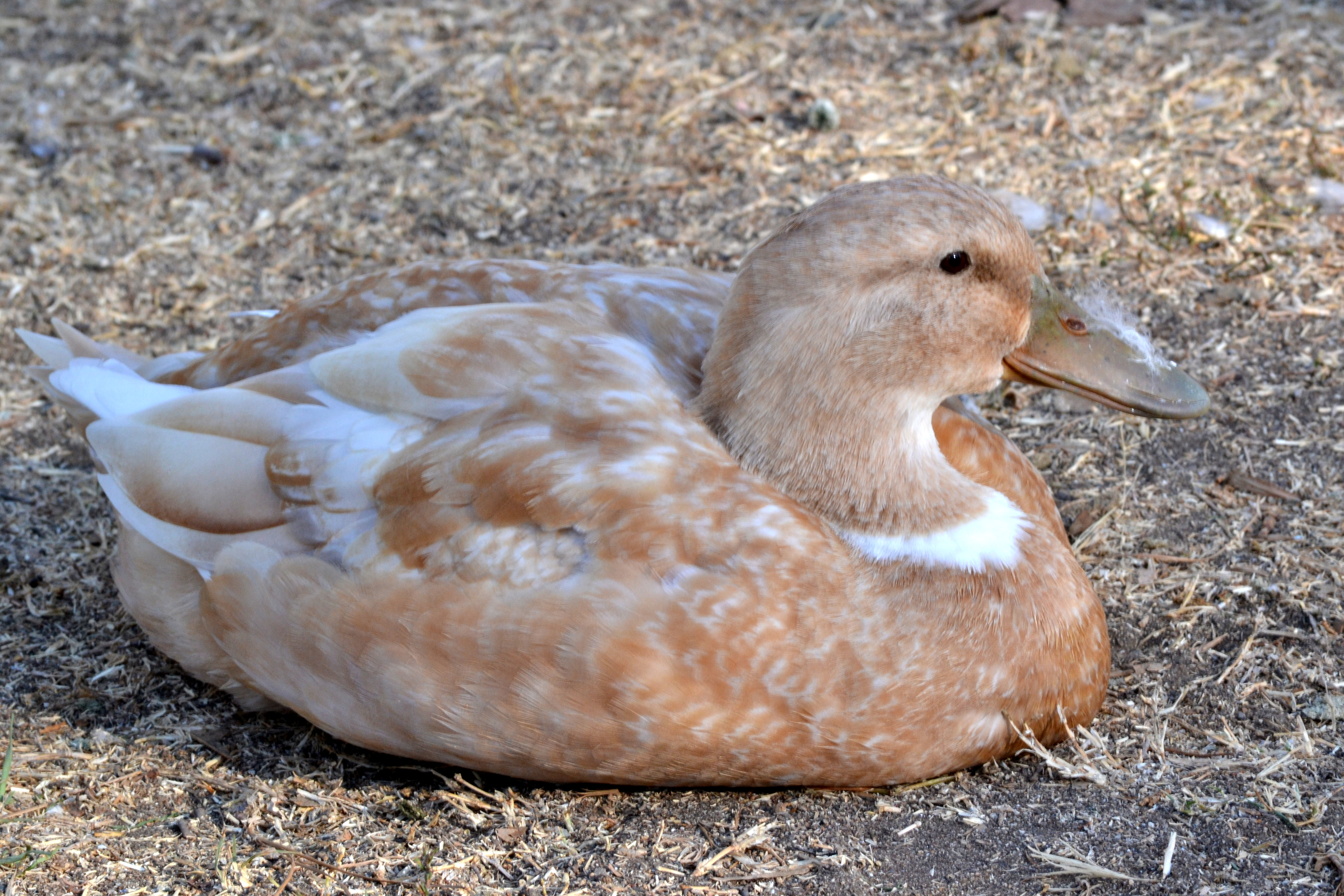
Orpington Duck

- Orpington Duck
- Overberg Duck

== P ==
- Pomeranian duck
- Pond duck

== R ==
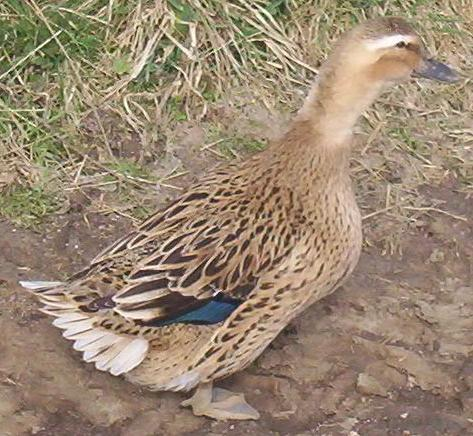
Rouen Clair duck

- Rouen duck

== S ==
- Saxony duck
- Semois duck
- Shetland duck
- Silver Appleyard
- Silver Bantam
- Swedish Blue
- Swedish Yellow duck

== T ==
- Tea Ankam
- Tea Kapa
- Termonde duck
- Tsaiya Duck

== U ==
- Ukrainian Clay duck
- Ukrainian Grey duck
- Ukrainian White duck

== V ==
- Venetian duck
- Vouillé duck

== W ==
- Watervale duck
- Welsh Harlequin
- West Indian duck
- White-breasted black duck
