= Hook Bill =

Breed of domestic duck

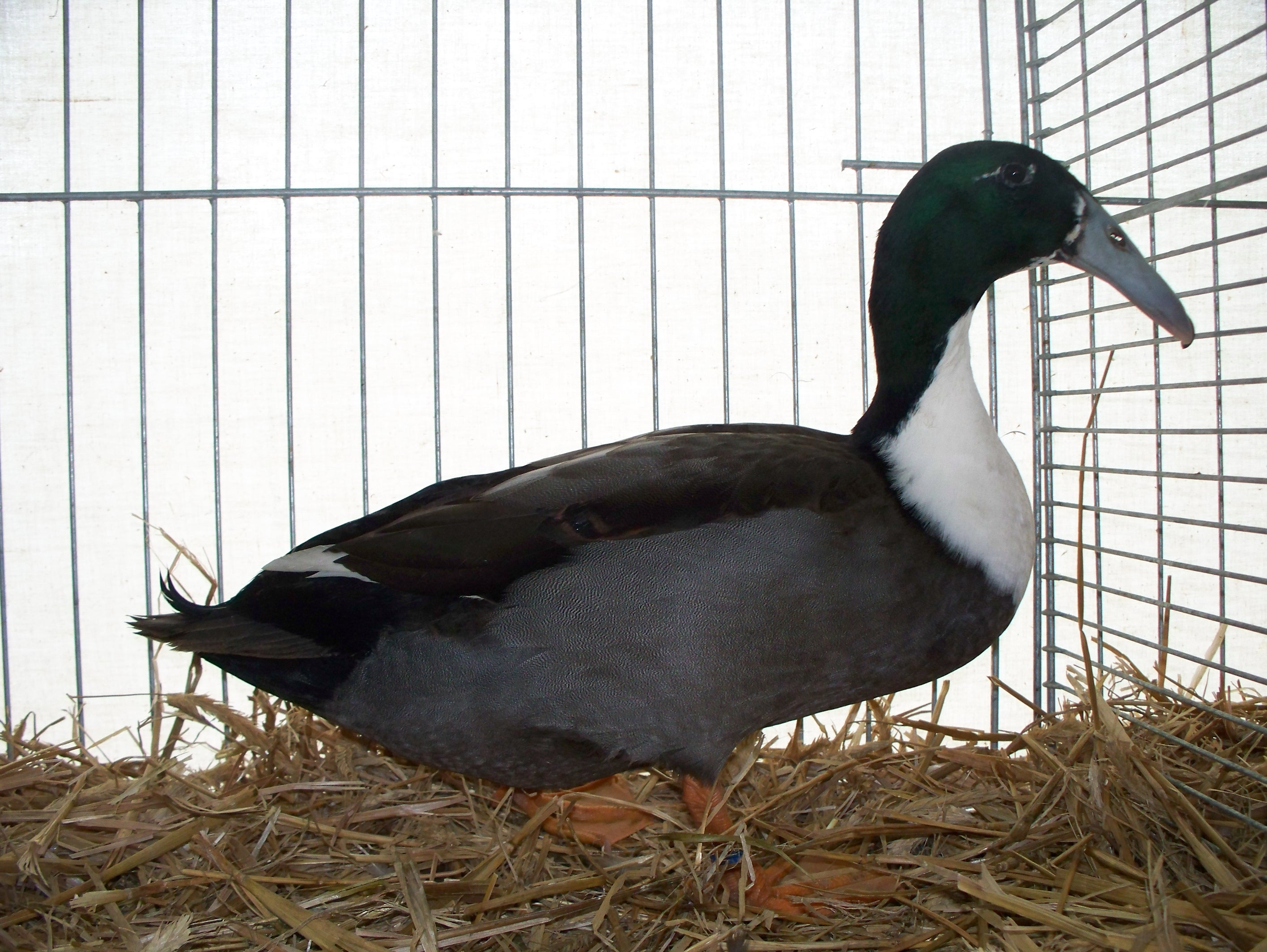
- Drake
- Conservation status: FAO (2007): endangered; DAD-IS (2020): at risk; SZH (2020): critical
- Other names: Kromsnaveleend; Krombekeend; Noord Hollandse Krombekeend; Dutch Hookbill; Hook-billed Duck
- Country of origin: Netherlands

Traits
- Weight: Male: 2.0–2.25 kg; Female: 1.6–2.0 kg

Classification
- APA: no
- EE: yes
- PCGB: light

Notes
- may be crested

The Hook Bill or Dutch Hookbill (Dutch: Kromsnaveleend or Krombekeend), is a Dutch breed of domestic duck, named for its unusual down-curved beak. It is documented in both text and images from the late seventeenth century onwards. It originated in the province of North Holland, and so may also be known as the Noord Hollandse Krombekeend. Speculation that it originated in Asia, or is related to the Indian Runner, is apparently unsubstantiated.

== History ==
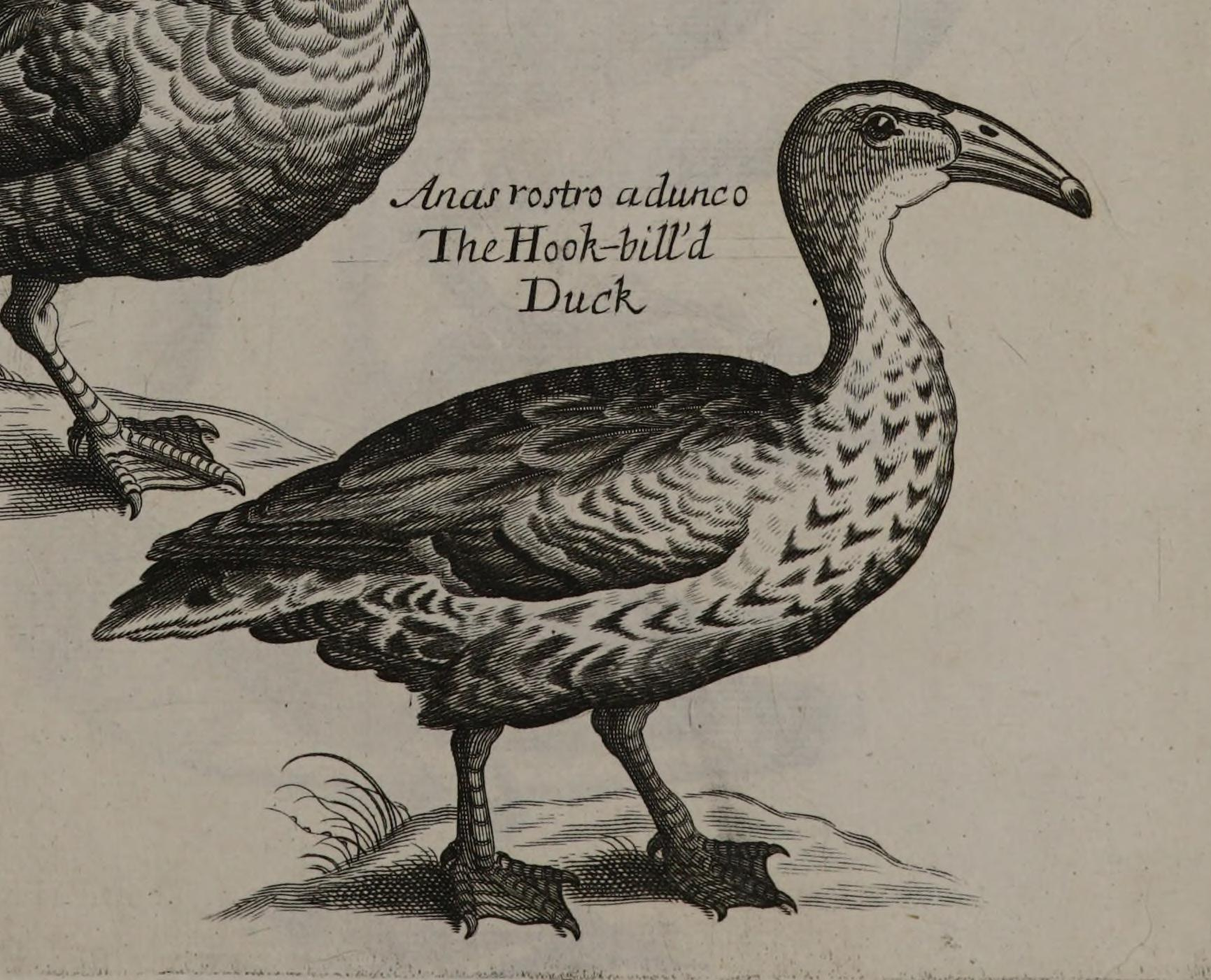
"The Hook-bill'd Duck", copper engraving by Lady Emma Willughby, from Ornithologiæ Libri Tres by Francis Willughby, 1676

The Hook Bill is associated with the province of North Holland in the north-west of the Netherlands, but its origins are unknown. Speculation that it originated in Asia, or is related to the Indian Runner, is apparently unsubstantiated.

Hook-billed ducks appear in paintings by Melchior Hondecoeter and Nicolas Robert from the latter half of the seventeenth century. The earliest published illustration and description appear to be those in the Ornithologiæ Libri Tres of Francis Willughby, published in 1676. Willughby's book is in Latin; when it was re-published by John Ray in English in 1678, the description of the Hook-billed Duck was:

In shape of body and outward lineaments it is very like the common tame Duck; differs chiefly in the Bill, which is broad, something longer than the common Ducks, and bending moderately downward. The Head also is lesser and slenderer than the common Ducks. It is said to be a better layer.

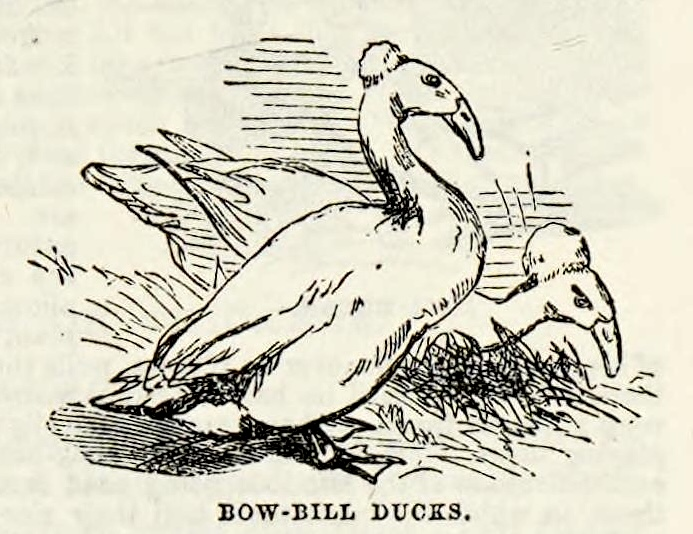
Line drawing by Harrison Weir from Beeton's Book of Household Management, 1861

In the nineteenth century the Hook Bill was present in large numbers in much of Europe. Johann Matthäus Bechstein, in the second volume of his Gemeinnützige Naturgeschichte Deutschlands nach allen drey Reichen, describes it as common throughout the continent, and particularly so in Thuringia, where large flocks were kept for their eggs and meat. It was present in England no later than about 1840, when Harrison Weir reported seeing the birds on the lake of the Surrey Zoological Gardens in Newington, at that time in Surrey.

Numbers declined during the twentieth century – for reasons including water pollution and falling demand for duck eggs – and by 1980 the breed was close to extinction. A recovery initiative was launched with about fifteen of the remaining birds. A census in 2010 found a population of about 120; in 2023 the total number was estimated at 80–120, with 60 breeding ducks and 20 drakes.

In 2007 the conservation status of the Hook Bill was listed by the FAO as "endangered" at European level. In 2024 its status in Holland was listed in DAD-IS as "critical-maintained", while the Dutch Stichting Zeldzame Huisdierrassen classified it as "critical", as did the Livestock Conservancy in the United States. It was not on the rare breed watchlist of the Rare Breeds Survival Trust in the United Kingdom.

Some were taken to Germany in the 1980s. It was introduced to the United States in 2000; it is not listed in the Standard of Perfection of the American Poultry Association.

== Characteristics ==
The Hook Bill is a light duck, with an average weight of approximately 2 kg. Three colour variants are recognised in France, the Netherlands and the United Kingdom: the dusky mallard has a black head and rump with green lustre, the body in shades of grey with no white neck-ring, and a slate-grey beak; the white-bibbed dusky mallard is similarly coloured, but with a distinct white chest-bib and white-tipped wing primaries; the white has pure white plumage, blue eyes, bright orange legs and a flesh-pink bill. A further seventeen colours are listed for Germany by the Entente Européenne, but are not accepted in the European standard.

== Use ==
The Hook Bill was traditionally widely reared for both eggs and meat; some were also kept for ornament. The birds were managed extensively, foraging freely along canals and waterways. In the twenty-first century it is bred mainly for exhibition; ducks lay well, and may give between 100 and 225 white or greenish-blue eggs per year.
