= Bali duck =

Indonesian breed of duck

Bali
- Conservation status: FAO (2007): no data; DAD-IS (2026): unknown; RBST (UK) (2026): not listed
- Country of origin: Indonesia
- Distribution: United Kingdom

Traits
- Weight: Male: 2.3 kg; Female: 1.8 kg
- Egg colour: from white to blue-green
- Colour: any

Classification
- APA: no
- EE: listed, not recognised
- PCGB: light
- duck; Anas platyrhynchos

The Bali – also known as the Balinese Crested or Crested Runner – is a rare Indonesian breed of lightweight domestic duck. It is a light duck with an upright stance, broadly similar in most respects to the Indian Runner, but distinguished from it by a slightly heavier build and the presence of a small ball-shaped crest on the back of the head. (Note: Like almost all domesticated duck breeds, the Bali derives from the wild mallard, Anas platyrhynchos.)

== History ==
Crested birds were sometimes seen in the large flocks of ducks reared in Indonesia and other parts of South-East Asia. Some crested ducks of Indian Runner type were imported from Malaya to the United Kingdom in 1925 by a Miss Chisholm and a Miss Davidson. Miss Chisholm called them 'Bali' as she believed they were indigenous to that Indonesian island. The Bali was recognised as a breed by the Poultry Club of Great Britain in 1930, and the breed standard was included in the British Poultry Standards in 1954 and again in 1982; however, doubts were expressed as to whether any of the birds remained. Stock was re-created in the 1980s and 1990s by cross-breeding Indian Runners with Crested birds.

The Bali is both recognised and reported to DAD-IS by two countries: Indonesia and the United Kingdom. It is listed, but not recognised, by the Entente Européenne d'Aviculture et de Cuniculture.

In the twenty-first century its conservation status is uncertain: no population numbers have ever been reported to DAD-IS by Indonesia, while an estimated population of 0–100 was reported by the United Kingdom for 2002; in 2026 its conservation status was shown as 'unknown' for both countries. It is not among the breeds on the 2026/2027 watchlist of the Rare Breeds Survival Trust.

== Characteristics ==
It is a light duck: median weights are 1.8 kg for ducks and 2.3 kg for drakes. It is in most respects morphologically similar to the Indian Runner and to the related Tegal and Mojosari breeds of Indonesia – it is a slender bird with an upright stance and flat head with high-set eyes, and moves at a fast run. The main distinction from the Runner is the presence of a ball-shaped crest on the back of the head; other differences are a slightly heavier build in the body and a slightly less delicate head.

The breed standard of the Poultry Club of Great Britain allows for the birds to be of any colour; a description is given only of the white, which has white plumage, an orange-yellow bill, orange webs and legs, and blue eyes.

== Use ==
The birds are most commonly kept for exhibition. Ducks may lay some 120 to 250 eggs per year, varying in colour from white to blue-green.
