= Ancona duck =

Breed of domestic duck

Ancona
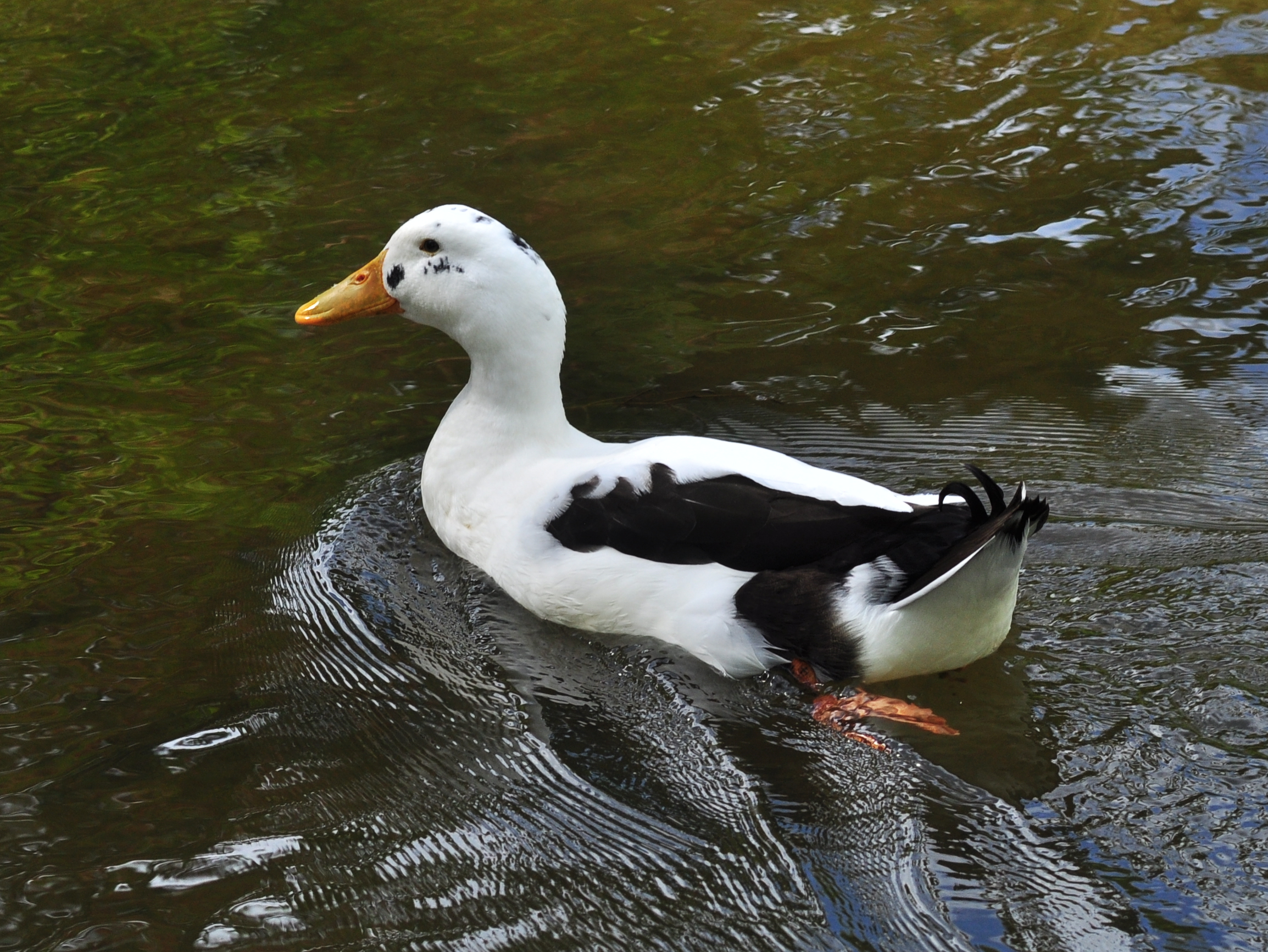
- In Wright Park, Tacoma, Washington
- Conservation status: FAO (2007): not listed; The Livestock Conservancy: watch; Rare Breeds Survival Trust: not listed
- Country of origin: United Kingdom; United States

Traits
- Weight: 2.3–2.9 kg (5–6.5 lb)
- Egg color: variable

Classification
- APA: not recognised
- EE: not recognised
- PCGB: not recognised

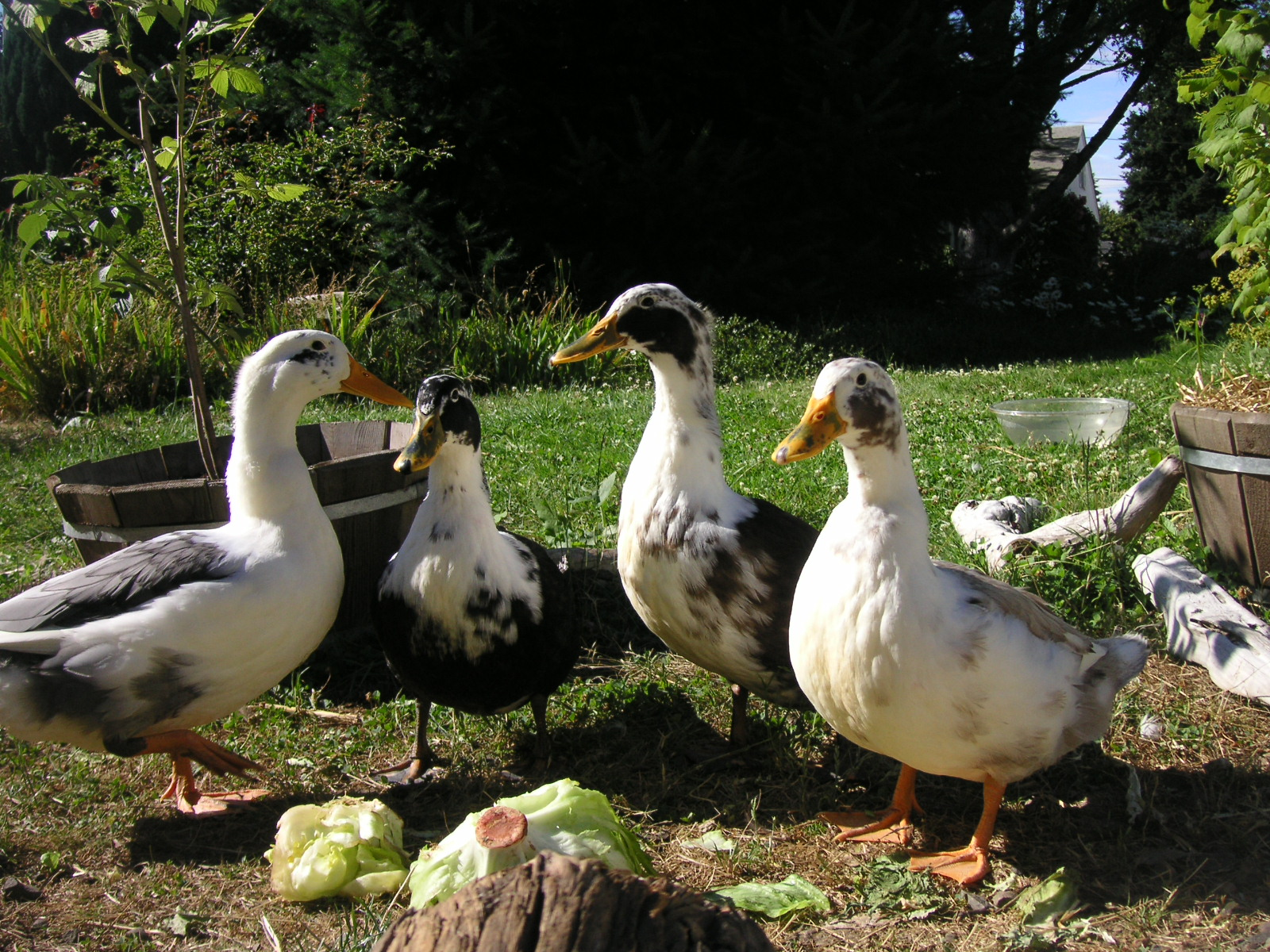
Ancona ducks

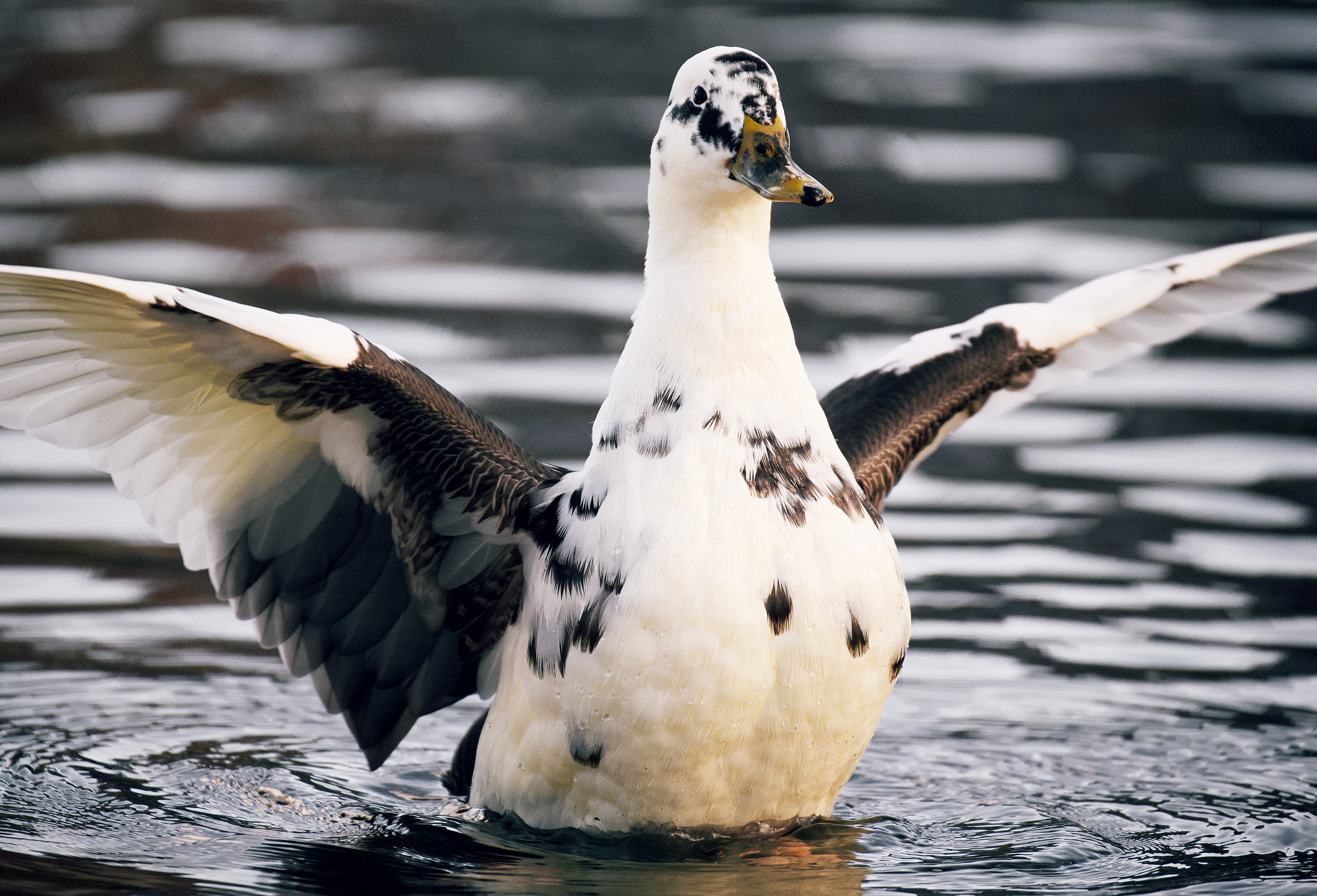
Ancona duck flapping its wings

The Ancona is a breed of domestic duck, characterised by an unusual and variable broken-colored plumage pattern. It is not clear whether it originated in the United Kingdom or in the United States. It is not recognised or listed by the American Poultry Association, by the Entente Européenne d'Aviculture et de Cuniculture, or by the Poultry Club of Great Britain.

== History ==
It usually reported that the Ancona was first bred in England in the early twentieth century, probably from the same stock that gave rise to the Magpie, and was introduced to the United States in or before the 1970s where it was first shown in 1983. However, an article in the Water Fowl Club of America Yearbook of 1913 reports that a duck of the same name had been developed by one W.J. Wirt, of Knowlesville, New York, who had named it after the Ancona breed of chicken. Birds of this type were shown in subsequent years, and took two first prizes at a poultry show in Boston in 1915. The Livestock Conservancy does not give any description of these early American Anconas, or any comparison to the modern breed of that name.

== Characteristics ==
The Ancona is of medium size, and weighs about 2.3–2.9 kg (5–6.5 lb). It has an oval head, a slightly concave bill. The plumage is broken-colored, with irregular patches of color on a white ground. The usual color is black and white; other color varieties are: blue and white, chocolate and white, silver and white, and lavender and white. The bill is yellow, spotted with black or dark green, and the shanks are orange, marked with black or brown.

It forages well, is hardy, and is capable of adapting to different environmental conditions.

== Use ==
The Ancona is a good layer, producing some 210–280 eggs per year; these may be blue, green, white, spotted, cream, or tinted.
