= East Indie =

Breed of ornamental bantam duck

East Indies
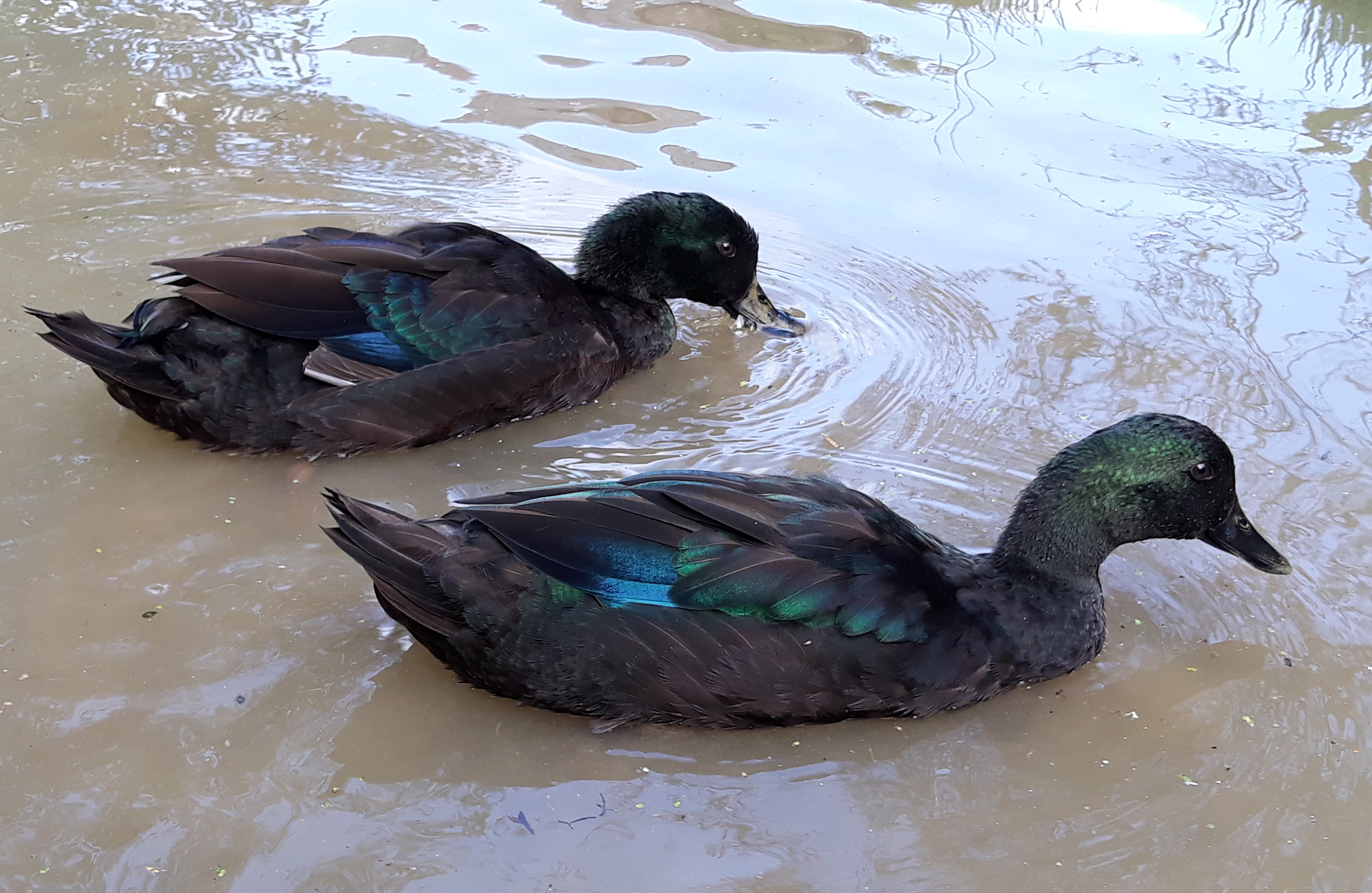
- Young ducks

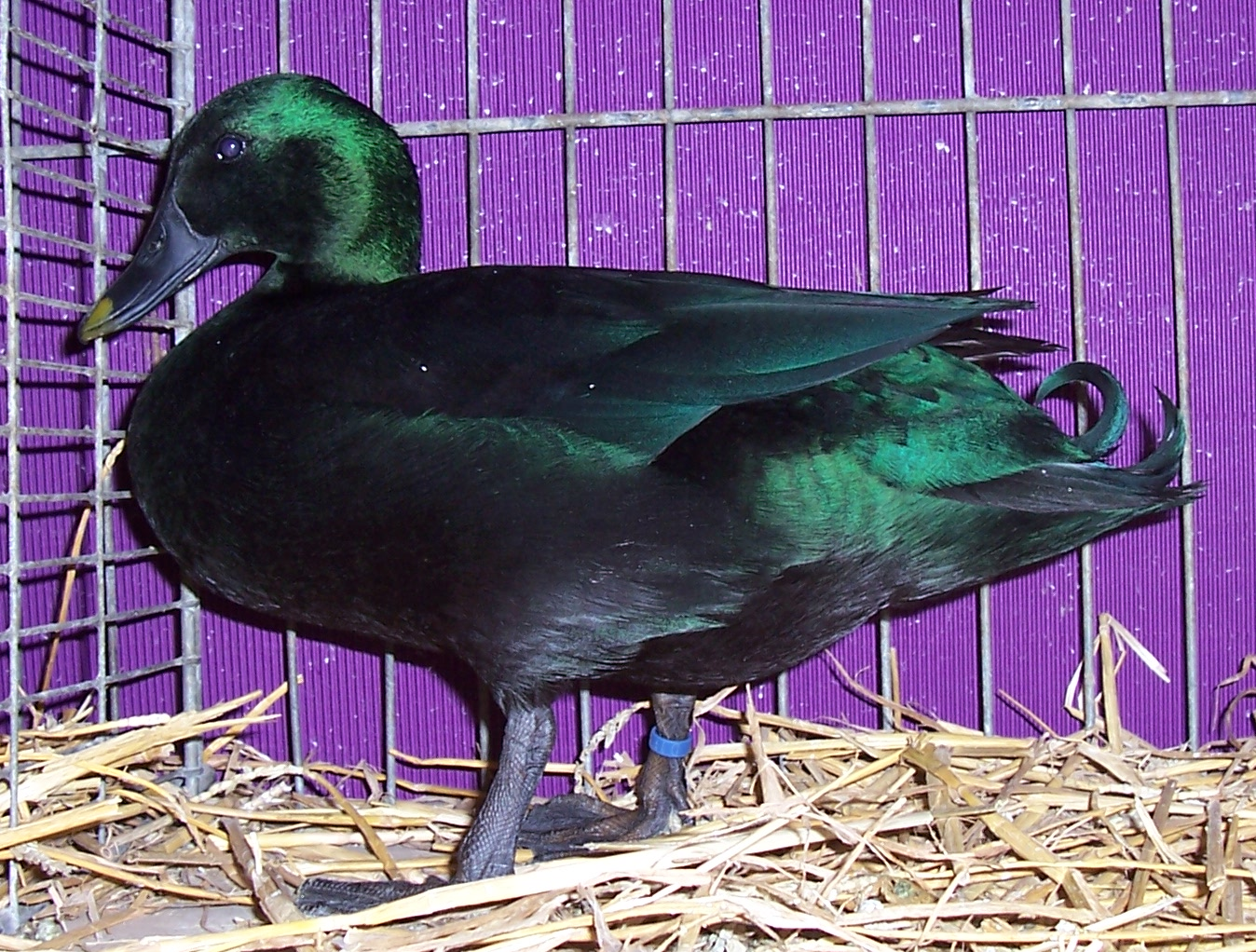
- A drake
- Conservation status: FAO (2007): endangered
- Other names: Black East Indian; Black East Indies; Brazilian; Buenos Aires; Emerald; Labrador
- Country of origin: United States
- Distribution: international
- Use: ornamental

Traits
- Weight: Male: 0.9 kg; Female: 0.7–0.8 kg

Classification
- APA: bantam duck
- EE: yes
- PCGB: bantam and call ducks

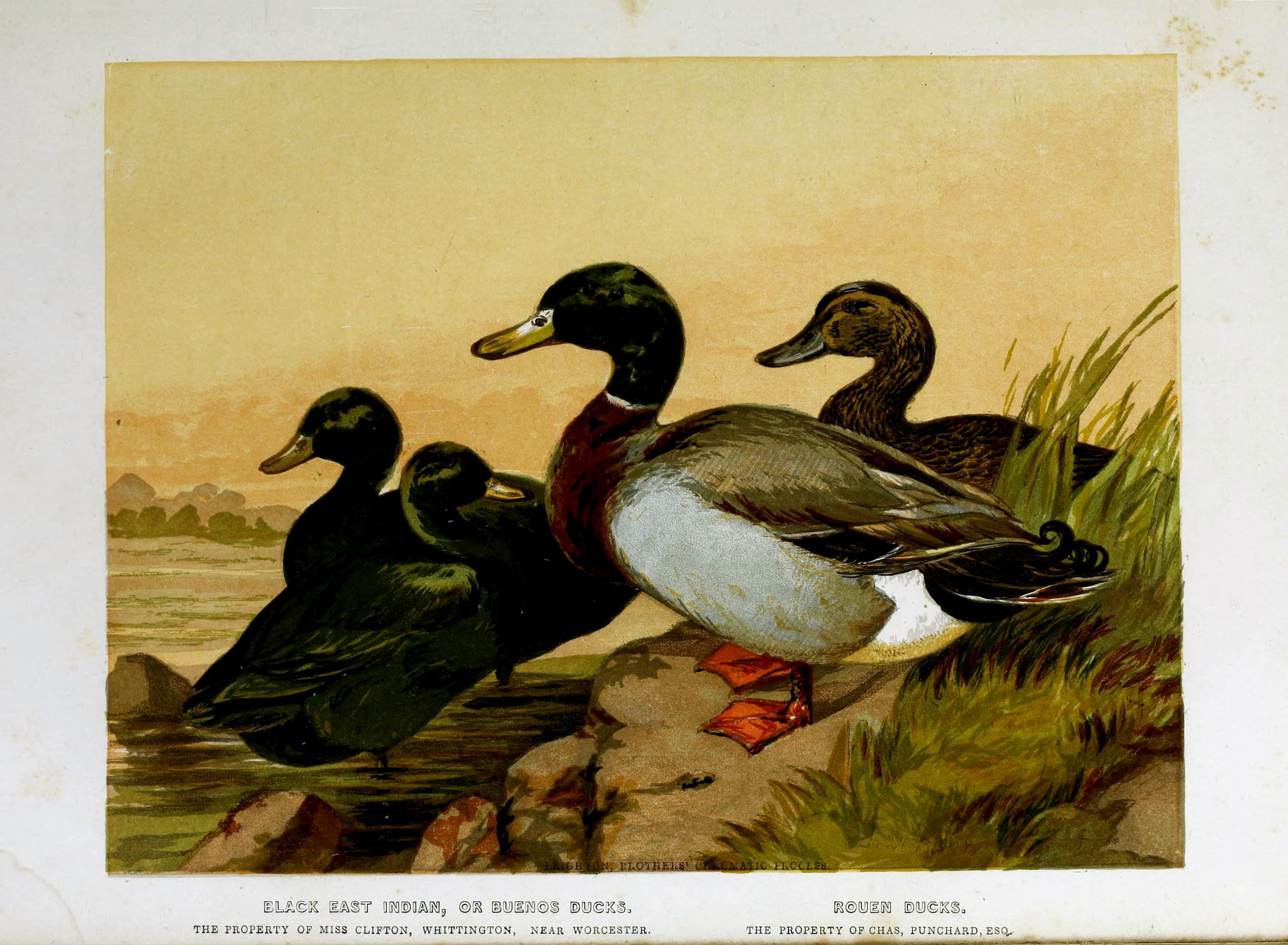
Black East Indian and Rouen Ducks, illustration by Harrison Weir in The Poultry Book, 1853

The East Indie or Black East Indian is an ornamental breed of domestic duck. It is a bantam breed, and is thought to have originated in the United States.

== History ==
The East Indie is the oldest breed of bantam duck. It is thought to have originated in the United States, but its precise origin is not known. It has at various times been known by other names, some of them – such as "Brazilian", "Buenos Airean", "Labrador" – suggesting a geographical origin. There is, however, no documented connection to the East Indies, to South America, or to Labrador. It is thought that the breed developed from its original form in the United Kingdom in the second half of the nineteenth century, and was then further refined in the United States in the latter part of the twentieth century. A hypothesis that the black color of the plumage derives from the native American species Anas rubripes appears to be unsubstantiated.

Black East Indians were imported to the United Kingdom in or before 1831, supposedly from Buenos Aires, and were housed in the Zoological Gardens of the Zoological Society of London; they were at first called "Buenos Aireans". Others were at Knowsley Hall, home of the Earls of Derby, in about 1850. In 1853 the Black East Indian was described in the Poultry Book of William Wingfield and George William Johnson, with an illustration by Harrison Weir. It was included in the original Standard of Excellence in Exhibition Poultry of William Bernhard Tegetmeier in 1865, and – as the Black Indie – in the first Standard of Perfection of the American Poultry Association in 1874.

== Characteristics ==
The East Indie is a bantam breed, usually weighing under 1 kg. It has very dark, lustrous greenish-black plumage and a black bill. Ducks may sometimes develop white feathers as they age; drakes that do so should not be used for breeding. It flies well unless the wings are clipped. It is generally shyer and quieter than the Call Duck.

== Use ==
The East Indie is largely kept by fanciers for exhibition or ornament. It may be helpful in pest control in gardens.
