= Blue Duck (disambiguation) =

The blue duck (Hymenolaimus malacorhynchos) is a species of duck, endemic to New Zealand.

Blue Duck may also refer to:

- Blue Duck (outlaw) (1858?–1895), an outlaw of the American Old West
- Blue Duck (Lonesome Dove series), a fictional character
- Blue Duck River, a river in New Zealand
- Blue Duck (missile), anti-submarine warfare missile, entered service as the Ikara
- The Blue Duck Inn, a historic hotel in Australia

== See also ==
- Swedish Blue, a breed of domesticated duck
- Blue-billed duck (Oxyura australis), an Australian stiff-tailed duck
