= Ancona (disambiguation) =

Ancona is a city in Italy.

Ancona may also refer to:

== Places ==
- Province of Ancona, the Italian province that includes the city
- Republic of Ancona, a medieval commune and maritime republic around the city
- Ancona, Victoria, a town in Australia
- Ancona, Alberta, a locale in Canada
- Ancona, Illinois, a town in the US

== Ships ==
- MV Ancona (1966–2010), a ferry operated on a service linking Ancona, Italy to Split, Croatia
- SMS Graudenz (1913), a light cruiser of the Imperial German Navy, ceded to Italy and renamed RN Ancona, 1919–1937
- SS Ancona (1908–1915), Italian passenger steamer, sunk by a U-boat during World War I
- SS Arabia (1897), renamed Barcelona 1899, seized by Italy and renamed SS Ancona, 1915–1924

== Other ==
- Ancona (surname)
- Ancona chicken, a breed of chicken
- Ancona duck, a breed of duck
