= Pomeranian duck =

Breed of duck

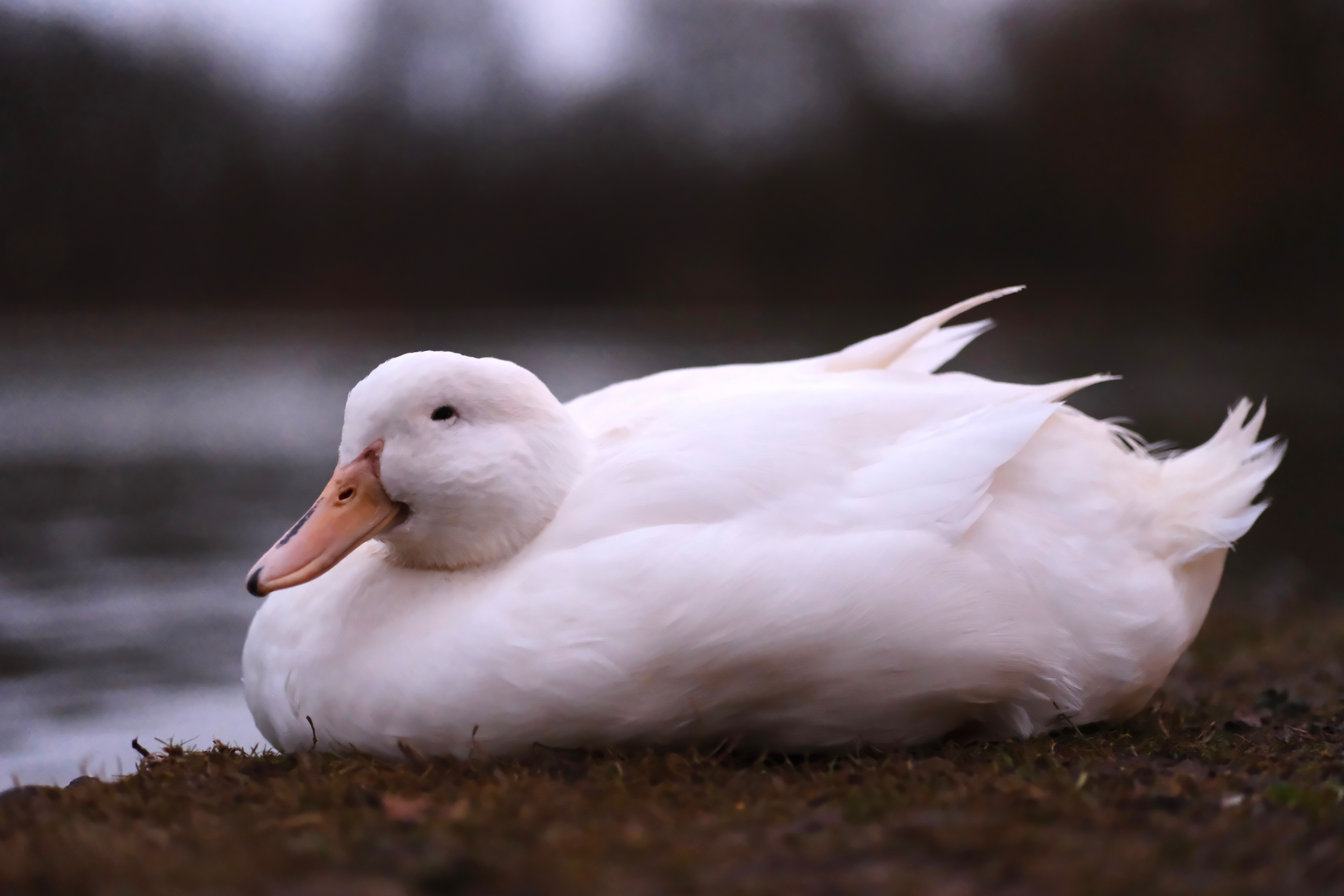
White Pomeranian Duck

The Pomeranian or Pommern duck (in German Pommernente) is a breed of domesticated duck. It is a landrace originating in the German part of the Baltic Sea coast region called Pomerania. Pomeranian ducks share the same ancestors with other northern European duck breeds, such as the Shetland duck and Swedish Blue duck.

== Description ==
The Pomeranian duck is a medium-sized bird, male weighs 3 kg; the female usually weighs 2.5 kg. The body is traditionally black or blue with a white breast. They have dark (preferably black) beaks and feet and dark brown eyes. They produce 70-100 eggs per year of 80-90 grams weight.

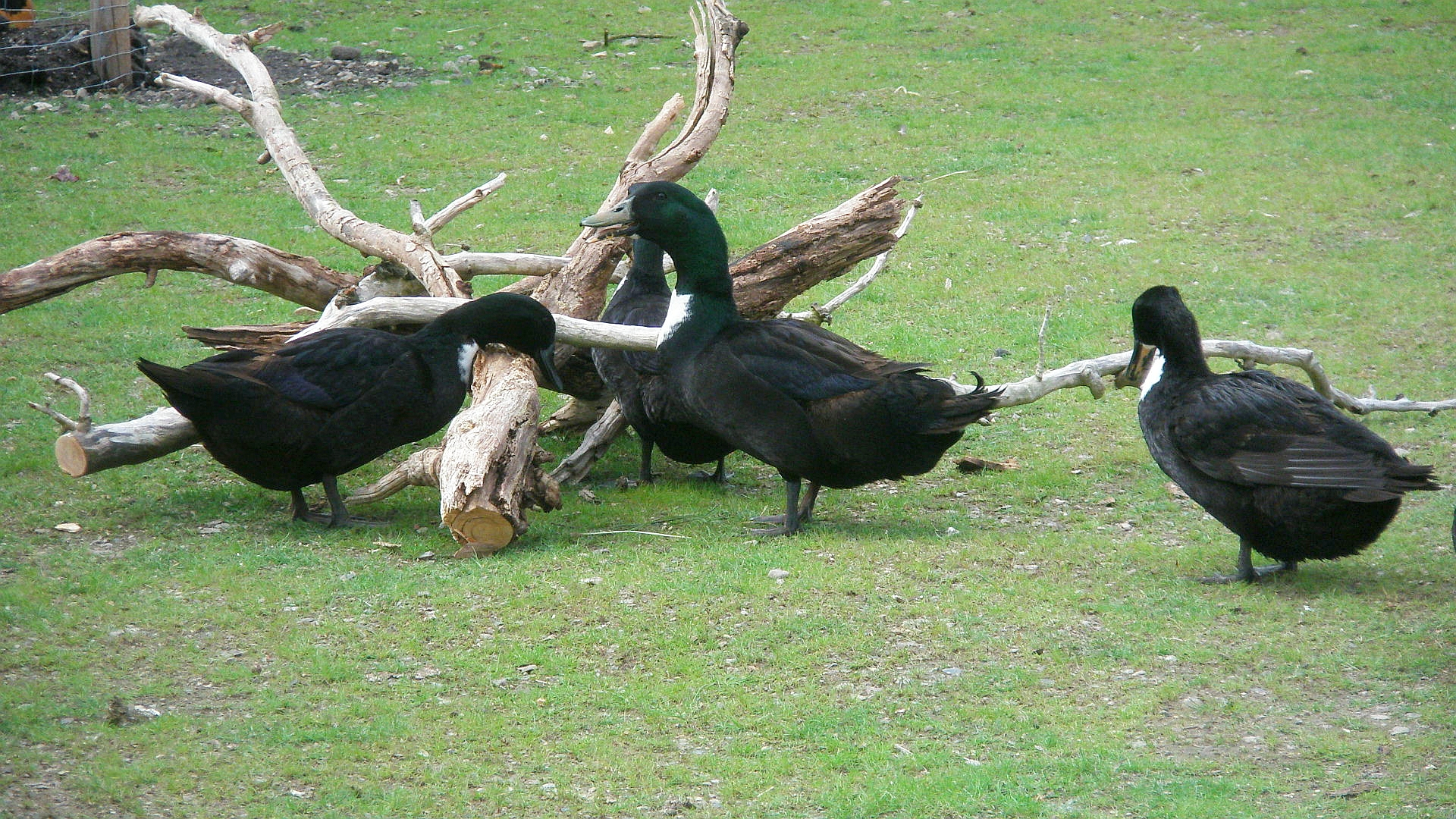

== See also ==
- List of duck breeds
