= Canard de Bourbourg =

French breed of duck

Bourbourg duck
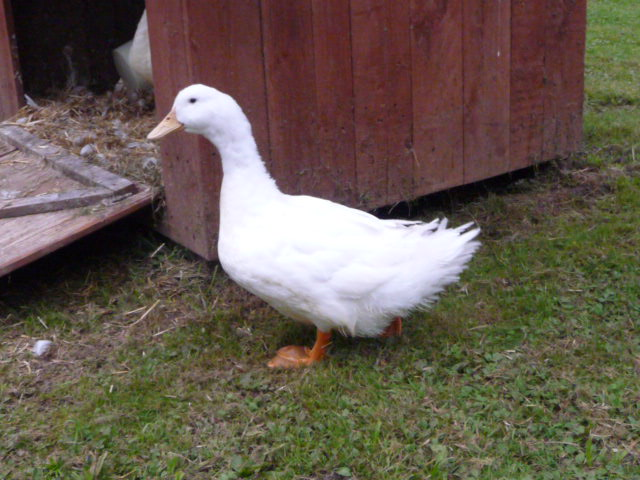
- Country of origin: France
- Distribution: Nord (Nord-Pas-de-Calais)

Classification
- duck; Anas platyrhynchos domesticus

The Canard de Bourbourg or Bourbourg duck is a French breed of domestic duck which originated from the Hauts-de-France region of France.

== History ==
The breed is named after the town of Bourbourg in the Nord department of the Hauts-de-France region of France. The breed was developed in the second half of the 19th century from the Belgian Merchtem duck and the English Aylesbury duck, and its breed standard was officially approved in 1924.

== Description ==
It is a white farm-type duck with a massive, broad, and nearly horizontal body. Its bill is pinkish-white and its shanks are orange-white As an adult, it can exceed 3 kg (6.6 lb) in weight.

The female's eggs weigh approximately 70 g (2.5 oz) and have a white shell. A female Bourbourg duck lays more than fifty eggs per year.
