= Magpie duck =

British breed of domestic duck

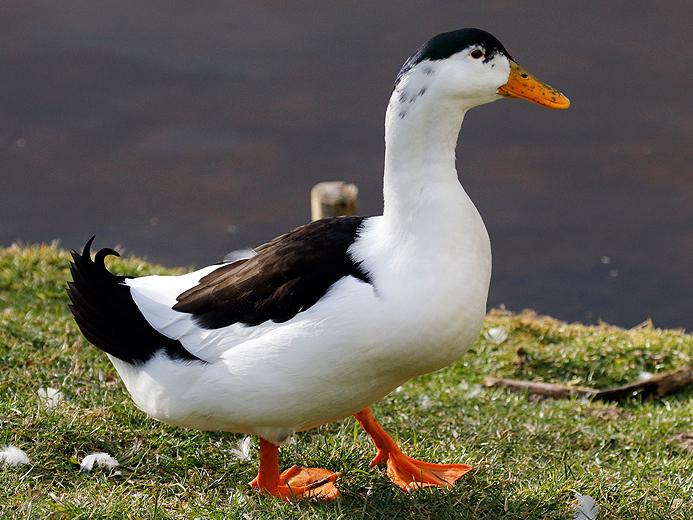
- Drake

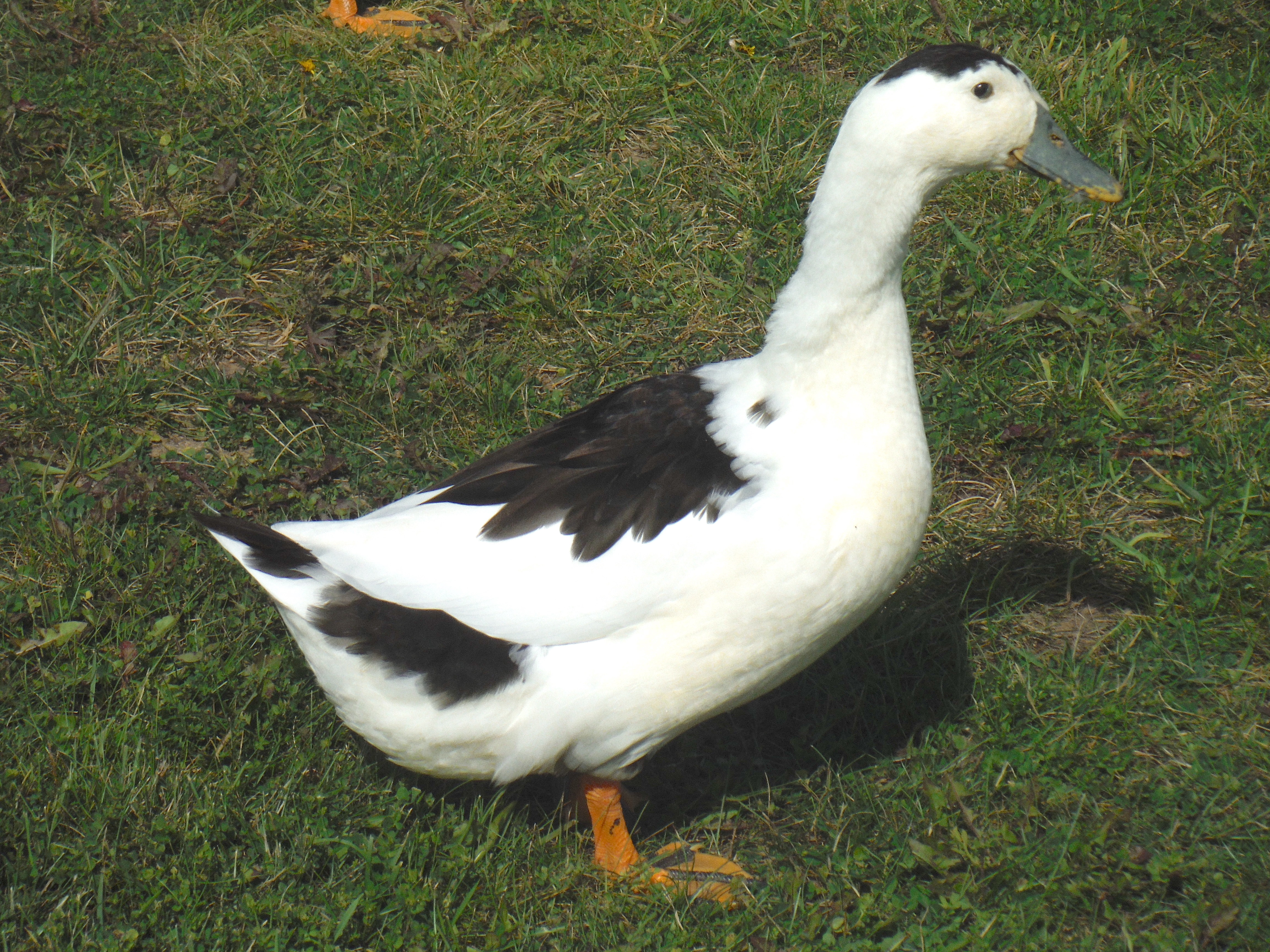
- Duck
- Conservation status: FAO (2007): critical; RBST (2021): UK breeds; DAD-IS (2022): unknown
- Country of origin: United Kingdom
- Use: meat; eggs; showing

Traits
- Weight: Male: 2.5–3.2 kg; Female: 2.0–2.7 kg
- Egg colour: variable, from white to pale green
- Colour: black-and-white; blue-and-white; buff-and-white; chocolate-and-white

Classification
- APA: light duck
- EE: yes
- PCGB: light

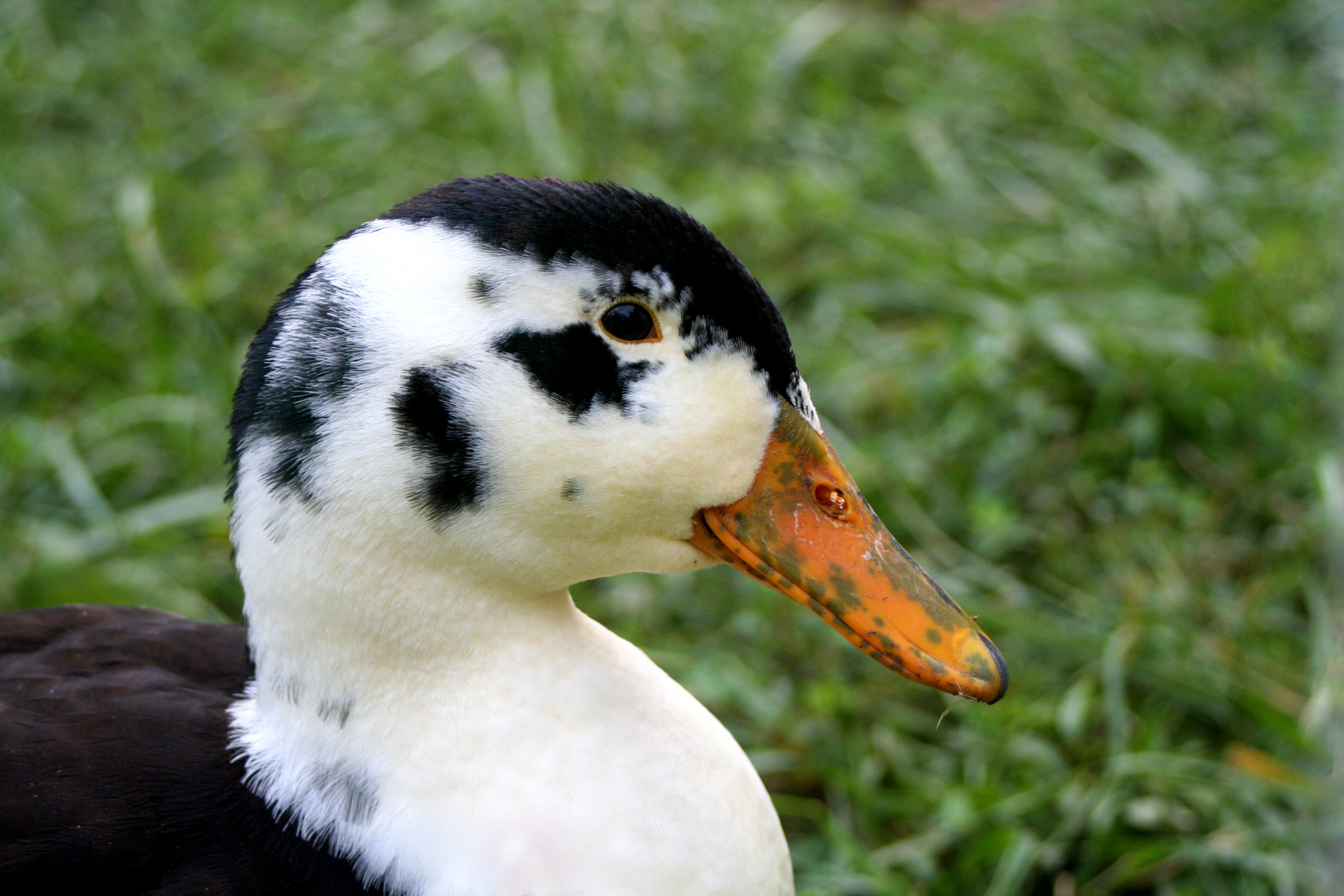
Head of a drake, showing undesirable black spotting

The Magpie is a British breed of domestic duck. It has distinctive black and white markings reminiscent of the European magpie, and is a good layer of large eggs.

== History ==
The Magpie was bred after the end of the First World War by M. C. Gower-Williams in Wales and Oliver Drake in Yorkshire. The ancestry of the breed is not known; it may have included the Indian Runner, possibly with some influence of the Huttegem of Belgium. The Magpie was first described in 1921; a breeders' club was formed in 1926, and a breed standard published in a supplement to the Poultry Club Standards in that year. At that time, two colour varieties were recognised by the club, the black-and-white and the blue-and-white. The black-and-white variant remained the only colour recognised by the Poultry Club of Great Britain until 1997, when blue-and-white and dun-and-white were recognised; the chocolate-and-white variant, developed by breeders in Germany, was later added.

The Altrheiner Elsterenten, a duck with the same plumage pattern as the Magpie, was bred in Germany in the 1970s by Paul-Erwin Oswald. The Entente Européenne treats it as the same breed.

The Magpie was exported to the United States in 1963, but was not widely kept. It was admitted to the American Standard of Perfection in 1977.

The conservation status of the Magpie is not clear: it was listed as 'critical' by the Food and Agriculture Organization of the United Nations in 2007, and as 'unknown' in the DAD-IS database in 2022. It was not among the breeds listed as 'priority' on the 2021–2022 watchlist of the Rare Breeds Survival Trust. No population data has been reported to DAD-IS since 2002, when the total number of birds was estimated to be between 60 and 100.

== Characteristics ==
The Magpie was originally bred to have black-and-white markings reminiscent of those of the magpie, Pica pica: white, with black on the top of the head, a black back and tail, and black scapulars which form a heart-shaped black area on the back when the wings are folded. With age the black may become flecked with white or wholly white. Three other colour varieties with the same pattern are recognised by the Poultry Club of Great Britain: blue-and-white, dun-and-white and chocolate-and-white.

The birds are of medium size; drakes weigh some 2.5–3.2 kg (5.5–7 lb), ducks 2.0–2.7 kg (4.5–6 lb). The body is carried at an angle of about 35° to the horizontal when the bird is in motion. The neck is long and curved, the breast full, and the back broad. The bill is broad and long; it is yellow when the bird is young, turning with age to grey-green in ducks and green-spotted yellow in drakes. The legs and feet are orange, sometimes with dark mottling.

The American Poultry Association recognises only the blue and black colour varieties, and recommends a slightly lower body weight.

== Use ==
The Magpie is commonly reared for showing. It was originally bred as a commercial or utility bird, to provide meat and eggs. As the breast is white, the carcase plucks cleanly. Ducks lay approximately 80 eggs per year; they vary in colour from white to pale green, and weigh about 65 g. The 'Paramount' strain reared by Oliver Drake in the early twentieth century reportedly laid 185 eggs per year, and reached slaughter weight in about 11 weeks.
