= Ancona (surname) =

== Surname ==
=== Ancona ===
Ancona is a surname. Notable people with the surname include:

- Eligio Ancona del Castillo (1835–1893), Mexican lawyer, author and state governor
- George Ancona (1929–2021), American photo essayist, author and illustrator of children's books
- Mario Ancona (1860–1931), Italian singer
- Ronni Ancona (born 1966), British actress and impressionist
- Solange Ancona (1943–2019), French composer
- Sydenham E. Ancona (1824–1913), Democratic member of the U.S. House of Representatives from Pennsylvania

=== D'Ancona ===
D'Ancona or d'Ancona is a surname.

- Alessandro d'Ancona (1835–1914) Italian writer and critic
- Hedy d'Ancona (born 1937) Dutch politician
- Jacob d'Ancona an Italian Jewish writer.
- Matthew d'Ancona (born 1968) English journalist
- Mirella Levi D'Ancona (1919–2014) Italian-born American art historian.
- Vito D'Ancona (1825–1884) Italian painter
- Umberto D'Ancona (1896–1964) Italian biologist.

== See also ==
- Ancona (disambiguation)
- Antona (name)
