= Golden Cascade =

Breed of duck

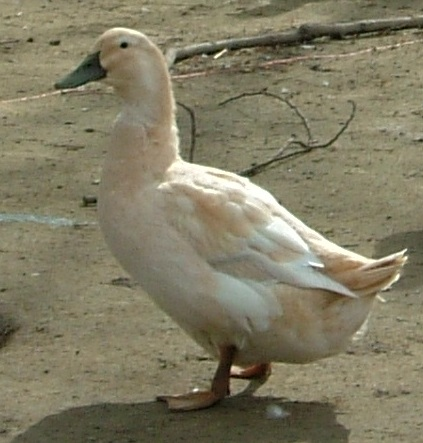
Golden Cascade female

The Golden Cascade is a breed of domestic duck developed in the United States. In 1979, David Holderread of Corvallis, Oregon set out to breed a duck that was fast growing, active, laid eggs well, and was auto-sexing. By the mid-1980s, the Golden Cascade was introduced to the market. It is not yet admitted to the American Poultry Association's Standard of Perfection.

The Golden Cascade was so named because of its golden (brown sex linked recessive) hue, and for the prominent Cascade Range of the Northwest. They weigh 6-8 pounds (2.7-3.6 kilos). Females have Fawn or buff plumage and Orange beaks with brown markings. Drakes have yellow beaks, Satin green or Bronze heads, white ring on their necks, reddish breasts and white underbodies. The throat can turn light fawn. Older drakes can molt to a fawn or buff that covers the head and body but First year birds should have a chestnut chest with the classic golden buff to white shoulders, sides and belly. The ducklings can be bred to be auto-sexing as they carry the brown sex linked gene.

== See also ==
- List of duck breeds
