= Australian Spotted =

Breed of domesticated ducks

The name Australian Spotted is something of a misnomer, as the Australian Spotted duck is one of the few breeds of domesticated ducks that originated in the United States. John C. Kriner and Stanley Mason of Pennsylvania developed this breed by allowing Calls, mallards, pintails, and various Australian wild ducks to crossbreed for several years before selecting the desired specimens. The first exhibit of the Australian Spotted began in 1928.

== Pintails ==
Many duck enthusiasts don't believe that pintails contributed to the acculturation, because a mallard derivative and pintail cross renders a sterile duck due to chromosomal differences. However, it is possible for a rare mutant mallard-pintail cross to pass on its genes to generations to come, leaving it possible that the pintail did indeed contribute to the specimens. David Holderread, one of the top waterfowl breeders in the United States, has said that he has observed various traits in the Australian Spotted that are distinct to pintails.

== Types ==
There are three different color varieties of the Australian spotted: green heads, blue heads and silver heads.

== See also ==
- List of duck breeds
