= Shetland duck =

British breed of duck

Shetland
- Conservation status: FAO (2007): critical; DAD-IS (2020): unknown
- Country of origin: United Kingdom
- Distribution: Scotland
- Use: eggs
- Egg colour: white/grey

Classification
- EE: no
- PCGB: no
- Duck; Anas platyrhynchos

The Shetland is a British breed of domestic duck originating in the Shetland Islands of northern Scotland. It is critically endangered. It is not recognised by the Poultry Club of Great Britain or by the Entente Européenne, but falls under the British Waterfowl Association. It is one of the sixteen native British duck breeds whose conservation status was listed as "priority" by the Rare Breeds Survival Trust in 2025–2026, and one of three Shetland breeds identified as of concern on that list.

== History ==
The Shetland is a traditional breed of the Shetland Islands of northern Scotland. In 2002 the total number of the ducks was estimated at 60–100 birds. No population data has been reported since then to DAD-IS, where in 2025 its conservation status was listed as "unknown". Like all native British duck breeds, it was listed as "priority" on the 2025–2026 watchlist of the Rare Breeds Survival Trust.

== Characteristics ==
The Shetland is a small, hardy breed; it is active and forages well. It is similar in appearance to the black (undiluted) variant of the Swedish Blue, with black plumage where the Blue Swedish has blue; the black plumage has glossy green and blue lights in it. The birds usually have a white bib, and may have some white on the head; they may become paler as they age, in some cases turning almost entirely white. The bill and legs are black in the duck: in the drake, the legs may carry some orange, and the bill may be tinged with yellow.

== Use ==
The Shetland is a good layer; the eggs are of a good size and range in colour from white to grey.
