= Challandais =

French breed of duck

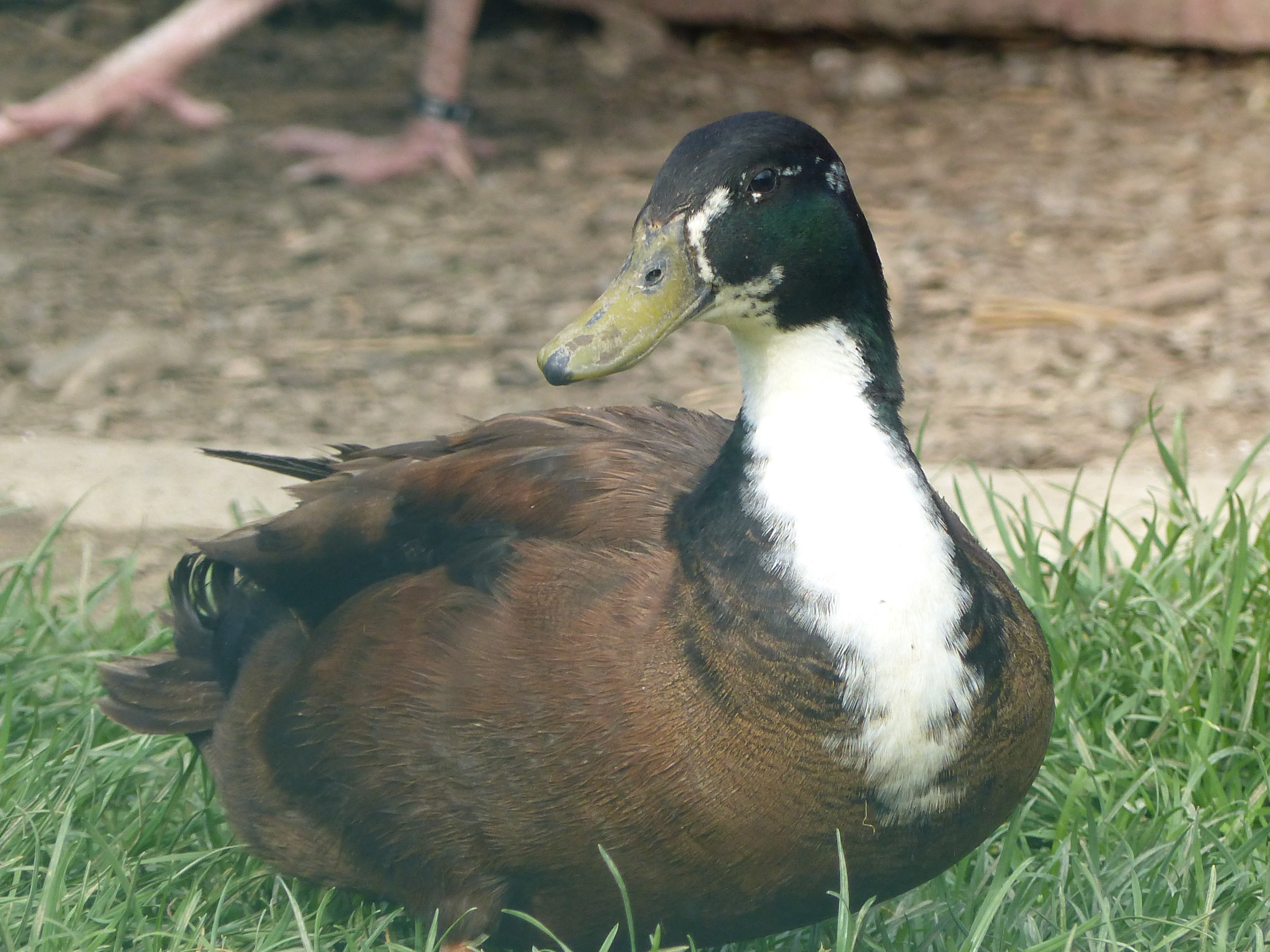
- In the Écomusée de la Bintinais, in Rennes
- Conservation status: FAO (2007): endangered; DAD-IS (2026): unknown
- Country of origin: France
- Distribution: Marais Breton, Pays de la Loire

Classification
- APA: no
- EE: listed, not recognised
- PCGB: no
- duck; Anas platyrhynchos

The Challandais or Canard de Challans is a French breed of domestic duck. It originates in, and was formerly widely distributed in, the Marais Breton, the marshlands of southern Brittany and northern Poitou, in the Pays de la Loire region of western France. The breed name derives from that of the commune of Challans in the département of the Vendée; it is also associated with the city of Nantes, some 60 km to the north, and so may also be known as the Nantais.

In the twenty-first century it is an endangered breed. It is recognised by the Fédération Française des Volailles.
