= Swedish Blue =

Swedish breed of duck

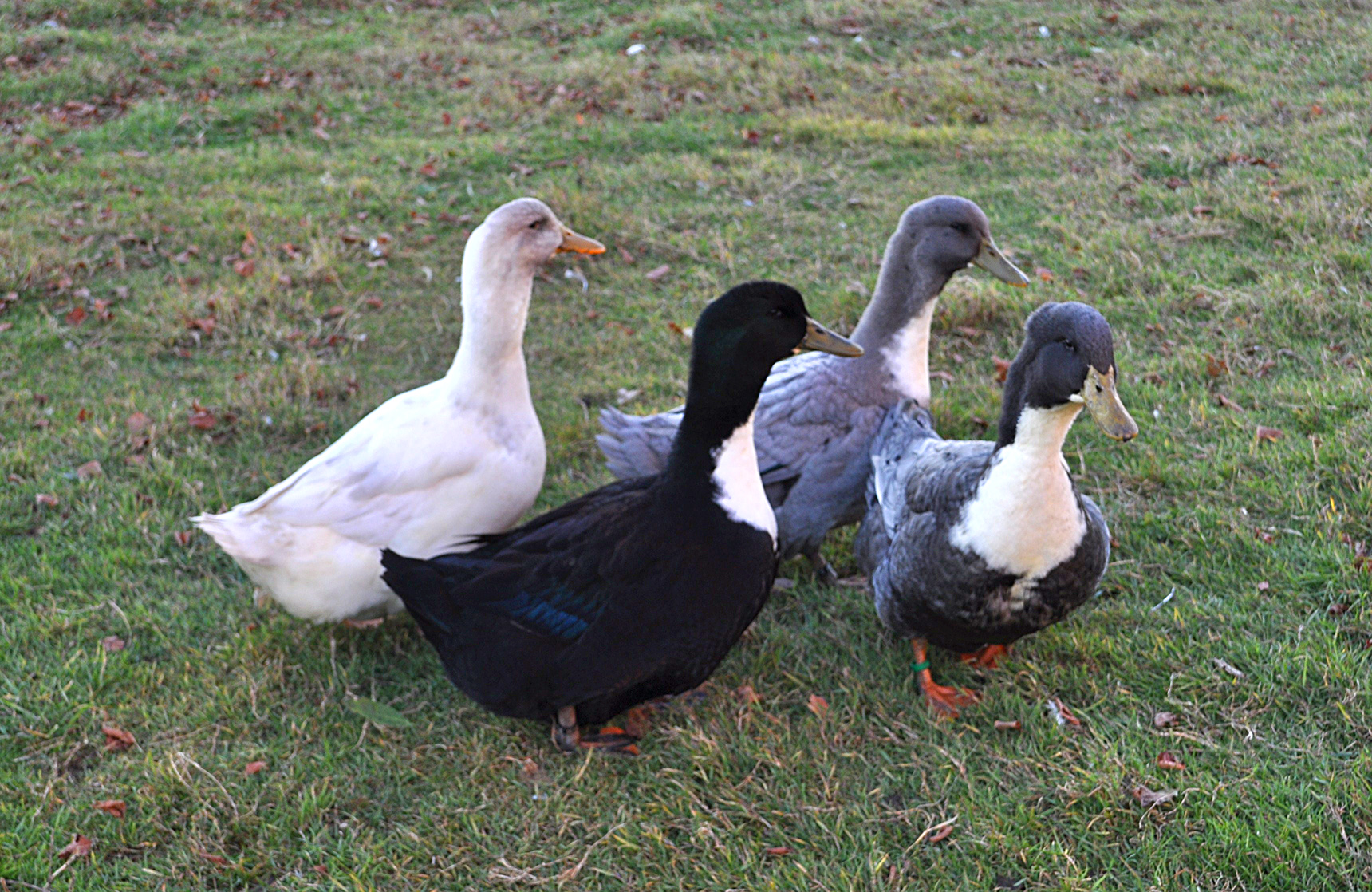
- The three colours – two blue birds on the right, black and pale blue-white examples to the left
- Conservation status: FAO (2007): critical; DAD-IS (2023): at risk/endangered
- Other names: Swedish: Svensk blå anka; Blue Swedish; Swedish
- Country of origin: Sweden (Swedish Pomerania)

Traits
- Weight: Male: 3–4 kg; Female: 2.5–3.5 kg

Classification
- APA: medium duck
- EE: yes
- PCGB: heavy
- Duck; Anas platyrhynchos domesticus

The Swedish Blue (Swedish: Svensk blå anka) or Blue Swedish is a Swedish breed of domestic duck. It originated in the former dominion of Swedish Pomerania – now in north-west Poland and north-east Germany – and is documented there from 1835. It is closely similar to the Pomeranian Duck from the same general area, differing mainly in its white primary feathers.

== History ==
The Swedish Blue originated in the former dominion of Swedish Pomerania, now in north-west Poland and north-east Germany; the first documented mention of it there is from 1835. Some birds were exported to the United States in 1884, and the blue variety was added to the Standard of Perfection of the American Poultry Association in 1904 as the "Swedish".

The world-wide conservation status of the Swedish Blue was listed as "critical" by the Food and Agriculture Organization of the United Nations in 2007; in 2023 it was listed as "at risk/endangered" in Sweden, where the total population reported to DAD-IS for 2021 was 282. No population data is listed for Ireland, the only other country reporting the breed. In 2023 it was listed as "watch" by the American Livestock Conservancy of the United States, which does not report it to the FAO database.

== Characteristics ==
The Swedish Blue is a medium-sized bird: drakes weigh some 3–4 kg, ducks about 2.5–3.5 kg. It is rather shorter and broader in body shape than breeds such as the Cayuga or Orpington; the body is rounded, plump and full-breasted, the back is straight and fairly flat, and is about half as long again as it is broad. The body is carried at an angle of about 20° to the horizontal. The head is long, oval and finely made.

There are three colour varieties, of which only one – the blue – is recognised in the standards; their distribution is determined by the zygosity of a single dilution gene. As in other blue poultry such as the Blue Andalusian breed of chicken, if two blue birds are bred, the young are, in the expected Mendelian proportion:

- 25%: a homozygous form, black where the blue should be
- 50%: heterozygous, the typical blue
- 25%: the other homozygous form, pale blue-white or silver.

If the black and pale forms are bred together, the offspring are all heterozygous and thus all blue. Blue-coloured ducks (females) may become progressively paler as they age; while they are then no longer suitable for showing, they can be used for breeding.

The Swedish Blue is distinguished from the Pomeranian Duck, another blue duck from approximately the same region, by its white primaries.

== Use ==
As a utility breed, the Swedish Blue forages well, is fairly fast-growing, and produces meat of good quality; ducks lay about 100–150 white or tinted (blue or green) eggs per year, of some 80–90 g in weight.

It may be reared as a show bird, but the difficulty of meeting the requirements of the breed standard means that it must be kept in large numbers, which may discourage prospective breeders.
