= Swedish Yellow =

Breed of domestic duck

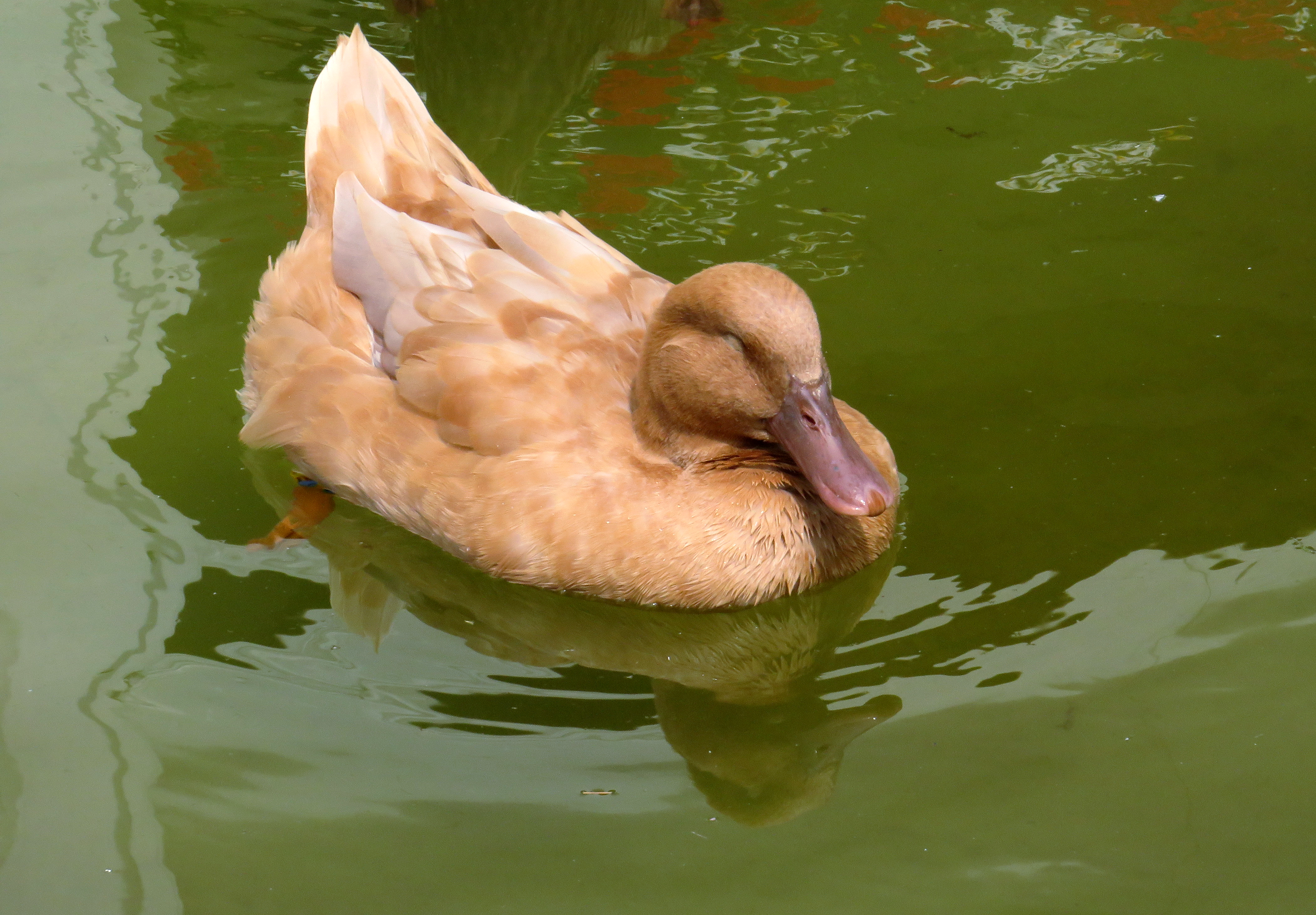
- A swimming Swedish Yellow
- Conservation status: Critical-maintained (FAO, 2007)
- Country of origin: Scania, Sweden
- Distribution: Sweden

Traits
- Weight: Male: 3–3.5kg; Female: 2.5-3kg
- Egg colour: White
- Colour: Yellow

Classification
- Duck; Anas platyrhynchos domesticus

The Swedish Yellow duck (Swedish: Svensk gul anka) or just Swedish Yellow is a medium-sized Swedish breed of domestic duck only verified to exist in their homeland.

== History ==
Developed in the 20th century in the county of Skåne by Måns Eriksson, the duck is speculated to be a mix of Swedish Blue, Khaki Campbell and some other local breed of white duck. In the 1930s the duck was very common on farms in rural Sweden, but by the 1950s it had earned its status of a fairly rare duck and by the 1970s the duck was thought to be extinct, but turned out not to be.

== Description ==
The duck, as the name implies, is yellow in colour. The drakes weigh 3–3.5kg while the ducks weigh 2.5–3kg.

== Conservation ==
As of 2007, the FAO marked the duck as "Critical-maintained", meaning it is critically endangered but maintained and at very little risk of any loss. In 2021 DAD-IS reported it as "at risk" with 6 herds with an average of 37 individuals each making up a total population of 236.
