= Cayuga duck =

American breed of domestic duck

Cayuga Duck
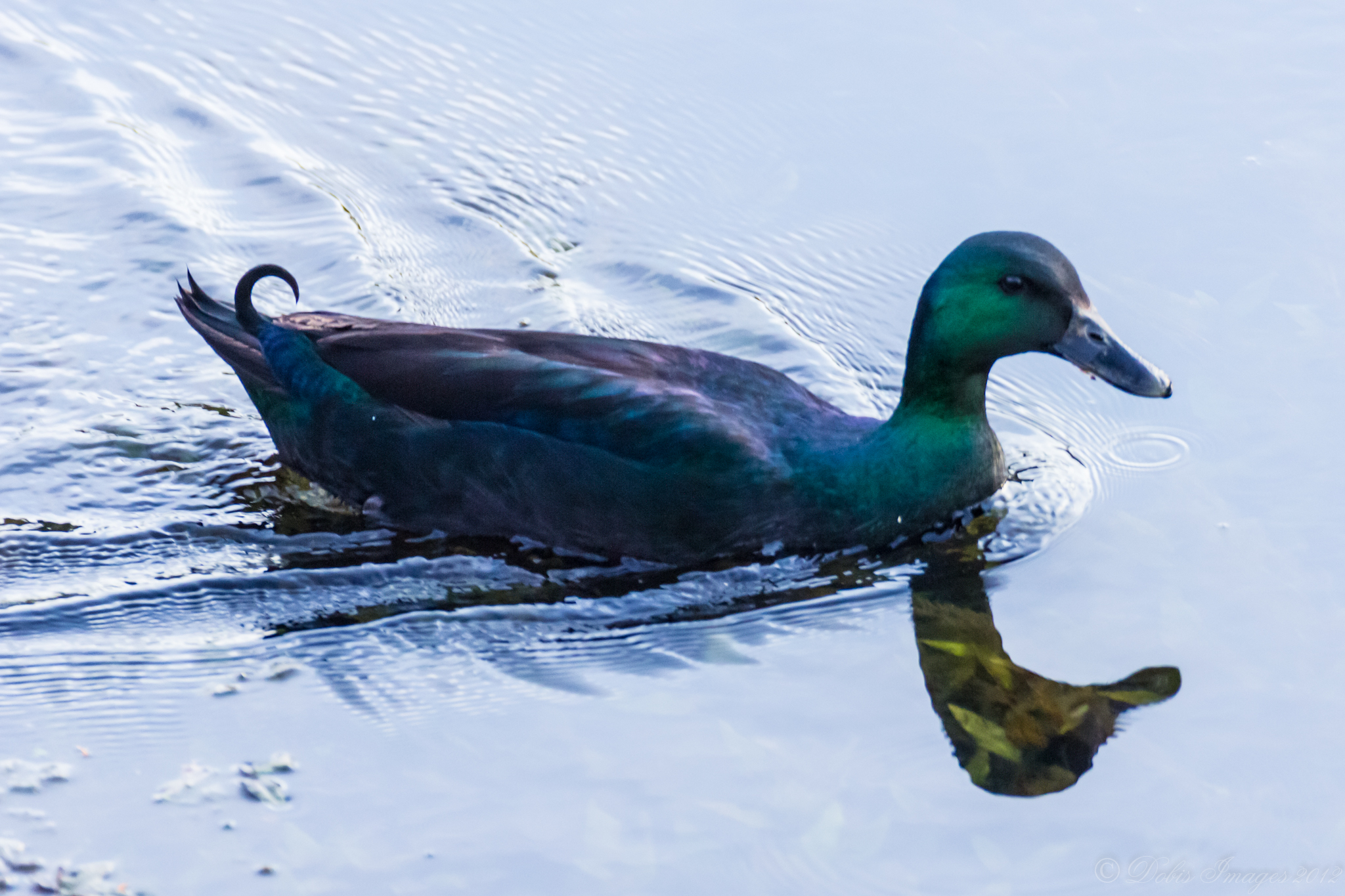
- A drake

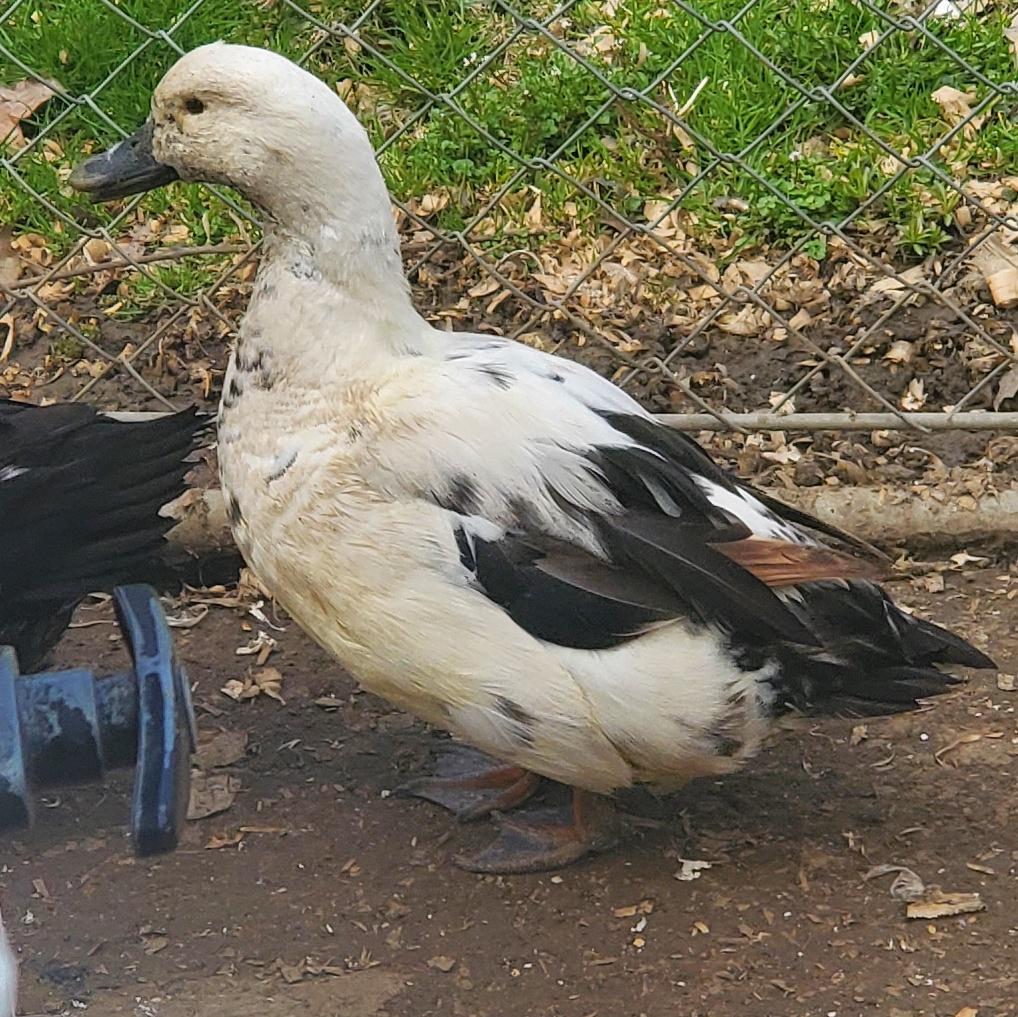
- An elderly duck
- Conservation status: FAO (2007): not at risk; ALBC (2008): threatened; TLC (2025): watch
- Other names: Cayuga Black Duck
- Country of origin: United States
- Use: eggs; meat; ornament; fishing flies

Traits
- Weight: Male: 3.0–3.6 kg (6.5–8 lb); Female: 2.7–3.1 kg (6–7 lb)
- Egg color: variable, black to pale green/blue

Classification
- APA: medium
- EE: yes
- PCGB: heavy
- Anas platyrhynchos domesticus

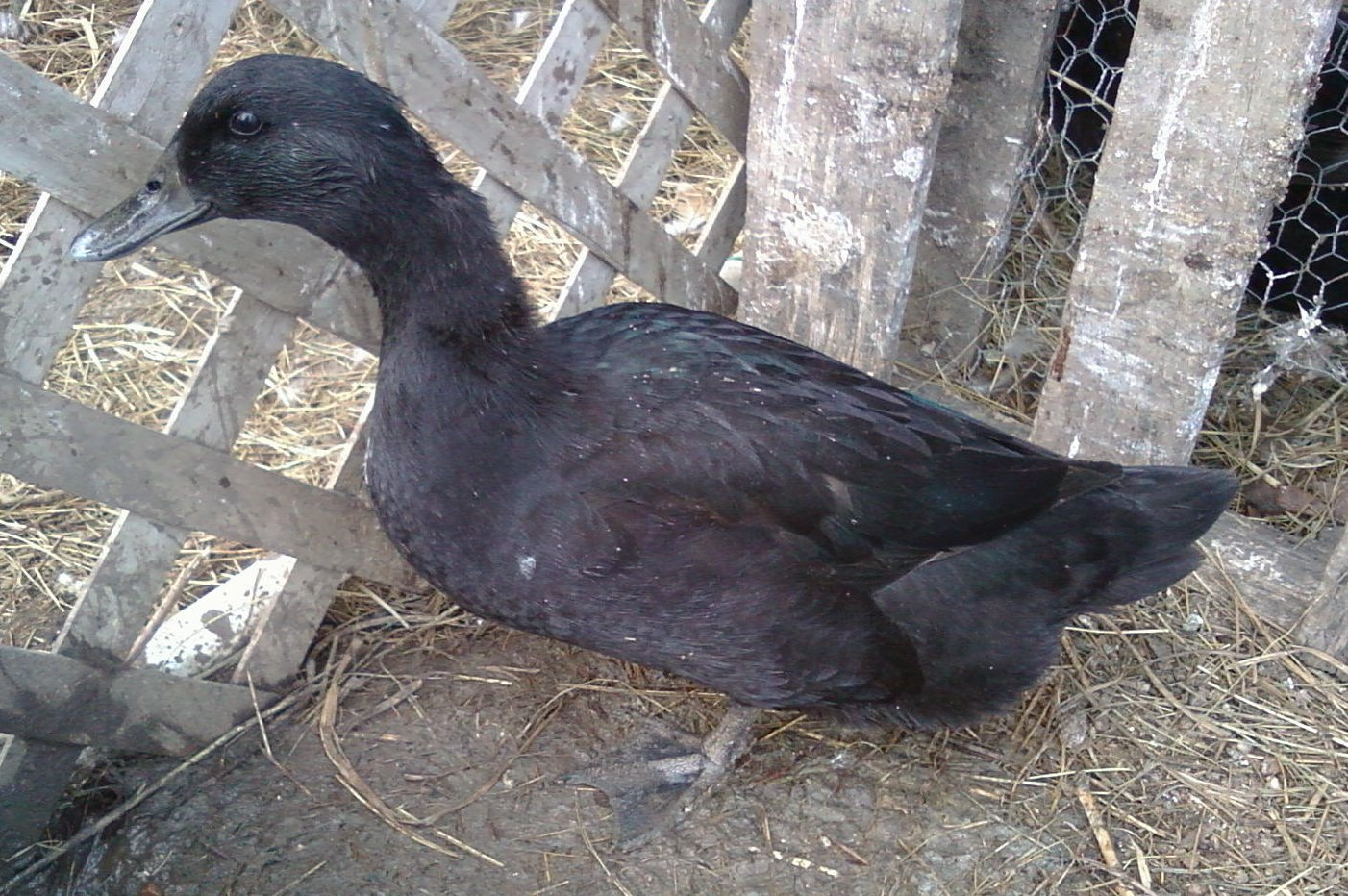
Duck

The Cayuga is an American breed of domestic duck. It was introduced to the Finger Lakes region of New York around 1840, and is named for the Cayuga people of that area. Until the last years of the 19th century, it was the principal duck reared for meat in the United States. In the 21st century, it is kept mainly for ornament. Its plumage is black with iridescent, beetle-green lights.

== History ==
The origins of the Cayuga are obscure. A much-repeated theory that it descends not from the mallard like almost all domestic ducks, but from Anas rubripes, the American black duck, remains unsubstantiated and unverified by any scientific evidence. Unlike A. rubripes, the Cayuga is a true black in color, the result of a genetic mutation fairly common in breeds derived from A. platyrhynchos. The Cayuga has other characteristics compatible with derivation from the mallard; in particular, it shows the typical curled "drake feather" in the tail, while A. rubripes does not.

Around 1840, one John S. Clark obtained some ducks of this type in Orange County, New York, and took them to Cayuga County in the Finger Lakes region of New York. The breed is named for the indigenous Cayuga people of the area.

The Cayuga was included in the first edition of the American Standard of Perfection in 1874. It was first exported to the United Kingdom in 1851; the first British standard was published in 1901.

Its conservation status world-wide was listed by the Food and Agriculture Organization of the United Nations in 2007 as "not at risk". In 2008, its status in the United States was listed as "threatened" by the American Livestock Breeds Conservancy (now the Livestock Conservancy); in 2025. it was listed as "watch".

== Characteristics ==
The Cayuga is a medium to heavy duck; standard weights are 3.6 kg (8 lb) for adult drakes and 3.2 kg (7 lb) for ducks. Its plumage is black with iridescent, beetle-green lights; particularly in ducks, some feathers may fade or whiten as the bird ages, which can be a disqualifying fault for showing. The bill, legs, and feet are black or as nearly so as possible; the eyes are dark brown.

== Use ==
The Cayuga is a meat-type duck. In the second half of the 19th century it became the principal duck breed reared for meat in the United States. From about 1890 it began to be displaced by the American Pekin, which did not have the black pinfeathers of the Cayuga and so was easier to pluck and clean for sale.

In the 21st century, it may be reared for meat and eggs, but is most often kept for ornament or for showing. Ducks may lay some 100–150 large eggs per year. At the beginning of the laying season, the eggs are dark and may be almost black; they gradually lighten to the usual pale greenish blue or almost to white by the end of the season. If they are to be hatched, the incubation time for the eggs is 28 days.

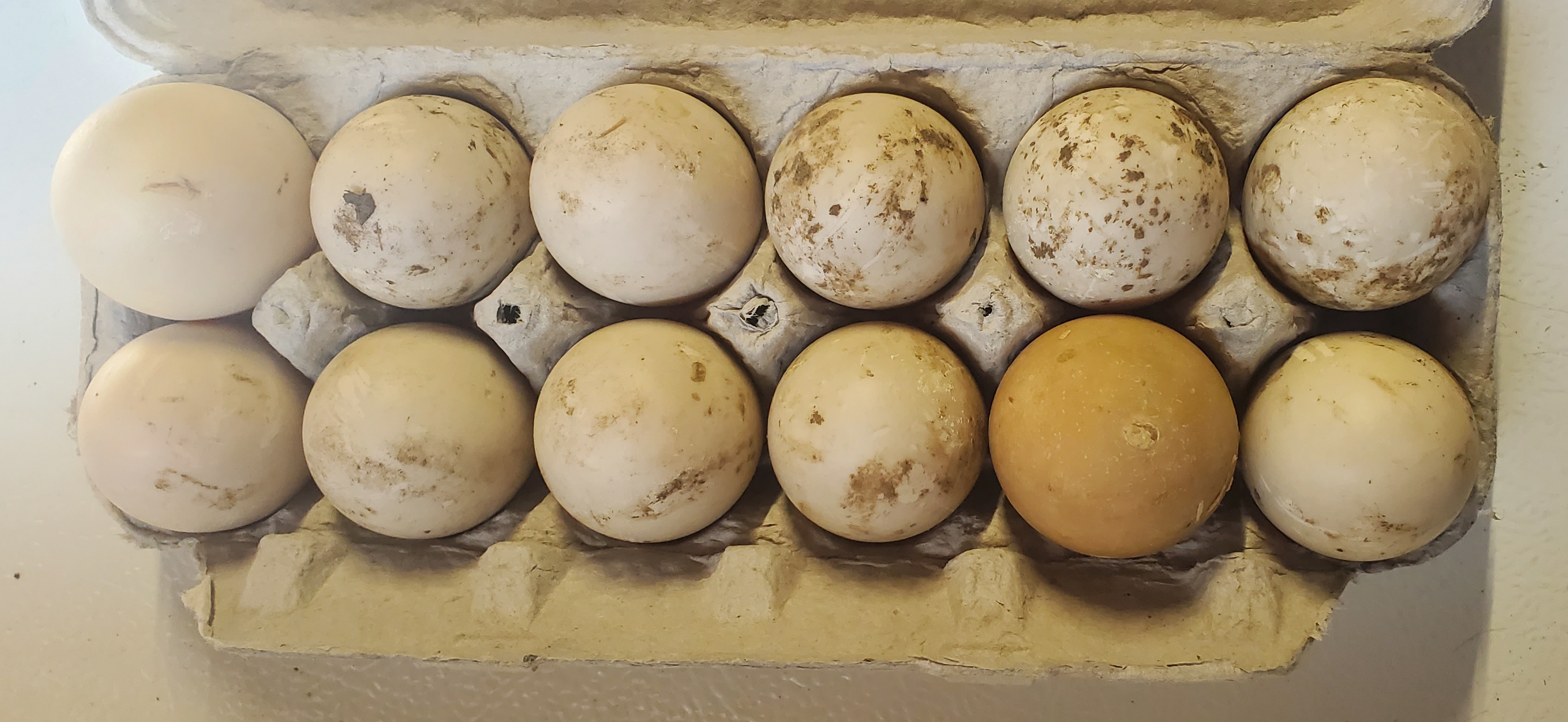
Cayuga duck eggs with mud splotches and shavings: The duck's waxy bloom is very noticeable, with parts of it being much thinner on other part of the egg. They are bigger than a normal extra large egg.

The feathers may be used in the tying of fishing flies.
