= Forest duck =

Breed of domestic duck

- Conservation status: Critical (FAO, 2007)
- Country of origin: Belgium

Traits
- Weight: 3kg
- Color: white or black

Classification

Notes
- Created by Herman Bertrand
- Duck; Anas bertrandi Anas platyrhynchos domesticus

The Forest duck is a Belgian breed of domestic duck originating in the commune of Forest sometime in 1890.

== History ==
Created in Forest by Herman Bertrand, the duck was created to have good egg and meat quality. When the duck came to be Bertrand decided to give it the Latin name Anas bertrandi after his own name. The duck was called by its Latin name until some time after when it was commonly referred to as the "Forest duck" after the community of Forest in which the duck was created and Bertrand lived in. After Bertrand saw the breed as complete in 1905 he launched it with 30 blue individuals at an international exhibition. These 30 ducks were blue in colour similar to Blue Andalusians.

In 1924 the breed club which Bertrand was a part of decided to send 24 high quality Forest ducks to a show at Crystal Palace. After this show the duck gained popularity and demand, especially by the city council of Saint Petersburg which wanted to import 350 hatching eggs.

The duck nearly saw its demise during the first and second world wars in which the farmers who owned the ducks would end up slaughtering many individuals for their meat. After the second world war the duck was presumed to be extinct until a group of breeders ultimately brought its breed back to life sometime in the 1960s.

== Conservation ==
As of 2007, the duck was classified as "critical" by the FAO, meaning it is critically endangered.
