= Entente Européenne d'Aviculture et de Cuniculture =

European organisation of animal breeders

- Abbreviation: EE
- Formation: 18 June 1938
- Type: International association
- Purpose: Association for breeders of poultry, pigeons, cage birds, rabbits and guinea-pigs
- Headquarters: Berchem, Luxembourg
- Region served: Europe
- Members: 2.5 million
- Website: entente-ee.com
- Formerly called: Entente des Commissions Internationales

The Entente Européenne d'Aviculture et de Cuniculture (French pronunciation: [ɑ̃tɑ̃t øʁɔpeɛn davikyltyʁ e də kynikyltyʁ]), usually known as the Entente Européenne or simply EE, is a European organisation of breeders of poultry, pigeons, rabbits, guinea-pigs and cage-birds. It was founded in Brussels on 18 June 1938 as the Entente des Commissions Internationales; the founding members were from Belgium, France, Luxembourg and the Netherlands. It is now based in Luxembourg. It represents some 2.5 million members from 31 countries. It sometimes uses an alternative name:

- French: Association Européenne pour l'Elevage de Volailles, de Pigeons, d'Oiseaux, de Lapins et de Cobayes
- German: Europäischer Verband für Geflügel-, Tauben-, Vogel-, Kaninchen- und Caviazucht
- European Association of Poultry, Pigeon, Cage Bird, Rabbit and Cavy Breeders.
