= List of breeds in the British Poultry Standards =

The breeds of poultry in the British Poultry Standards of the Poultry Club of Great Britain include chickens, ducks, geese and turkeys.

== Chickens ==
Breed	Classification	Notes	Image
Ancona	soft feather: light		
Andalusian	rare soft feather: light		
Appenzeller Spitzhauben	rare soft feather: light	treated as variants of a single breed	
Appenzeller Barthuhn	rare soft feather: light	treated as variants of a single breed	
Araucana	soft feather: light		
Asil	Asian hard feather		
Augsburger	rare soft feather: light		
Australorp	soft feather: heavy		
Barnevelder	soft feather: heavy		
Belgian bantam	true bantam		
Belgian Game	rare hard feather		
Bergischer Kräher	rare long crowers		
Booted Bantam	rare true bantam		
Brabanter	rare soft feather: light		
Brahma	soft feather: heavy		
Brakel	rare soft feather: light		
Buckeye	rare soft feather: heavy		
Campine	rare soft feather: light		
Carlisle Old English Game	hard feather		
Cochin	soft feather: heavy		
Cream Legbar	rare soft feather: light		
Crèvecoeur	rare soft feather: heavy		
Croad Langshan	soft feather: heavy		
Danderawi	rare soft feather: light		
Denizli	rare long crowers		
Derbyshire Redcap	soft feather: light		
Dominique	rare soft feather: heavy		
Dorking	soft feather: heavy		
Dutch Bantam	true bantam		
Faverolles	soft feather: heavy		
Fayoumi	rare soft feather: light		
Friesian	rare soft feather: light		
Frizzle	soft feather: heavy		
German Langshan	soft feather: heavy		
Hamburgh	soft feather: light		
Houdan	rare soft feather: heavy		
Indian Game	hard feather		
Italiener	rare soft feather: light		
Ixworth	rare soft feather: heavy		
Japanese Bantam	true bantam		
Jersey Giant	rare soft feather: heavy		
Jurlower	rare long crowers		
Ko Shamo	Asian hard feather		
Koeyoshi	rare long crowers		
Kraienköppe	rare soft feather: light		
Kulang	Asian hard feather		
Kurokashiwa	rare long crowers		
La Bresse	rare soft feather: light		
La Flèche	rare soft feather: heavy		
Lakenvelder	rare soft feather: light		
Legbar	rare soft feather: light		
Leghorn	soft feather: light		
Malay	Asian hard feather		
Malines	rare soft feather: heavy		
Marans	soft feather: heavy		
Marsh Daisy	rare soft feather: light		
Minorca	soft feather: light		
Modern Game	hard feather		
Modern Langshan	rare soft feather: heavy		
Nankin	rare true bantam		
Nankin Shamo	Asian hard feather		
Neiderrheiner	rare soft feather: heavy		
Netherlands Owlbeard	rare soft feather: light		
New Hampshire Red	soft feather: heavy		
Norfolk Grey	rare soft feather: heavy		
North Holland Blue	rare soft feather: heavy		
Ohiki	rare true bantam		
Old English Game Bantam	hard feather		
Old English Pheasant Fowl	rare soft feather: light		
Orloff	rare soft feather: heavy		
Orpington	soft feather: heavy		
Oxford Old English Game	hard feather		
Pekin	true bantam		
Penedesenca	rare soft feather: heavy		
Plymouth Rock	soft feather: heavy		
Poland	soft feather: light		
Rhode Island Red	soft feather: heavy		
Rhodebar	rare soft feather: heavy		
Rosecomb	true bantam		
Rumpless Araucana	soft feather: light		
Rumpless Game	rare hard feather		
Satsumadori	Asian hard feather		
Scots Dumpy	soft feather: light		
Scots Grey	soft feather: light		
Sebright	true bantam		
Serama	true bantam		
Shamo	Asian hard feather		
Sicilian Buttercup	rare soft feather: light		
Silkie	soft feather: light		
Spanish	rare soft feather: light		
Sulmtaler	rare soft feather: heavy		
Sultan	rare soft feather: light		
Sumatra	rare soft feather: light		
Sussex	soft feather: heavy		
Taiwan	Asian hard feather		
Thai Game	Asian hard feather		
Thüringian	rare soft feather: light		
Tomaru	rare long crowers		
Tôtenko	rare long crowers		
Transylvanian Naked Neck	rare soft feather: heavy		
Tuzo	Asian hard feather		
Vorwerk	rare soft feather: light		
Welbar	rare soft feather: light		
Welsummer	soft feather: light		
Wyandotte	soft feather: heavy		
Wybar	rare soft feather: heavy		
Yakaido	Asian hard feather		
Yamato-Gunkei	Asian hard feather		
Yokohama	rare soft feather: light		

== Ducks ==
Breed	Classification	Notes	Image
Abacot Ranger	light		
Aylesbury Duck	heavy		
Bali Duck	light		
Black East Indian Duck	bantam and call ducks		
Blue Swedish	heavy		
Buff Orpington Duck	light		
Call Duck	bantam and call ducks		
Campbell Duck	light		
Cayuga Duck	heavy		
Crested Duck	light		
Hook Bill Duck	light		
Indian Runner	light		
Magpie Duck	light		
Muscovy Duck	heavy		
German Pekin Duck	heavy		
Rouen Clair	heavy		
Rouen Duck	heavy		
Saxony Duck	heavy		
Silver Appleyard duck	heavy		
Silver Appleyard Miniature Duck	bantam and call ducks		
Silver Bantam	bantam and call ducks		
Welsh Harlequin Duck	light		

== Geese ==
Breed	Classification	Notes	Image
African Goose	heavy		
American Buff Goose	heavy		
Brecon Buff Goose	medium		
Buff Back Goose	medium		
Chinese Goose	light		
Czech Goose	light		
Embden Goose	heavy		
Grey Back Goose	medium		
Pilgrim Goose	light		
Pomeranian Goose	medium		
Roman Goose	light		
Sebastopol Goose	light		
Shetland Goose	light		
Skåne Goose	heavy		
Steinbacher	light		
Toulouse Goose	heavy		
West of England Goose	heavy		

== Turkeys ==
Breed	Classification	Notes	Image
Blue or Lavender Turkey	light		
Bourbon Red Turkey	heavy		
Bronze Turkey	heavy		
Buff Turkey	light		
Narragansett Turkey	heavy		
Nebraskan Spotted Turkey	heavy		
Norfolk Black Turkey	light		
Pied or Cröllwitzer Turkey	light		
Slate Turkey	light		
White Turkey	light		
