= Silver Appleyard Miniature =

British breed of duck

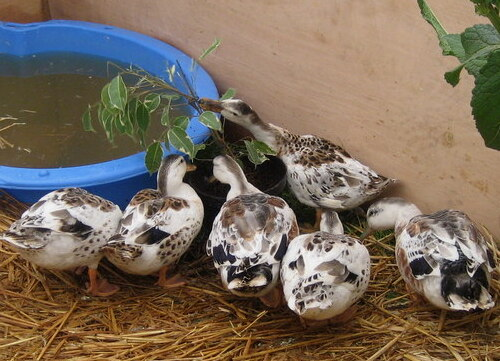
- Conservation status: FAO (2007): endangered
- Other names: Appleyard Bantam; Miniature Silver Appleyard
- Country of origin: United Kingdom
- Use: dual-purpose

Traits
- Weight: Male: 1.4 kg; Female: 1.2 kg

Classification
- APA: no
- EE: listed, not recognised
- PCGB: bantam and Call ducks

The Silver Appleyard Miniature is a British breed of duck. It was bred in the 1980s and was recognised by the Poultry Club of Great Britain as a separate breed in 1997. Like the majority of breeds of domestic duck, it derives from the wild species Anas platyrhynchos.

It may also be known as the Appleyard Bantam or Miniature Silver Appleyard. It is a distinct and separate breed from the Silver Appleyard Bantam bred by Reginald Appleyard in the 1940s and later renamed the Silver Bantam.

== History ==
The Silver Appleyard Miniature was bred from the Silver Appleyard in the 1980s, principally by Tom Bartlett of Folly Farm. It was first shown at the inaugural Championship Waterfowl Exhibition held by the British Waterfowl Association in 1987 and was recognised by the Poultry Club of Great Britain as a separate breed in 1997. It is about a third of the size of the large bird, and so is not small enough to be termed a bantam.

Reginald Appleyard bred a Silver Appleyard Bantam in the 1940s by cross-breeding Khaki Campbell ducks and Call drakes; this did not have the same genetic origin as the large bird – it resembles the Abacot Ranger much more than it does the Silver Appleyard – and was renamed the Silver Bantam when Bartlett's Miniature was recognised..

== Characteristics ==
The Silver Appleyard Miniature differs from the large Silver Appleyard in size only, and closely resembles it in shape and colour. It is thus a compact duck, with a broad and rounded body carried at some 20° to the horizontal. The bill is broad and of medium length; it is yellow with a dark bean, somewhat more greenish in the drake than in the duck. The legs are yellow, the eyes hazel. The plumage is closely similar to that of the Rouen Clair, but with pigmentation of the head and body reduced by the action of the restricted mallard gene.

Average body weights are about 1.2 kg for ducks and 1.4 kg for drakes.
