= Appenzell (disambiguation) =

Appenzell is a former Swiss canton.

Appenzell or Appenzeller may also refer to:

== Places in Switzerland ==
- Appenzell (village), a village in Switzerland and the capital of Appenzell Innerrhoden
- Appenzell Ausserrhoden (Appenzell Outer-Rhodes), a canton
- Appenzell Innerrhoden (Appenzell Inner-Rhodes), a canton
- Appenzell District, the district and municipality of Appenzell
- Appenzellerland, the geographical and cultural territory covered by Appenzell Ausserrhoden and Appenzell Innerrhoden

== Animals ==
- Appenzeller Barthuhn, a breed of chicken
- Appenzeller Spitzhauben, a breed of chicken
- Appenzell goat, a breed of goat
- Appenzeller Sennenhund, a breed of dog

== Other ==
- the people of Appenzell
- Appenzeller (cheese)
- Appenzell Creek, a tributary of McMichael Creek in Pennsylvania, U.S.
- "Appenzeller", a yodeling standard; see Appenzeller string music
- Benedictus Appenzeller, composer of the Renaissance
