= Crossed beak =

Congenital deformity in birds

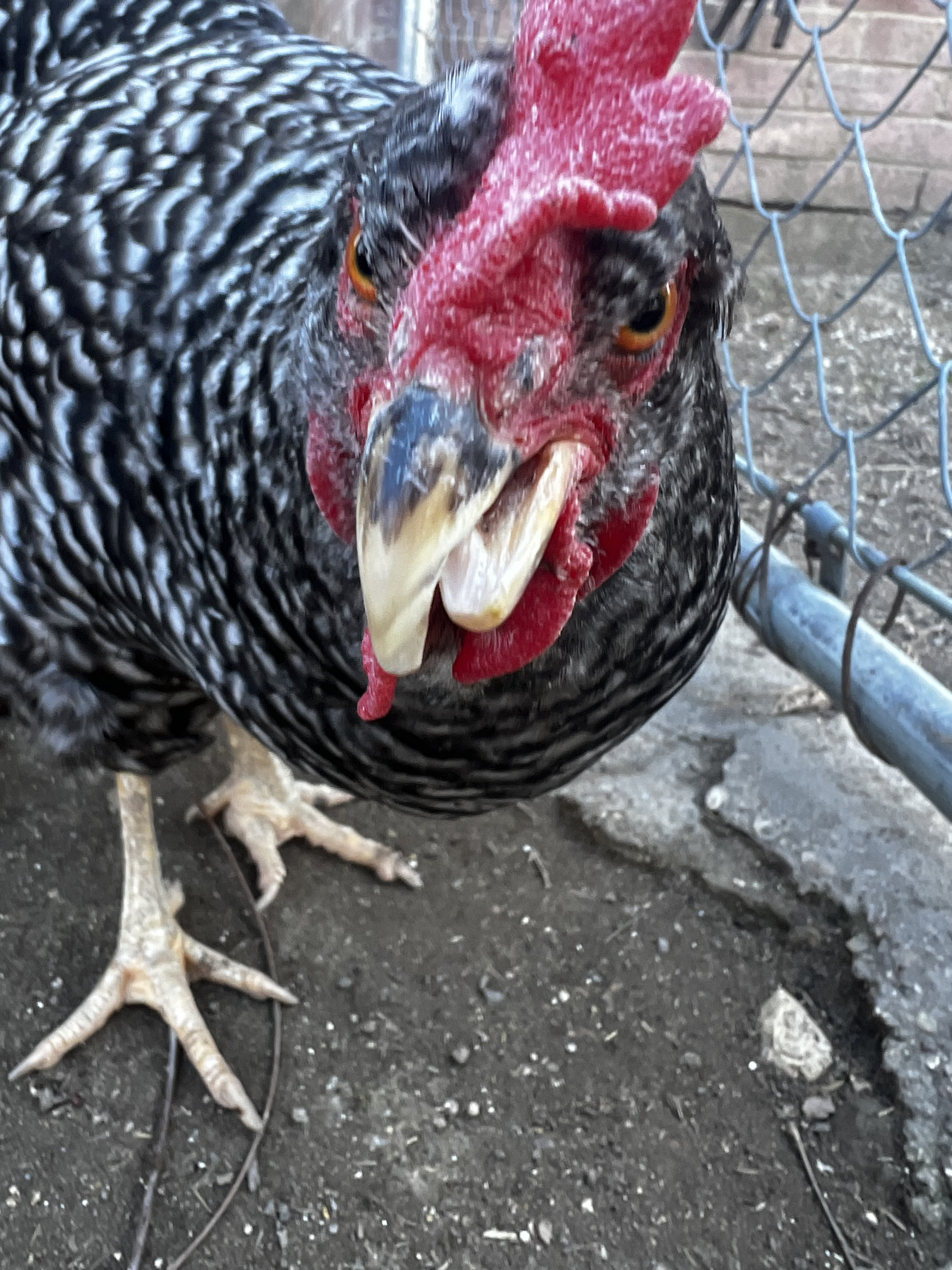
A Plymouth Rock hen with a crossed beak

Crossed beak, also known as cross beak and scissor beak, is a congenital deformity in birds, particularly poultry, where the upper and lower parts of the beak do not align properly. This condition results in the beak crossing or growing in a way that prevents the bird from closing its beak properly. As a result, affected birds may have difficulty eating and performing other essential activities.

== Identification ==
Crossed beak is a deformity characterized by a misalignment of the upper and lower beak, with one or both beaks exhibiting lateral deviation from the head's longitudinal axis.

The upper beak frequently exhibits horizontal bending at its base, alongside the affected mandible, and the skull, particularly the nasals and orbits, shows asymmetry.

== Causes ==
Several factors, including incubation temperatures and variations, hereditary elements, developmental mishaps, bone morphogenetic protein 4, and management practices, have been identified as potential associations with or causes of crossed beak.

In a 1966 study focused on non-hereditary factors associated with crossed beak, it was identified that fluctuations in incubator temperature, stemming from electrical disruptions, emerged as a primary cause.

Recent studies have identified potential candidate genes for beak deformity in domestic chickens, with several belonging to the keratin family. In a breeding trial involving Appenzeller Barthuhn chickens, believed to have a high genetic predisposition for crossed beak, mating affected parent stock led to a notably higher proportion of offspring with deformed beaks compared to mating unaffected parents. Specifically, mating affected parents resulted in 13 (15.7%) offspring with crossed beak and 67 (80.7%) with normal beaks. Conversely, mating unaffected parents yielded 3 (2.9%) offspring with crossed beak and 95 (93.1%) with normal beaks. These findings suggest a potential hereditary link to beak deformations although the genetic basis of this condition remains unclear. A 2019 study on Huiyang bearded chickens revealed a correlation between the levels of bone morphogenetic protein 4 (BMP4) expression in craniofacial bones and the presence of crossed beak deformities. BMP4 expression was highest in severe cases of crossed beak.

=== Association with unilateral microphthalmia and anophthalmia ===
In 1949, Frederick Bruce Hutt documented non-hereditary beak deformities linked to unilateral microphthalmia or anophthalmia in chick embryos. He observed that most crossed beak cases stemming from these conditions often go unnoticed, as affected chicks typically don't survive the later stages of incubation. Hutt suggested that the abnormality likely arises due to developmental accidents, possibly influenced by unfavorable environmental factors. A 1961 study involving 12 hens and 5 cocks with unilateral microphthalmia or anophthalmia was conducted to investigate the heredity of the associated cross beak deformity. All the offspring produced in the experiment exhibited normal beaks, leading to the conclusion that this specific type of cross beak is not inherited.

== Prevalence ==
Crossed beak has been reported in at least 12 chicken strains worldwide, including commercial strains like leghorn (Landauer, 1938) and Rhode Island Red (Landauer, 1956), as well as native breeds like the Appenzeller Barthuhn, Schweizer (Joller et al., 2018), Chinese silk chicken (Bai et al., 2014, 2016), Beijing-You (Bai et al., 2018a), and Huiyang bearded chicken (Hong et al., 2019), with frequencies ranged from 0.2 to 7.4%. The deformity is present in around 30% of 114 Chinese native chicken strains.

In a 2019 study conducted by Aidin Azizpour on congenital anomalies, 1,796,863 broiler chicks were evaluated. Of these, 56,031 chicks exhibited congenital anomalies, with crossed beak detected in approximately 27.43% of those affected.

The occurrence of crossed beak appears to show no distinction between male and female offspring.

== Impacts ==
Crossed beak in birds lead to decreased feed consumption, hindered growth, subpar production performance, and reduced survival rates. The abnormality poses both economic and animal welfare challenges within the poultry sector.
