= Lists of poultry breeds =

- List of chicken breeds
  - List of German chicken breeds
  - List of French chicken breeds
  - List of Italian chicken breeds
  - List of Spanish chicken breeds
  - Chicken breeds recognized by the American Poultry Association
  - List of true bantam chicken breeds
- List of duck breeds
- List of turkey breeds
- List of goose breeds
- List of pigeon breeds

== By country ==
- Australia - List of breeds in the Australian Poultry Standards
- Italy - List of Italian poultry breeds
- Slovenia - List of Slovenian domestic animal breeds
- UK - List of breeds in the British Poultry Standards
  - Shetland - Shetland animal breeds
- USA - Chicken breeds recognized by the American Poultry Association
