= Silver Appleyard =

British breed of duck

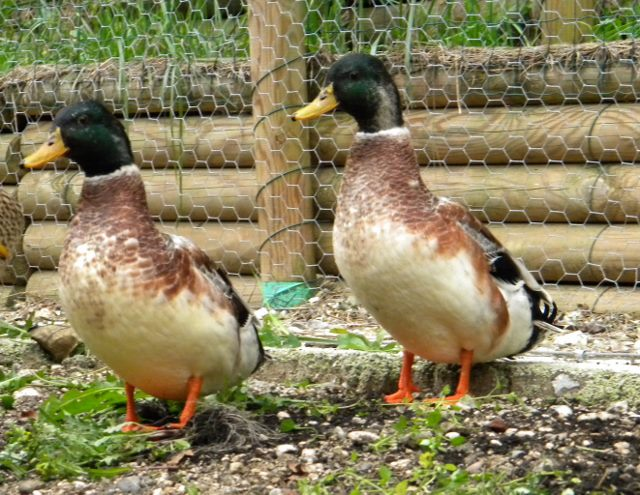
- Drakes in breeding plumage

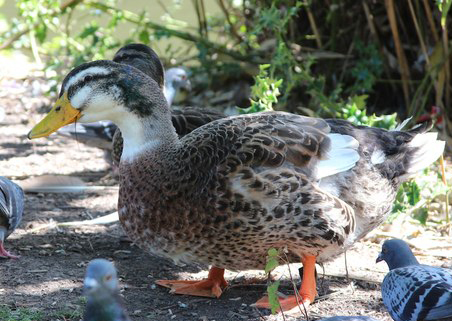
- A drake in molting
- Conservation status: FAO (2007): critically endangered
- Other names: Appleyard
- Country of origin: United Kingdom
- Use: dual-purpose

Traits
- Weight: Male: 3.6–4.1 kg; Female: 3.2–3.6 kg
- Skin colour: white
- Egg colour: white

Classification
- APA: heavy duck
- EE: listed, not recognised
- PCGB: heavy

The Silver Appleyard is a British breed of duck. It was bred in the first half of the twentieth century by Reginald Appleyard, with the aim of creating a dual-purpose breed that would provide both a good quantity of meat and plenty of eggs. Like the majority of breeds of domestic duck, it derives from the wild species Anas platyrhynchos.

== History ==
The Silver Appleyard was bred in the 1930s at Priory Waterfowl Farm near Ixworth, in Suffolk, by Reginald Appleyard, an expert poultry breeder who also created the Ixworth breed of chicken. His aim in creating the breed is described in a leaflet he put out after the end of the Second World War: to create white-skinned duck with a wide, deep breast, which would also be beautiful to look at and would lay abundant white eggs. By the time the pamphlet was issued, his birds had won prizes at the Dairy Show in London and at Bethnal Green. In 1947 a pair of Silver Appleyards was painted by the animal painter Ernest George Wippell. Appleyard worked on the development and stabilisation of the breed until his death in 1964, but never produced a standard. The appearance of his original stock is unknown; when the Silver Appleyard standard was drawn up in 1982, it was based on Wippell's painting.

Some birds were taken to the United States in the 1960s. The breed was added to the Standard of Perfection of the American Poultry Association in 2000. It is listed as "threatened" by the Livestock Conservancy.

There are two small-sized versions of the Silver Appleyard. A Silver Appleyard Bantam was bred by Reginald Appleyard in the 1940s by cross-breeding Khaki Campbell ducks and Call drakes; it thus did not have the same genetic origin as the large bird. The Silver Appleyard Miniature was created in the 1980s by Tom Bartlett of Folly Farm and was recognised as a separate breed in 1997; it is about a third of the size of the large bird, and so is not small enough to be termed a bantam. Appleyard's bantam version was renamed, and is now the Silver Bantam.

== Characteristics ==
The Silver Appleyard is a compact duck of medium length, with a broad and rounded body carried at some 20° to the horizontal. The bill is broad and of medium length; it is yellow with a dark bean, somewhat more greenish in the drake than in the duck. The legs are yellow, the eyes hazel. The plumage is closely similar to that of the Rouen Clair, but with pigmentation of the head and body reduced by the action of the restricted mallard gene.

Body weights are in the range 3.2 to 3.6 kg for ducks, 3.6 to 4.1 kg for drakes.

== Use ==
The Silver Appleyard was created as a dual-purpose breed, reared both for meat and for eggs. Birds for the table may reach a weight of 3 kg at nine weeks; ducks are good layers of white eggs, and may lay some 200–270 per year. The birds are also kept for showing.
