= Schweizer chicken =

Swiss breed of chicken

Schweizer
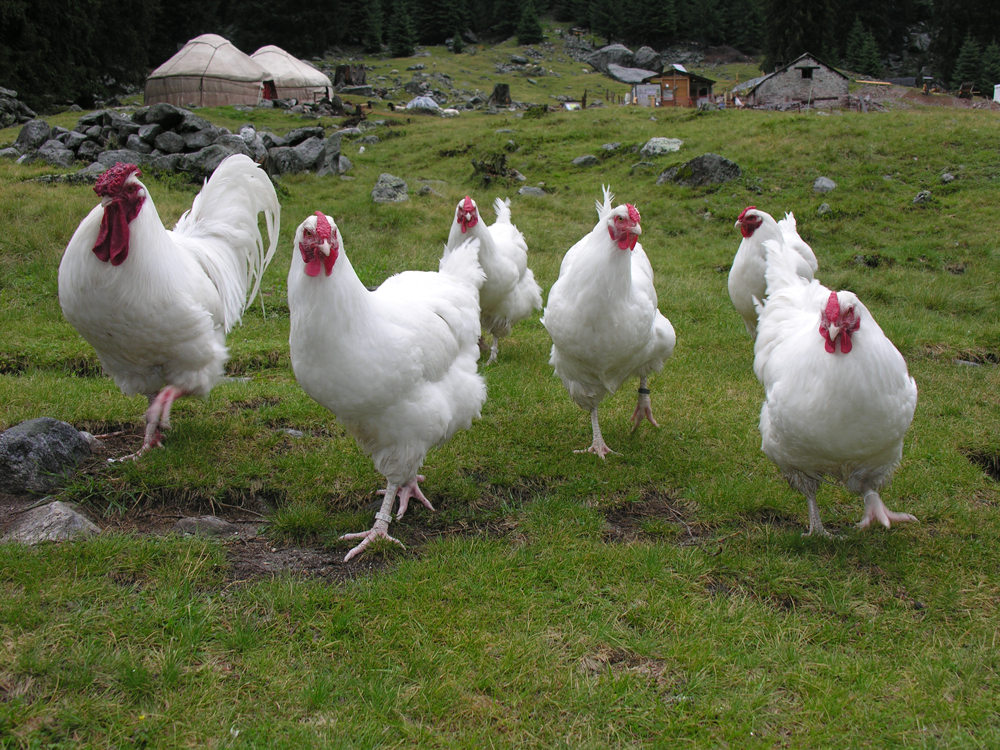
- Conservation status: FAO (2007): endangered; ProSpecieRara (2022): recovering; DAD-IS (2023): unknown
- Other names: Schweizerhuhn; Schweizer Huhn
- Country of origin: Switzerland

Traits
- Weight: Male: 2.8–3.5 kg; Female: 2.4–2.8 kg
- Egg colour: tinted
- Comb type: rose

Classification
- EE: not recognised
- Chicken; Gallus gallus domesticus

The Schweizer, German: Schweizerhuhn or "Swiss chicken", is a Swiss breed of domestic chicken. It was bred in 1905 in Amriswil, in the canton of Thurgau, in north-east Switzerland. It is kept mainly in German-speaking areas of the country. It is one of three Swiss chicken breeds, the others being the Appenzeller Barthuhn and the Appenzeller Spitzhauben.

== History ==
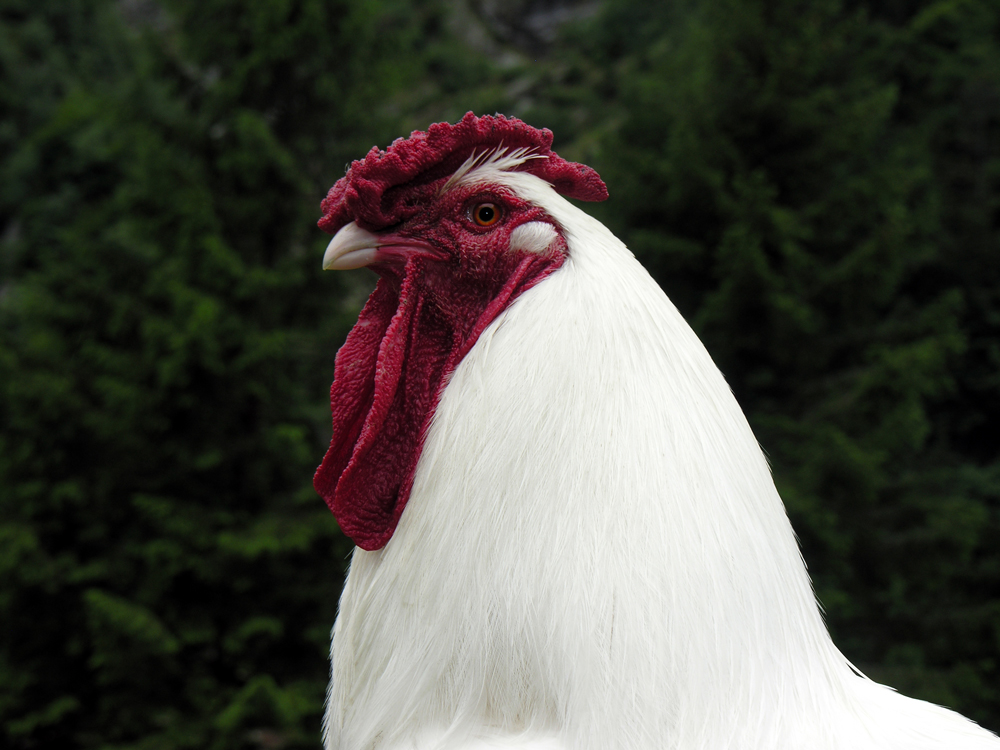
Schweizerhuhn cock

The Schweizer breed was created in 1905 by Alfred Weiss in Amriswil, in the canton of Thurgau, in north-east Switzerland. He cross-bred various chicken breeds, mainly white Orpingtons and Wyandottes, to produce a good dual-purpose chicken. It shows some similarity to the Deutsches Reichshuhn, which was developed at about the same time.

A breed association was formed in 1910, and a breed standard was drawn up. The breed had a period of success between the First and Second World Wars, but after the war the industrialisation of agriculture and the advent of imported hybrid layer breeds led to rapid decline in its numbers. By 1971 the breeders' club had only six members. In 1991, when no more than about fifty of the birds remained, a conservation programme for the breed was launched by ProSpecieRara; a flock-book was established in 1993.

The Schweizer Huhn was listed by the FAO as "endangered" in 2007. It was added to the Swiss Ark of Taste of the Slow Food Foundation in 2009. In 2010 a population of 1600–1650 was reported to DAD-IS. In early 2023 the conservation status of the breed was reported as 'unknown'; according to ProSpecieRara, breed numbers were slowly increasing..

== Characteristics ==
The Schweizer is entirely white, with a vivid red rose comb; red and white are the national colours of Switzerland. The comb is relatively resistant to frost damage, so the birds are well adapted to Swiss weather conditions. Cocks weigh 2.8–3.5 kg and hens 2.4–2.8 kg.

== Use ==
The Schweizer was developed as a dual-purpose chicken, to provide both eggs and meat. Hens lay about 120 or 170–200 tinted eggs per year, with a weight of 55 g or more.
