= Silver Bantam =

British breed of duck

- Country of origin: United Kingdom

Traits
- Weight: Male: 0.9 kg (2.0 lb); Female: 0.8 kg (1.8 lb)

Classification

The Silver Bantam is a British breed of bantam duck, It was bred in the 1940s by Reginald Appleyard from his Silver Appleyard. Like the majority of breeds of domestic duck, it derives from the wild species Anas platyrhynchos.

== History ==
Developed in the late 1940s by Reginald Appleyard in Suffolk with the name "Silver Appleyard Bantam", it was intended to be very attractive and docile ducks. The breed is known to be a crossing of Khaki Campbells and White calls, the duck received very little interest until its standardization in the United Kingdom year 1997 where it received the new name of "Silver Bantam". In the late 1950s and early 1960s a small number of females started to be born with yellow bars on their wings as opposed to their usual color. These unusual females were exceptionally attractive but eventually all died off and no more females have been documented to have been born with similar colors.

== Description ==
Females have a buff-colored “hood” on their head and can weigh up to 0.8 kilograms (1.8 pounds) whilst the males have an iridescent green hood when in nuptial plumage during the breeding season, similar to that of the wild mallard, and a black hood when in eclipse plumage that disguises their body of 0.9 kilograms (2.0 pounds). Females can lay in between 60 and 160 small eggs every year. The duck is also known to be tame and easy to manage.

== Conservation ==
As of 2007, the FAO marked the duck as "Critical". In 2002 the total population was estimated to be between 50 and 100 individuals.
