= Indian Runner duck =

Breed of duck

Indian Runner
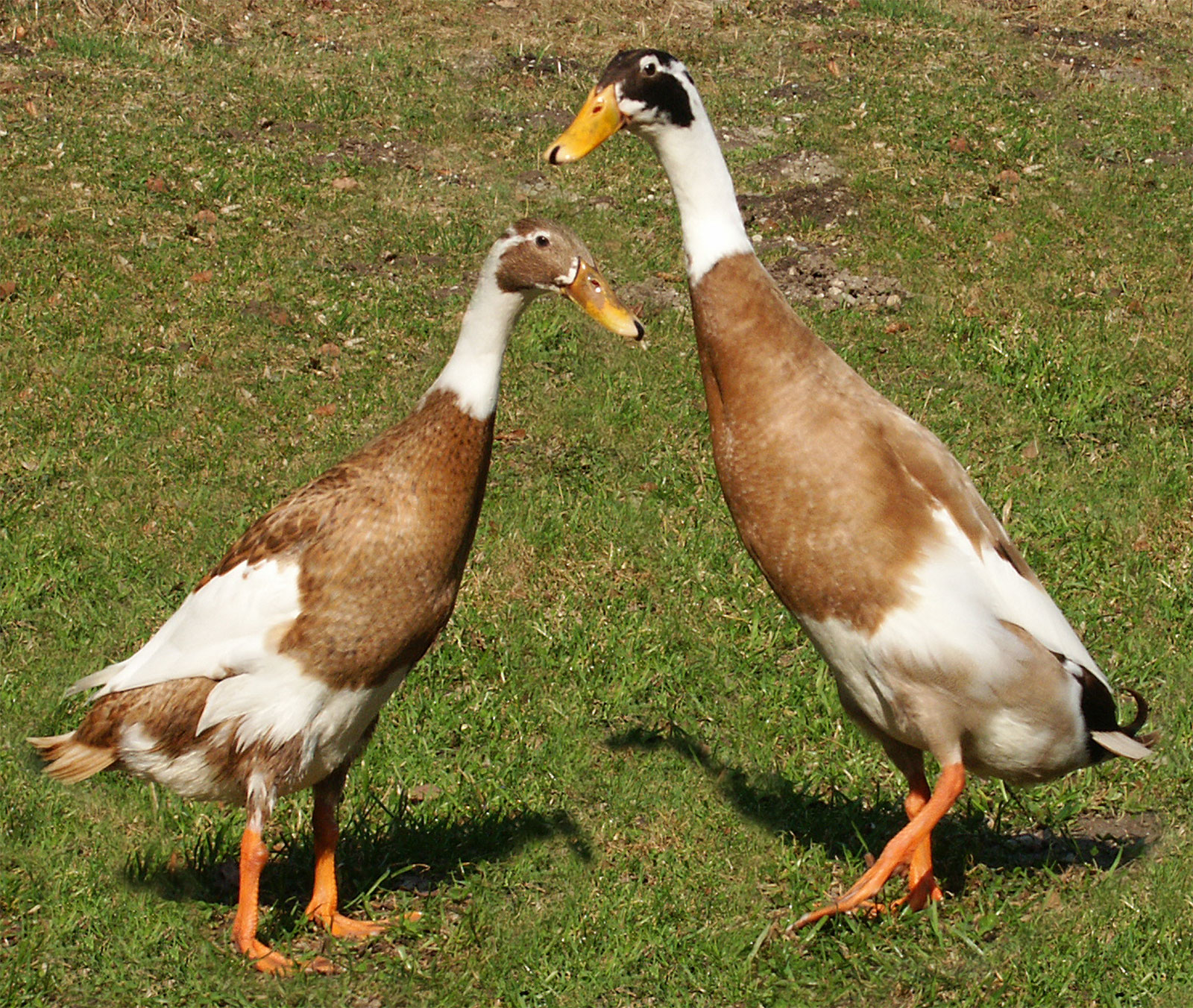
- Country of origin: Indonesia

Traits
- Weight: Male: 1.6–2.3 kg (3.5–5.1 lb); Female: 1.4–2.0 kg (3.1–4.4 lb)
- Skin color: Pink
- Egg color: Greenish blue
- Comb type: None

Classification
- PCGB: light
- Duck; Anas platyrhynchos domesticus

Indian Runners or Runner ducks are a breed of Anas platyrhynchos domesticus, the domestic duck. They stand erect like penguins and, rather than waddling or flying, they run. They were bred on the Indonesian islands of Lombok, Java and Bali. Egg production has been measured at over 173 eggs per year; much higher claims have been made without reliable evidence. The breed arrived in the Western world in the 19th century; they have since been bred to have a wide variety of colours.

== Description ==
Indian Runner ducks vary in weight between 1.4 and 2.3 kg (3.1 and 5.1 lb). Their height (from crown to tail tip) ranges from 50 cm (20 in) in small females to about 76 cm (30 in) in the taller males. The erect carriage is a result of a pelvic girdle that is closer to the tail than other breeds of domestic duck. This structural feature allows the birds to walk or run, rather than waddle, as seen with other duck breeds; they do not fly. (Note: The geneticist Reginald Punnett noted in 1932 that an F1 hybrid with a mallard duck could fly "as strongly as the Mallard parent.")

Indian Runner ducks have a long, wedge-shaped head. The bill blends into the head smoothly being as straight as possible from bean to the back of the skull. The head is shallower than is seen with most other breeds of duck. This effect gives a racy appearance, a breed trait. Eye placement is high on the head. Indian Runners have long, slender necks that smoothly transition into the body. The body is long, slim but round in appearance.

The breed is known for its high egg production, but estimates of this vary widely. The Livestock Conservancy give a figure of "over 250 eggs" per year without supporting evidence. Claims of as many as 300 eggs per year were published by American breeders for individual ducks in 1912–1914. Ioan Custura and colleagues in 2021 observed breeding birds at the University of Agricultural Sciences and Veterinary Medicine Bucharest, stating that egg production was on average 173.74 eggs per bird in Indian Runners, intermediate between their measurements of 189.77 for Khaki Campbells and 120.42 for "Peking ducks".

== Origins ==
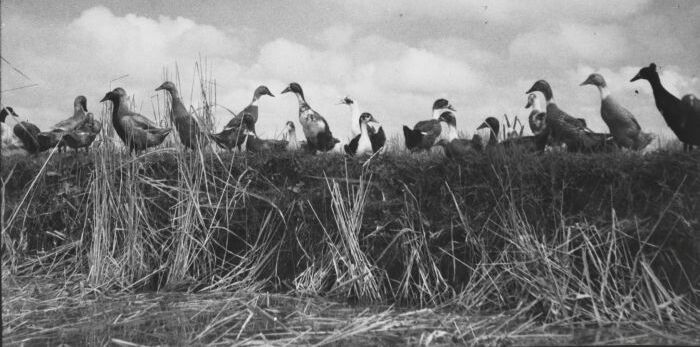
Indian Runner ducks in a paddy field, Indonesia c. 1941

Indian Runner ducks are originally from Indonesia when the region was known as the East Indies, earning them the name "Indian". They appear to be represented in stone sculptures in Java from c. 1000 AD. In 1856, the naturalist Alfred Russel Wallace recorded in The Malay Archipelago that the ducks in the Indonesian island of Lombok "walk erect, like penguins".

== Rice-duck farming ==
Rice-duck farming is a polycultural practice of raising ducks as well as growing rice on the same land, providing farmers with additional income, while the manure produced by the ducks benefits the rice crop. This system has existed in different forms for centuries in Asian countries including China, Indonesia, and the Philippines.

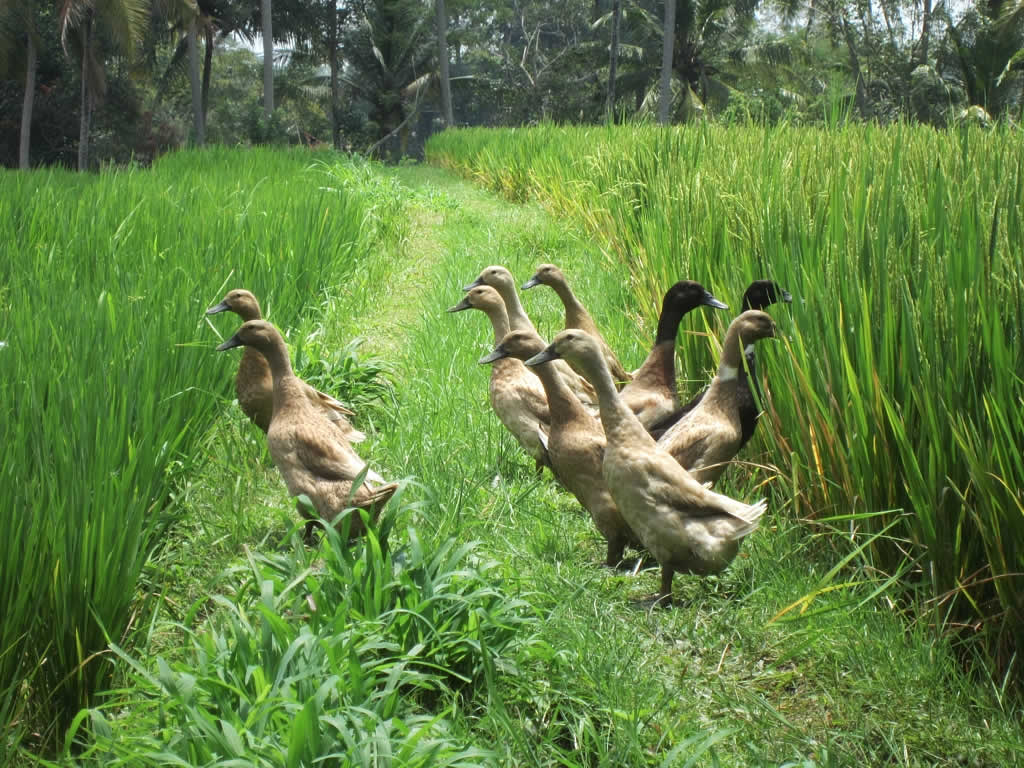
Ducks with free access to rice paddies in Bali, Indonesia provide additional income and manure the fields, reducing the need for fertilizer.

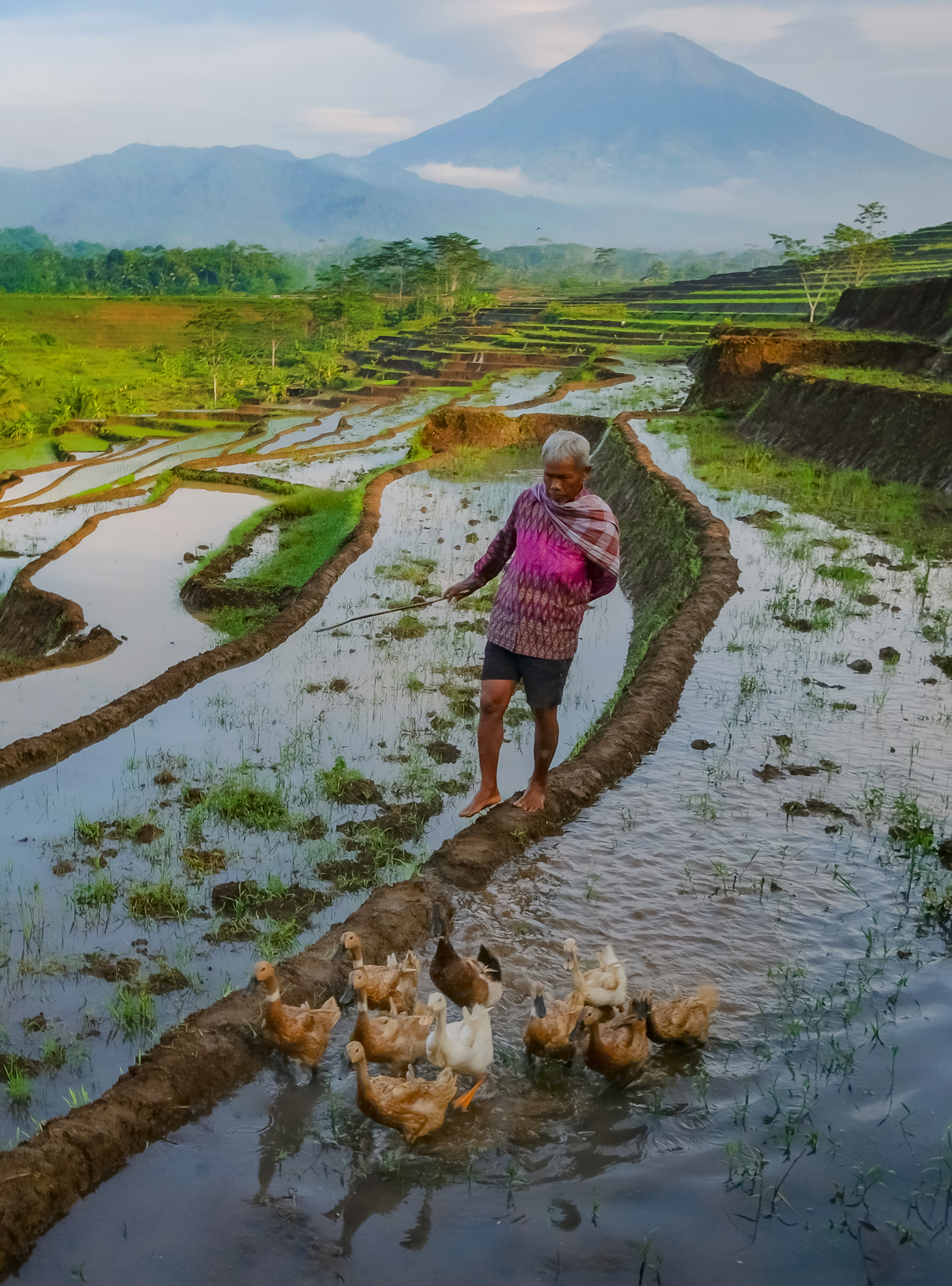
A farmer herds his ducks in Central Java

== Breeding in the Western world ==
=== Arrival ===
The Runner became popular in Europe and America as an egg-laying variety towards the end of the nineteenth century largely as a result of an undated pamphlet called The India Runner: its History and Description published by John Donald of Wigton between 1885 and 1890. Donald's publication is advertised briefly in The Feathered World, 1895, under the title of "The Indian Runner Duck". Donald describes the pied variety, and gives the popular story of the importation into Cumbria in Northwest England by a sea captain some fifty years earlier.

The breed is unusual not only for its high egg production but also for its upright stance and variety of colour genes, some of which are seen in seventeenth-century Dutch paintings by the d'Hondecoeter family and others. Other references to such domestic ducks use the names 'Penguin Ducks' and 'Baly Soldiers'. Harrison Weir's Our Poultry (1902) describes the Penguin Ducks belonging to Mr. Edward Cross in the Surrey Zoological Gardens between 1837 and 1838. These may well have been imported by the 13th Earl of Derby. Charles Darwin describes them (1868) as having elongated "femur and meta-tarsi", contrary to William Tegetmeier's assertions.

The Cumbrian importations, according to Matthew Smith in 1923, included completely fawn Runners and completely white Runners as well as the pied (fawn-and-white and grey-and-white) varieties. The most successful attempt to import fresh bloodlines was by Joseph Walton between 1908 and 1909. Accounts of these ventures can be found in Coutts (1927) and Ashton (2002). Walton shipped in birds from Lombok and Java, revolutionizing the breeding stock which, according to Donald, had become badly mixed with local birds. Further importations by Miss Chisholm and Miss Davidson in 1924 and 1926 continued to revive the breed.

=== Development ===
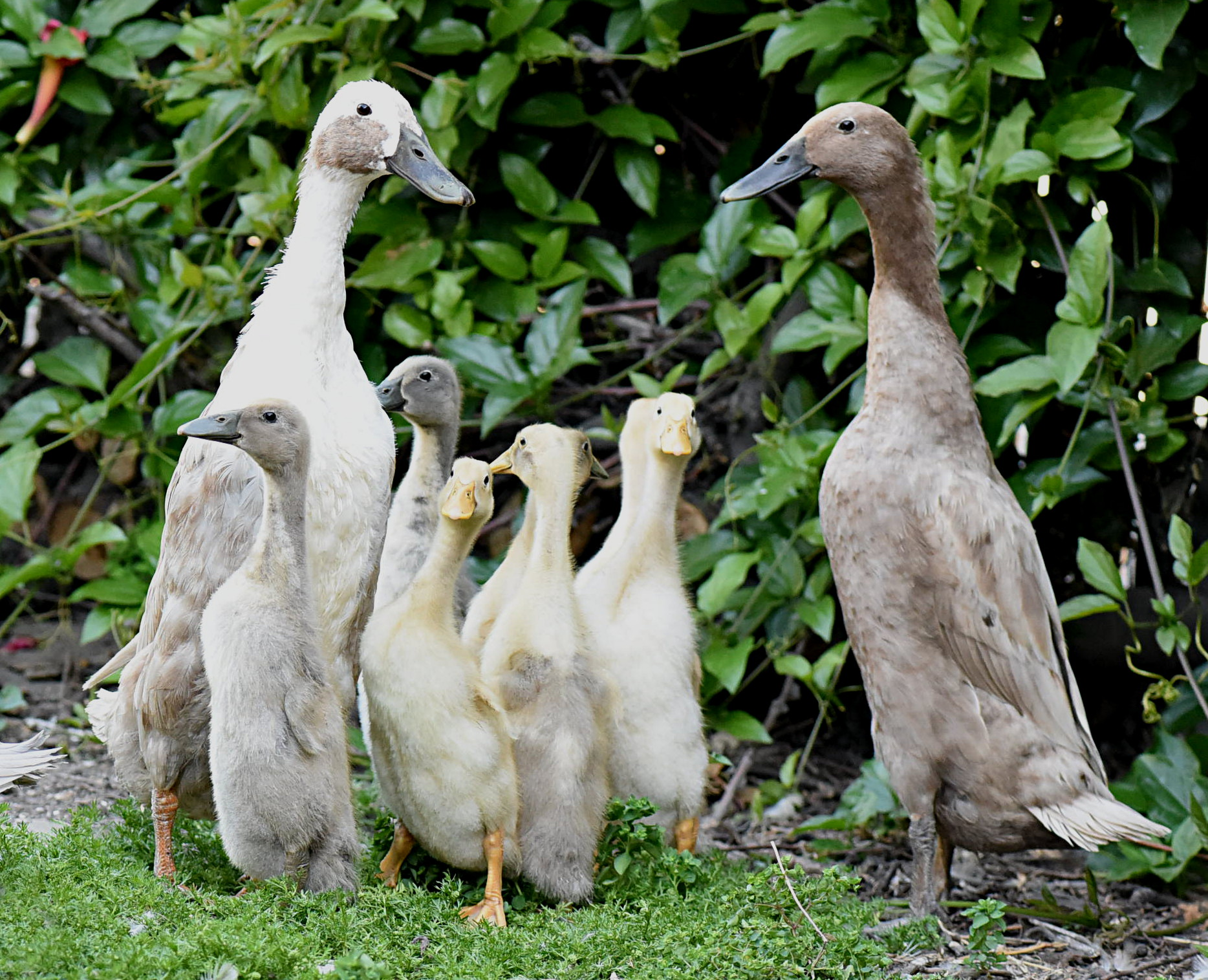
A family of Indian Runner ducks, clearly showing their upright posture

Pure breed enthusiasts, exhibitors and show judges wanted to establish standard descriptions. Standards were drawn up in by the Waterfowl Club in England (1897) and America (1898) for the pied colour varieties. These were largely the same until 1915 when the two countries diverged. The American Poultry Association chose a variety with blue in the genotype whilst the English Poultry Club Standard kept to the pure form described by Donald in his original pamphlet. Other colours followed making use of black genes brought in by some of Walton's birds. These were to produce black, chocolate and Cumberland blue. Later were developed the mallard, trout, blue trout, and apricot trout versions. Slightly different names and descriptions can be found in American and German standards. An account of the influence of the Indian Runner Duck Club (founded in 1906), particularly the input by John Donald, Joseph Walton, Dr J. A. Coutts and Matthew Smith, can be found in Ashton (2002).

The most profound impact of the Indian Runners was on the development of the modern 'light duck' breeds. Before 1900, most ducks were bred for the table. Aylesbury and Rouen ducks were famous throughout the nineteenth century, and these were supplemented or replaced, after 1873–74, by importation from China of the Pekin duck. As soon as the Indian Runners became fashionable, a demand for egg-layers and general purpose breeds developed. Using Runners crossed to Rouens, Aylesburys and Cayugas (the large black American breed), William Cook produced his famous Orpington Ducks. Mrs Campbell crossed her fawn-and-white Runner duck to a Rouen drake to create the Campbell ducks introduced in 1898. Later, she introduced wild mallard blood and managed to create the most prolific egg-layer, the Khaki Campbell (announced in 1901). Other breeds followed, some of which emerged as direct mutations of the Khaki Campbell, along with crosses back to Indian Runners, the most famous being the Abacot Ranger (known in Germany as the Streicher) and the Welsh Harlequin. Currently there are eight varieties of Indian Runner recognized with the American Poultry Association. They are, in order of recognition, Fawn & White, White, Penciled, Black, Buff, Chocolate, Cumberland Blue, and Gray.

=== Colour breeding ===
Indian Runner ducks brought in unusual plumage colour mutations. These included the dusky and restricted mallard genes, light phase, harlequin phase, blue and brown dilutions, as well as the famous pied varieties named by the geneticist F. M. Lancaster as the 'Runner pattern'. Much of the proliferation of new colour varieties in breeds of domestic duck begins with the importation of these oriental ducks. Original research by R. G. Jaap (1930s) and F. M. Lancaster has allowed breeders to understand the effect of genotypes in managing and creating colour varieties. Simplified information can be found in writings by Dave Holderread, and Mike and Chris Ashton.

== See also ==
- List of duck breeds
