= Derbyshire Redcap =

Breed of chicken

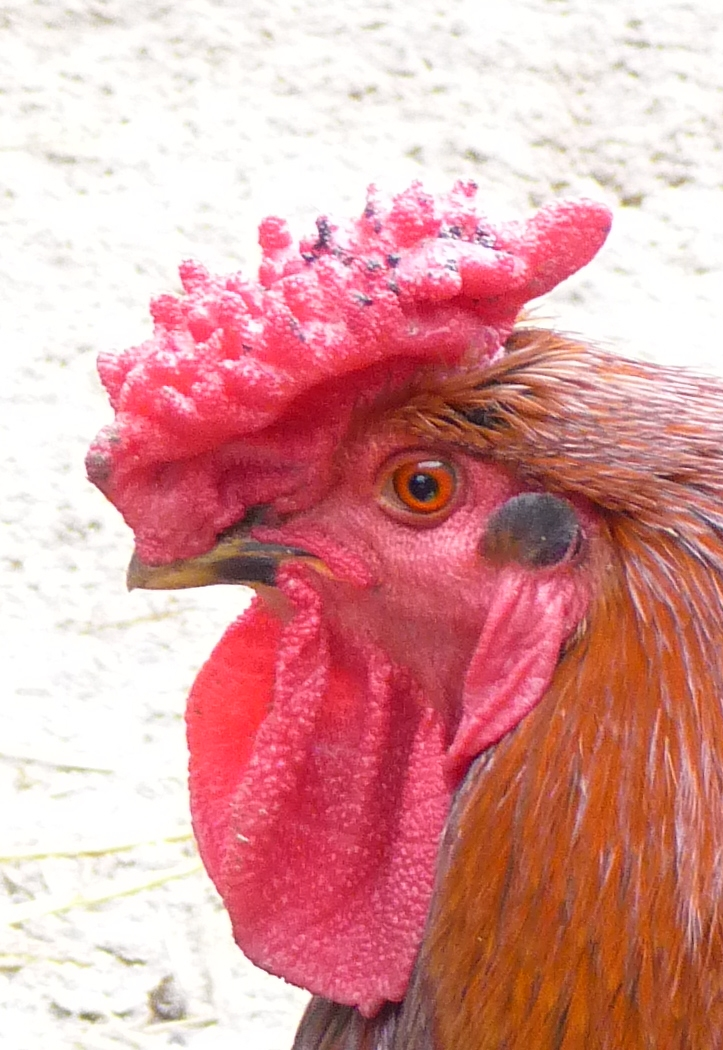
- A Derbyshire Redcap cock
- Conservation status: RBST (UK): at risk
- Other names: Redcap
- Nicknames: Coral
- Country of origin: United Kingdom
- Use: eggs, meat

Traits
- Weight: Male: 3.4 kg (7.5 lb); Female: 2.75 kg (6.1 lb)
- Skin color: blue-grey
- Egg color: white
- Comb type: rose

Classification
- APA: English
- ABA: rose comb clean legged
- PCGB: soft feather: light
- Chicken; Gallus gallus domesticus

The Derbyshire Redcap is a breed of chicken originating in the English county of Derbyshire. The name "Redcap" derives from the breed's unusually large Rose-type comb. British breed standards dictate a length of more than 7 centimetres (3 inches) of length for a Redcap comb. It is covered in small, fleshy points, and has a distinct spike pointing backwards called a "leader". Combs, wattles and earlobes are all ideally bright red.

== Characteristics ==
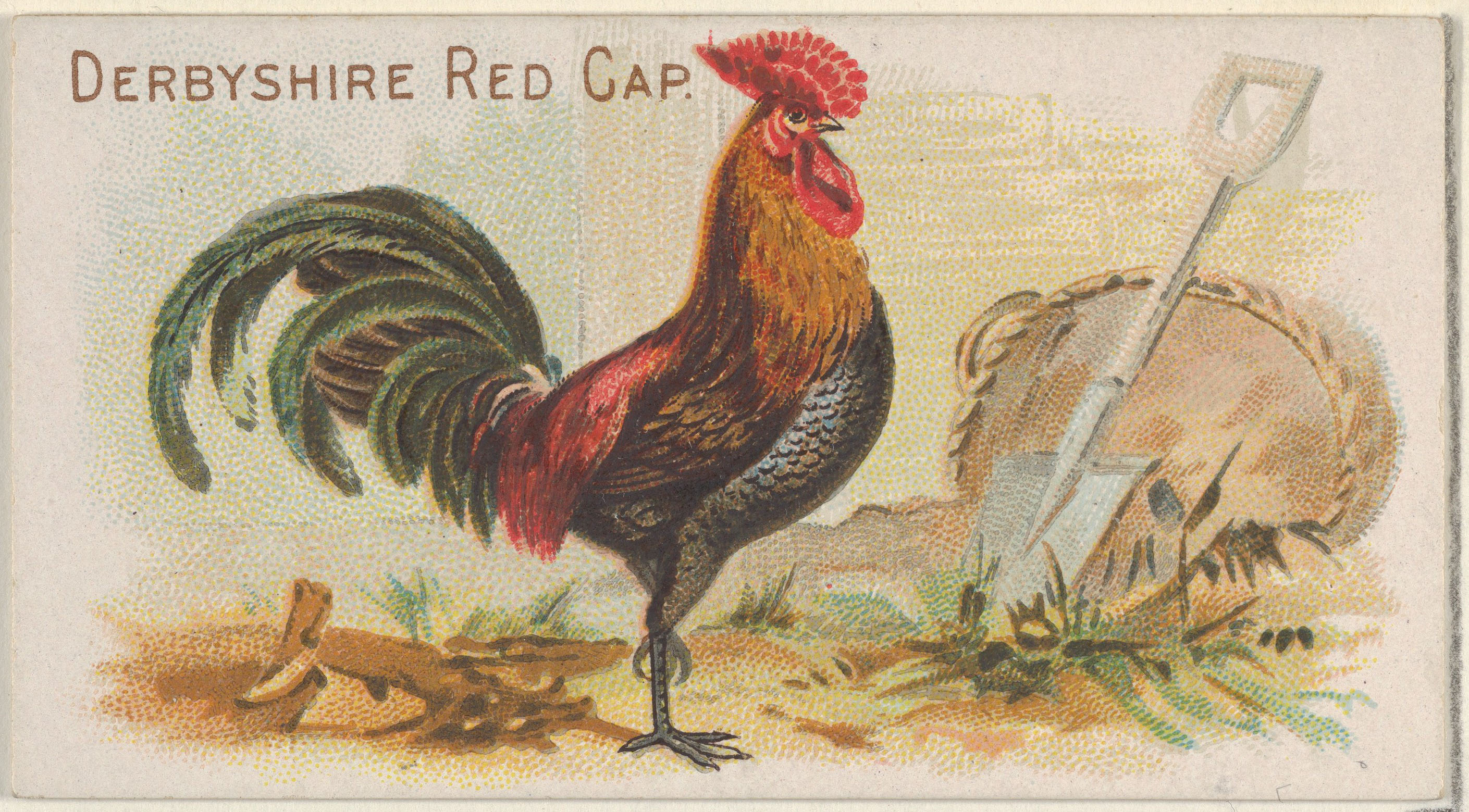
An illustration of Derbyshire Redcap

Redcaps are classified as a light fowl, with cocks weighing approximately 3.4 kilograms (7.5 lb) and hens 2.75 kg (6.1 lb). Redcaps can be differentiated from similar looking breeds, especially the more popular Hamburgs, by their red earlobes and larger comb. Beaks are horn-coloured. Combs which hang to either side of the face, white earlobes, or a lack of points on the comb are undesirable traits according to the breed standards, and result in disqualification from poultry shows. The breed appears in a single variety of plumage, with various dark hues of red, brown and black. Cocks display a greater diversity of colour, but both males and females have black tails and a crescent shape of black on the edge of most body feathers.

Derbyshire Redcaps are a hardy, active breed of chicken that does well in free range conditions. They are well suited for dual-purpose farm flocks, being used for both meat and egg production in addition to their ornamental qualities. Hens do not usually go broody, and lay a good amount of large, white coloured eggs.

== History ==
The exact breeds that contributed to the creation of the Redcap are unknown, but Golden Spangled Hamburgs, Dorkings, Old English Pheasant Fowl and Black-Breasted Red Games may have been involved. The breed is also very similar in conformation to now-extinct chickens such as the Yorkshire Pheasant and the Lancashire Moonie.

Derbyshire Redcaps were common on British farms until the middle of the 20th century, particularly around the southern Pennines. They have never been preferred by intensive farms or commercial operations, and have always been primarily a barnyard fowl. In the 21st century, they are a very rare chicken, with the largest numbers still residing in their home country. The Rare Breeds Survival Trust of the UK lists them as Vulnerable on their watch list. Abroad, Redcaps were admitted to the American Poultry Association's Standard of Perfection in 1888, and are listed as Critical on the American Livestock Breeds Conservancy watchlist.
