= Welsh Harlequin =

British breed of duck

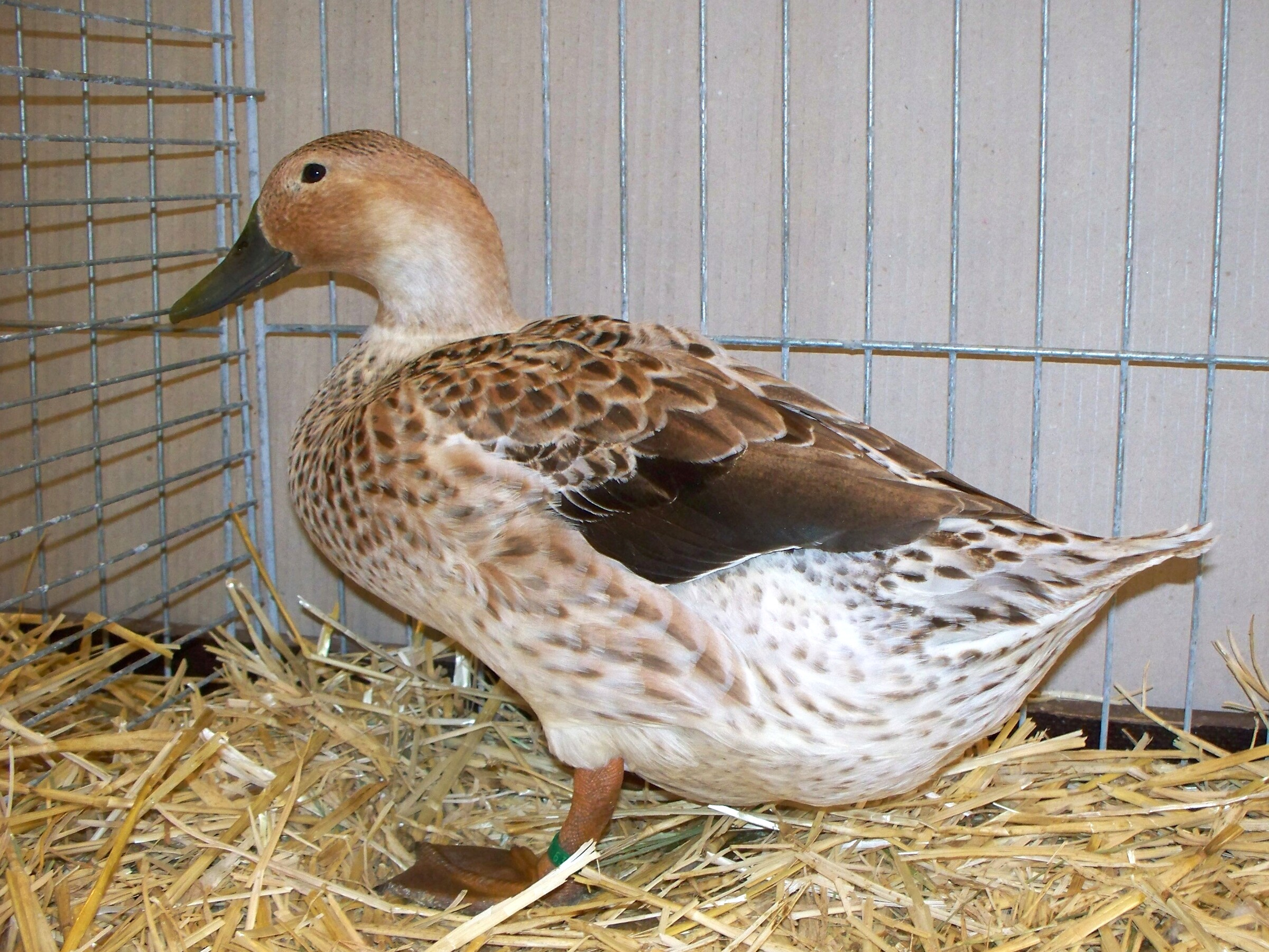

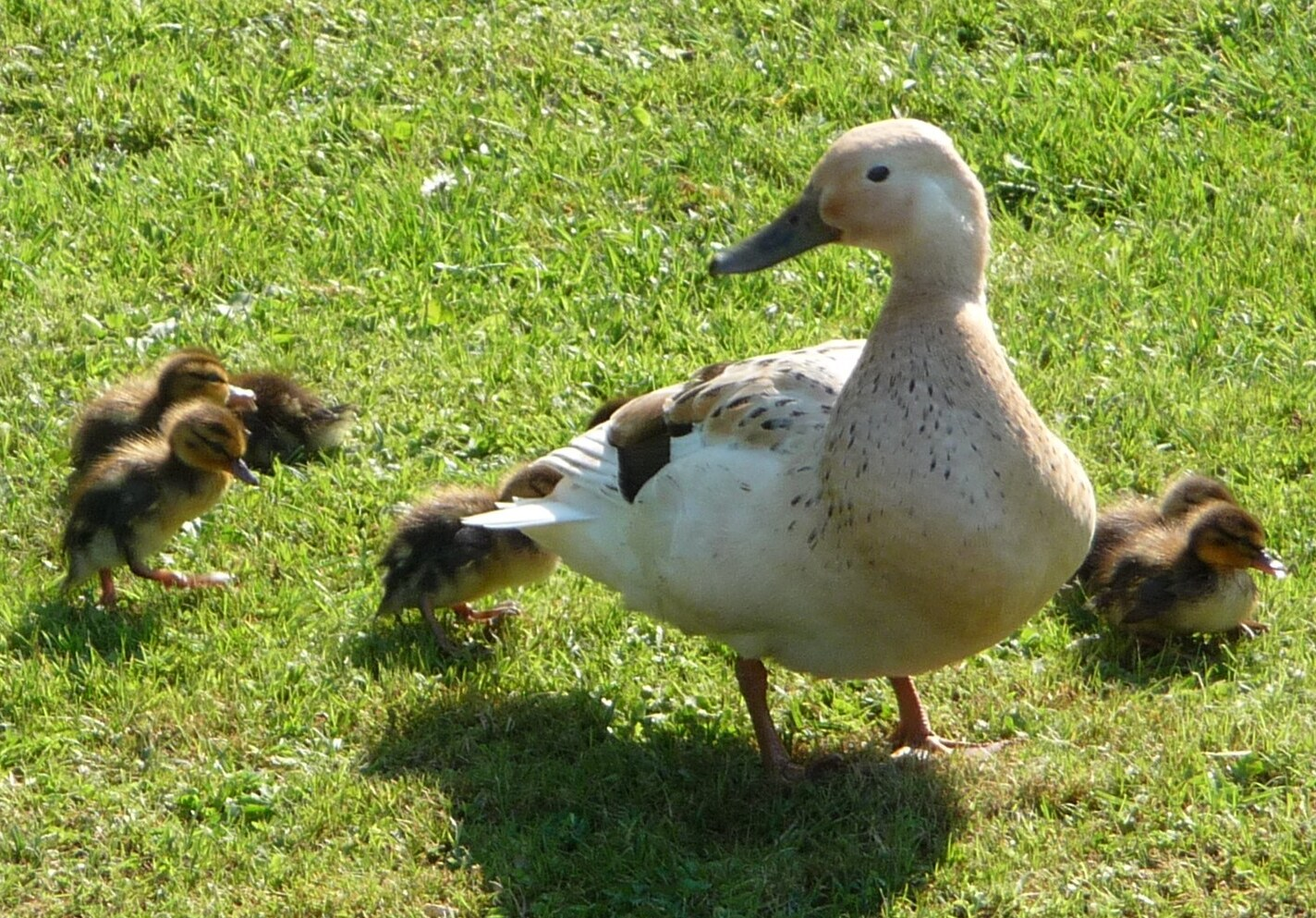
- Duck with ducklings
- Conservation status: FAO (2007): critical; DAD-IS (2026): at risk/endangered; RBST (2026): priority
- Country of origin: United Kingdom

Traits
- Weight: Male: 2.3–2.5 kg; Female: 2.0–2.3 kg

Classification
- APA: yes
- EE: yes
- PCGB: light
- Duck; Anas platyrhynchos

The Welsh Harlequin is a British breed of domestic duck. It was bred from 1949 in Hertfordshire by Leslie Bonnet from two colour mutations he found in his flock of Khaki Campbells; the results were initially known as Honey Campbells, but were renamed 'Welsh Harlequin' after Bonnet moved with his family to Wales. It has no connection to the Icelandic wild duck species Histrionicus histrionicus.

== History ==
The Welsh Harlequin was bred in the years after the Second World War by Leslie Bonnet, a group captain in the Royal Air Force, at his family home in the village of Flaunden, in Hertfordshire. He had kept chickens, but had trouble with coccidiosis and so switched to Khaki Campbell ducks. In 1949 two ducklings of an unusual honey colour – the result of a colour mutation – were hatched in his flock. From them he started a line of honey-coloured birds which he called 'Honey Campbells'. Not long afterwards he moved his family and his flock of ducks to Criccieth, in Gwynedd in north-west Wales; in about 1950 he renamed his honey-coloured stock 'Welsh Harlequin', reportedly in the hope of selling some to a wealthy local landowner who kept only Welsh breeds. The breed became well-known; Bonnet sold stock to many parts of the world and at times may have had 5000 birds in his flock.

He also bred another line – the offspring of two ducks of Aylesbury type and a Harlequin drake – to create what he called the 'Whalesbury Hybrid', a heavier bird which he hoped would yield more meat. In colour it was more variable than the Harlequin and more similar to the Abacot Ranger. In 1968 his flock was critically reduced by foxes, and he combined the two lines, naming the resulting mixed stock the 'New Welsh Harlequin'.

The modern breed descends from some birds of Bonnet's original stock bought from him in 1963 by Edward Grayson of Rufford, near Ormskirk in Lancashire. From about 1983 Grayson bred these with Khaki Campbells of the original type – from which they differed only in colouration – and succeeded in re-establishing a stable colour form similar to the original. He also contributed to the formation of a breed society, the Welsh Harlequin Duck Club, which drew up a revised breed standard to replace that published in 1982 by the Poultry Club of Great Britain, which was considered to be inaccurate; this standard was accepted by the British Waterfowl Association in 1987, and was published by the Poultry Club of Great Britain 1997. The breed became more widespread after the publication of the new standard and was commonly seen at poultry shows.

By 1968, hatching eggs were exported to the United States, followed by the importation of live birds in 1981. The Welsh Harlequin was added to the Standard of Perfection of the American Poultry Association in 2001.

In the twenty-first century it is reported by four countries: Australia, Ireland, New Zealand and the United Kingdom. It is an endangered breed, with an estimated total world-wide population in 2026 of 223 birds. Its conservation status was listed in 2026 as 'priority' by the Rare Breeds Survival Trust, as 'watch' by the Livestock Conservancy and as 'unknown/at risk' in the DAD-IS database.

== Characteristics ==
The Welsh Harlequin is a light duck: body weights are ideally in the range 2.0–2.3 kg for ducks and 2.3–2.5 kg for drakes.

Over the years the colour and conformation of the breed has changed, indicating that likely new blood of another breed has been introduced. Females have a black bill and brown legs and feet, and their plumage is similar to a mallard but heavily frosted with white. They also lack the eye stripes of mallard females. Drakes are also similar to a heavily frosted Mallard with a yellow/green bill and orange legs and feet. There is also a colour variation known as "golden", popular in the UK, which replaces the black feather pigments with a light golden brown colour. Welsh Harlequins have a unique, natural sex-linked characteristic. As day olds, sex can be determined based on bill colour with over 90% accuracy. Young drakes will have darker bills while female with have lighter with a dark spot at the tip of the bill.

== Use ==
The number of eggs laid per year is variously given as 80, as more than 200 or as 240 to 330. The eggs are white, and weigh about 65 g.
