= Ixworth chicken =

British breed of chicken

Ixworth
- Conservation status: FAO (2007): endangered/maintainedRBST (2014): at risk; DAD-IS (2025): unknown
- Country of origin: United Kingdom
- Use: dual-purpose

Traits
- Weight: Male: Standard: 3.6–4.1 kg; Bantam: 1020 g; Female: Standard: 2.7–3.2 kg; Bantam: 790 g
- Skin colour: white
- Egg colour: tinted
- Comb type: pea comb

Classification
- APA: no
- EE: listed, not recognised
- PCGB: rare soft feather: heavy
- Chicken; Gallus gallus domesticus

The Ixworth is a British breed of white domestic chicken. It is named for the village of Ixworth in Suffolk, where it was created in 1932. It was bred as fast-growing high-quality meat breed with reasonable laying abilities.

== History ==
The Ixworth was created in 1932 by Reginald Appleyard, who also created the Silver Appleyard Duck, at his poultry farm in the village of Ixworth in Suffolk. It was bred from white Sussex, white Minorca, white Orpington and several variants of Indian Game, with the intention of creating a dual-purpose breed, a fast-growing high-quality meat bird with reasonable egg-laying ability. An Ixworth bantam was created in 1938; Appleyard thought it better than the standard-sized bird.

In the 1970s the Ixworth almost disappeared; it has since gradually recovered. It is a rare breed: in 2007 it was listed by the Food and Agriculture Organization of the United Nations as "endangered-maintained". In 2008 it was listed as "Category 2: endangered" by the Rare Breeds Survival Trust, and in 2014 was on the Trust's list of native poultry breeds at risk.

== Characteristics ==
The plumage of the Ixworth is pure white. The comb is of pea type; it and the face, earlobes and wattles are brilliant red. The eyes are bright orange or red. The beak, shanks, feet, skin and flesh are all white.

In a comparative study conducted at the Roslin Institute in 2003, Ixworth hens were found to reach a live weight of 4.03 kg at 55 weeks, and to lay on average 0.74 eggs per day, with an average egg weight of 61 g.

The meat commands premium prices.
