= Appenzeller string music =

Music from Appenzell, Switzerland

String music from Appenzell plays an important role in the instrumental practice of the region. The first songs from Appenzell originated in the 13th century, composed by Heinrich von Sax, Lord of Castle Clanx, around 1270. In the 16th century, an Appenzeller Kuereien Lobelobe, a type of yodel, was composed. Until the end of the 17th century, common instruments such as the drums, pipes, bagpipes, and shalms were also prevalent in this region.

Nineteenth-century ensembles from the region included The Alder Streichmusik from Urnäsch (founded in 1884), and the "original" Streich-Quintett Appenzell (founded in 1892), a quintet featuring two violins, a dulcimer, a cello and a double bass. The Streichmusik Schmid of Walzenhausen emerged around 1900. In 1913 Streichmusik Edelweiss of Trogen was established by Hans Rechsteiner.

Representatives of this music include or have included Streichmusik Alder, Streichmusik Schmid, Streichmusik Edelweiss Herisau, Streichmusik Hornsepp, Streichmusik Weissbad, Streichmusik Alperösli, Geschwister Küng, Frauestriichmusig, Streichmusik Bänziger, Toggenburger Original Striichmusig, Brandhölzer Striichmusig, Streichmusik Kalöi, Appenzeller Echo, and many more.The repertoire of Appenzell instrumental music and yodeling is documented and regularly updated by the Center for Folk Music from Appenzell in the Roothuus.Gonten.
