= Appenzeller Spitzhauben =

Swiss breed of chicken

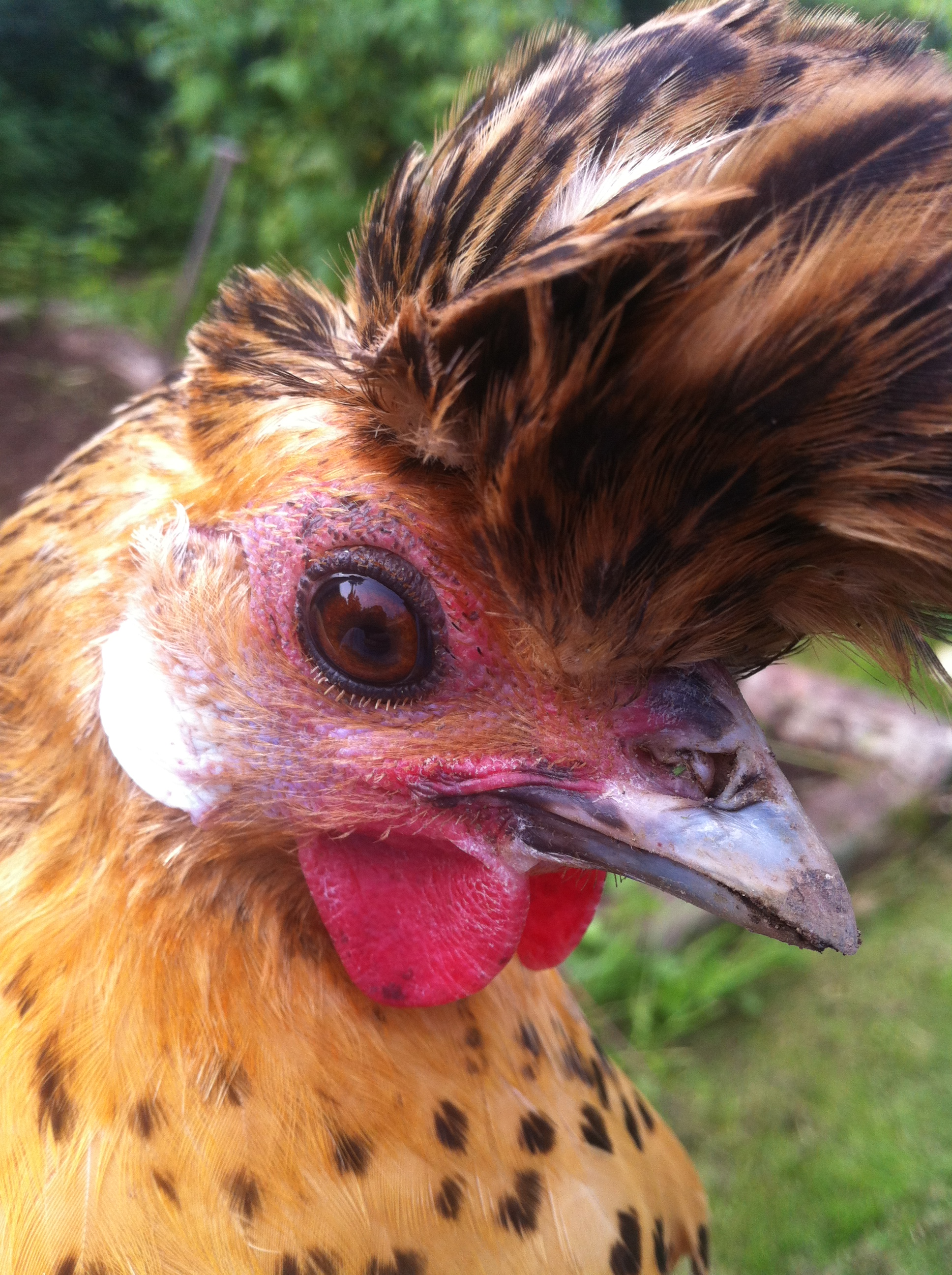
- Head of a gold-spangled hen
- Conservation status: SAVE Foundation (2003): critical; FAO (2007): not at risk; DAD-IS (2022): at risk
- Other names: Alemannic German: Gässerschnäpfli; Alemannic German: Tschüpperli
- Country of origin: Switzerland
- Distribution: Switzerland; Austria; Germany
- Use: eggs

Classification
- APA: no
- EE: yes
- PCGB: soft feather light
- Chicken; Gallus gallus domesticus

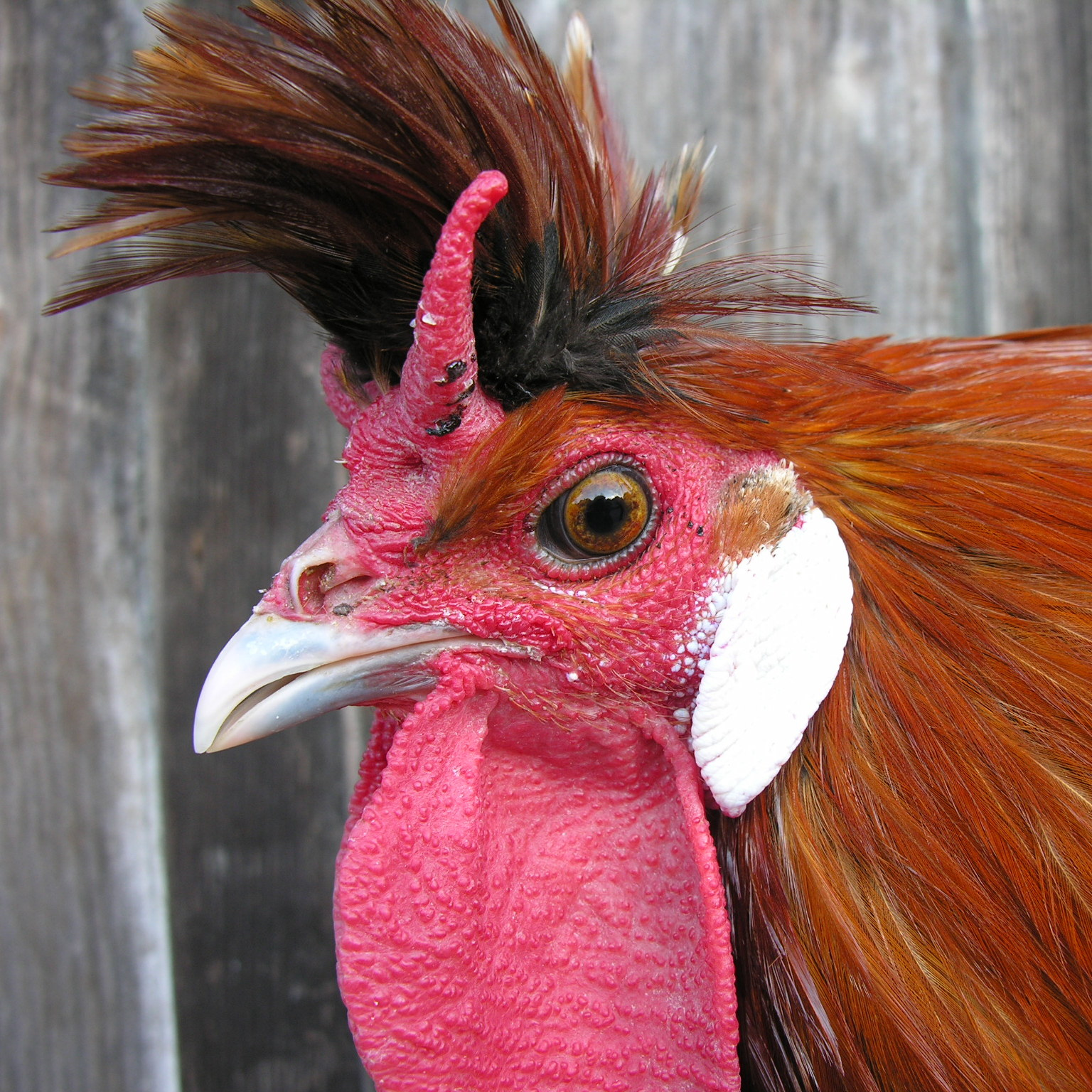
Head of a cock, showing the v-shaped comb

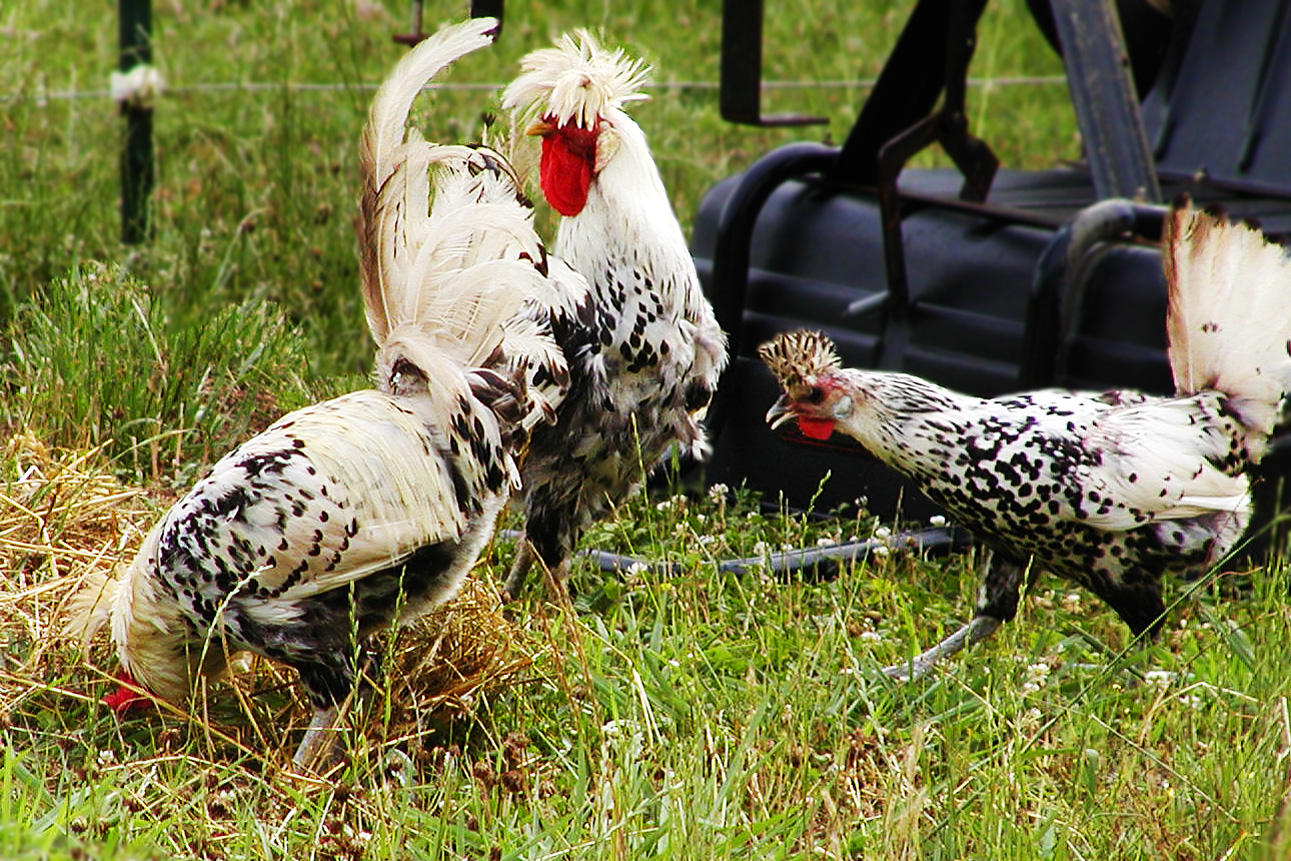
A Silver Spangled Appenzeller Spitzhauben trio: two cocks (at left) and a hen

The Appenzeller Spitzhauben is a Swiss breed of crested chicken originating in the historical Appenzell region of Switzerland. It is one of two chicken breeds from that area, the other being the Appenzeller Barthuhn; the only other Swiss breed of chicken is the Schweizer.

== History ==
The origins of the Spitzhauben are unknown. It has been bred in the mountains of the Alpine region for hundreds of years. A similar breed, the Brabanter of the Low Countries, is shown in paintings of the seventeenth century; it has been suggested that the Spitzhauben may have originated at about that time.

In the twentieth century it was found only in the historical Appenzell region of Switzerland – the "half-cantons" of Appenzell Ausserrhoden and Appenzell Innerrhoden. Some birds were shown in 1935 at the national poultry show, but by about 1950 the Spitzhauben was close to extinction. A recovery project was launched in 1983 with the help of ProSpecieRara; 230 chicks were hatched in that year. A flock-book was started in 2005; in 2019 the recorded population consisted of 243 hens and 153 cocks.

== Characteristics ==
The Spitzhauben is a light chicken: hens weigh little more than a kilogram, and cock birds barely over 1.5 kg. It is an active breed that does not do well in close confinement, can forage well, and will roost in trees if given the opportunity. In North America, it is very rare and is recognized officially by neither the American Poultry Association or other breed registries. The silver-spangled Spitzhauben is the most common variety.

The Spitzhauben variety, meaning "pointed bonnet", has a V-comb and feather crests in males and females. The word spitzhauben derives from a ceremonial hat worn by the women in the Appenzeller region in Switzerland. The breed was imported into America by a doctor. Spitzhauben are recognised by the EE Standard commission in the following colours: silver-spangled, gold-spangled, lemon-spangled, chamois-spangled, pure black and pure blue.

Ring size is 16 mm for cocks and 15 mm for hens.

== Use ==
Hens may lay some 150 white-shelled eggs in their first year, with an average weight of 55 g.
