= Abacot Ranger =

Breed of domestic duck

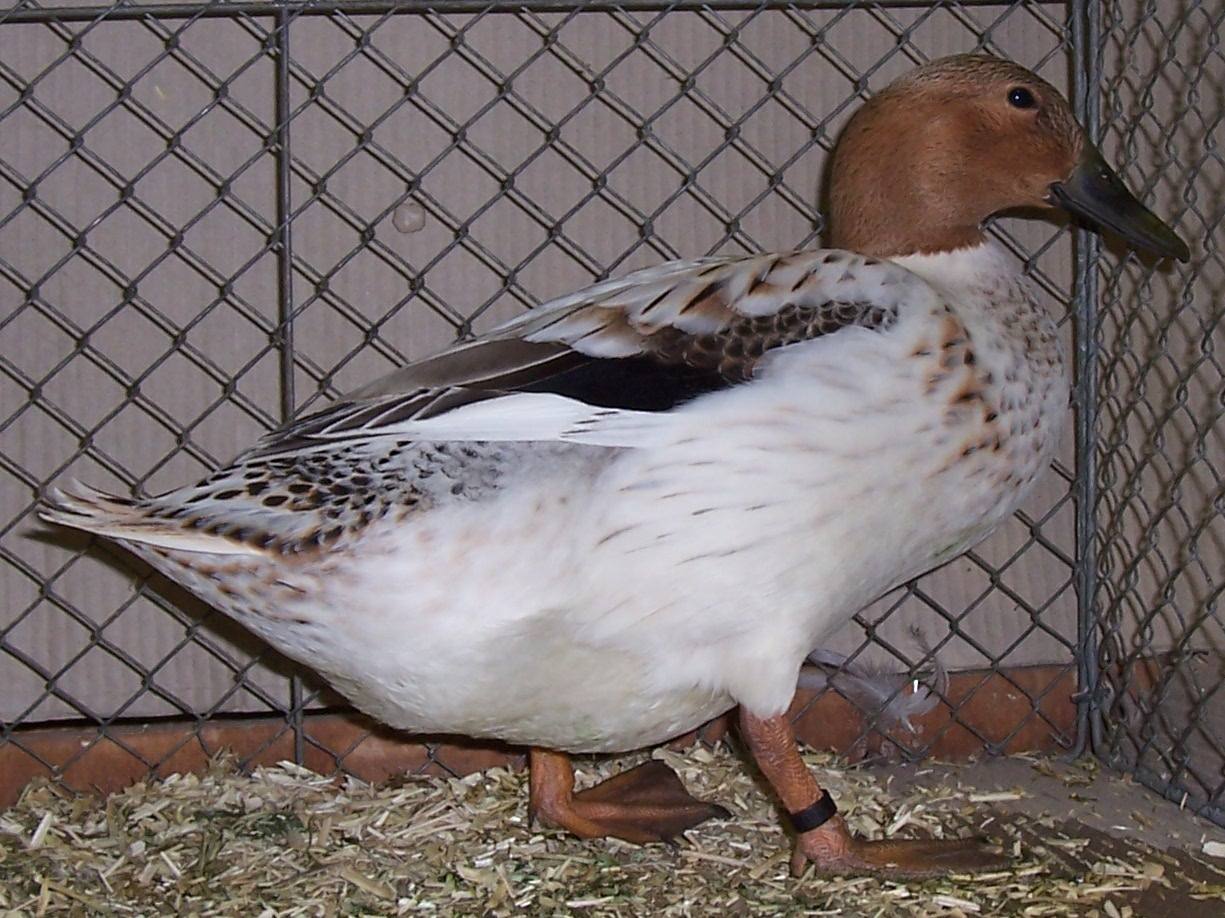
- A caged Abacot Ranger
- Conservation status: Critical (FAO, 2007)

Classification

The Abacot Ranger is a breed of domestic duck, initially known as the Hooded Ranger and as Streicherente ('Ranger Duck', in Germany). A utility breed, originally developed for eggs and meat, it is popular for exhibition and egg production today.

== Origin ==
The Abacot Ranger was developed between 1917 and 1922 by Mr. Oscar Gray of Abacot Duck Ranch, Friday Wood, Colchester in the United Kingdom, the name of the 'Ranch' being derived from Gray's home at Abbott's Cottages. Some white 'sports' occurred among his flock of Khaki Campbell's, and these Mr. Gray mated to white Indian Runner drakes and the progeny were named Hooded Rangers and entered at the Wye College egg-laying trials 1922–23, where they gave a good account of themselves with the highest score in their section. The name was changed to Abacot Ranger for the egg-laying trials at Bentley, and remained as such. It was initially a popular breed for egg and meat production, but soon became extinct in the United Kingdom. and the breed was then returned to the United Kingdom in the 1970s from Germany. The Abacot Ranger was accepted into the British Waterfowl Standard in 1983.

== Weight ==
The standard weight is 3 kg (6.6 lb) for a drake (or male) and 2.5 kg (5.5 lb) for a duck (or female).
