= List of Italian poultry breeds =

This is an incomplete list of breeds of poultry, other than chickens, considered in Italy to be wholly or partly of Italian origin. Some may have complex or obscure histories, so inclusion here does not necessarily imply that a breed is predominantly or exclusively Italian.

== Turkeys ==
- Bronzato comune
- Castano precoce
- Ermellinato
