= Appenzeller Barthuhn =

Swiss breed of chicken

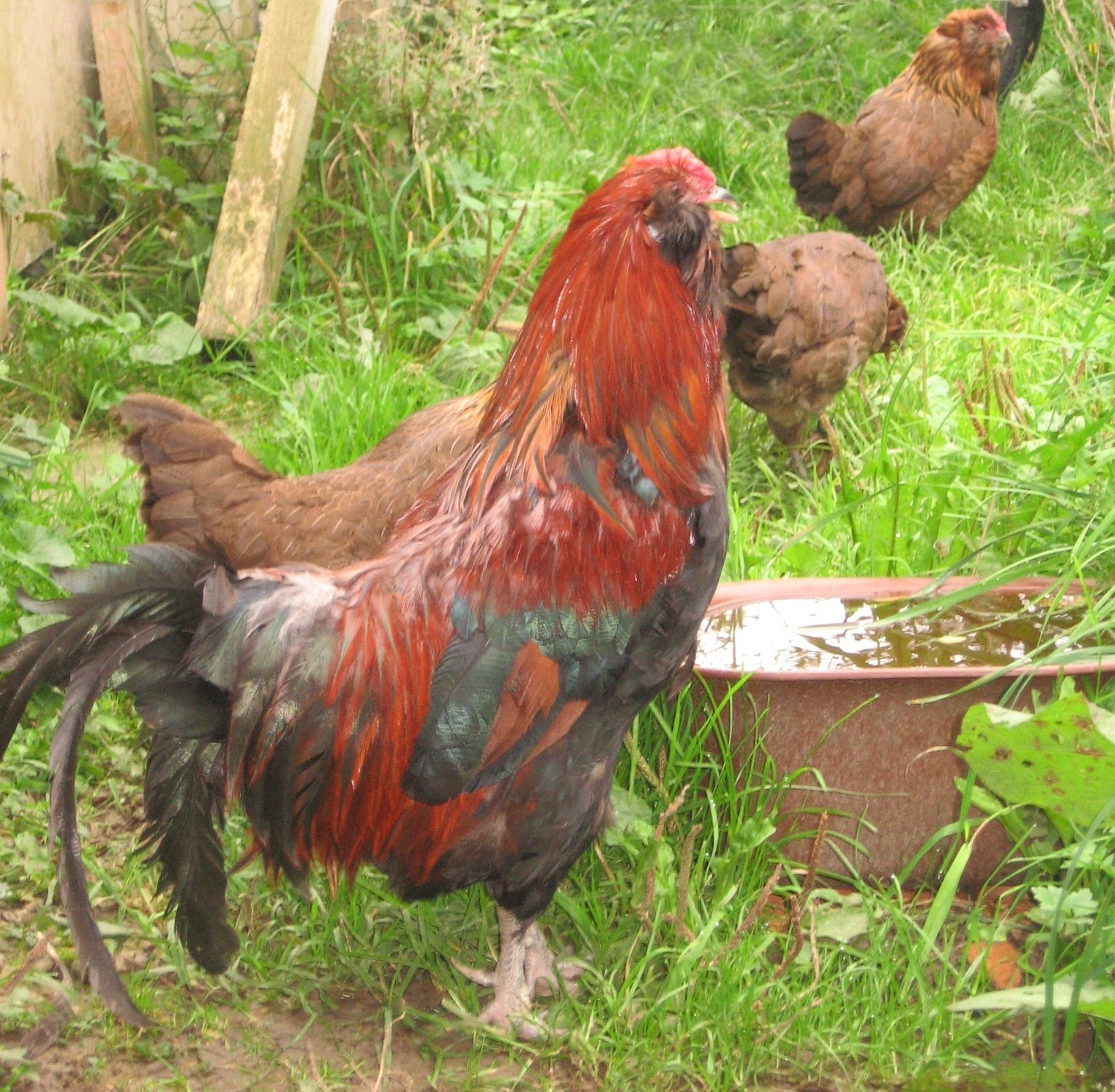
- Cock and hens
- Conservation status: SAVE Foundation (2003): critical; FAO (2007): not at risk; DAD-IS (2022): at risk
- Other names: Alemannic German: Bartli; French: Appenzelloise Barbue
- Country of origin: Switzerland
- Distribution: Switzerland; Austria; Germany
- Use: eggs

Classification
- APA: no
- EE: yes
- PCGB: soft feather light
- Chicken; Gallus gallus domesticus

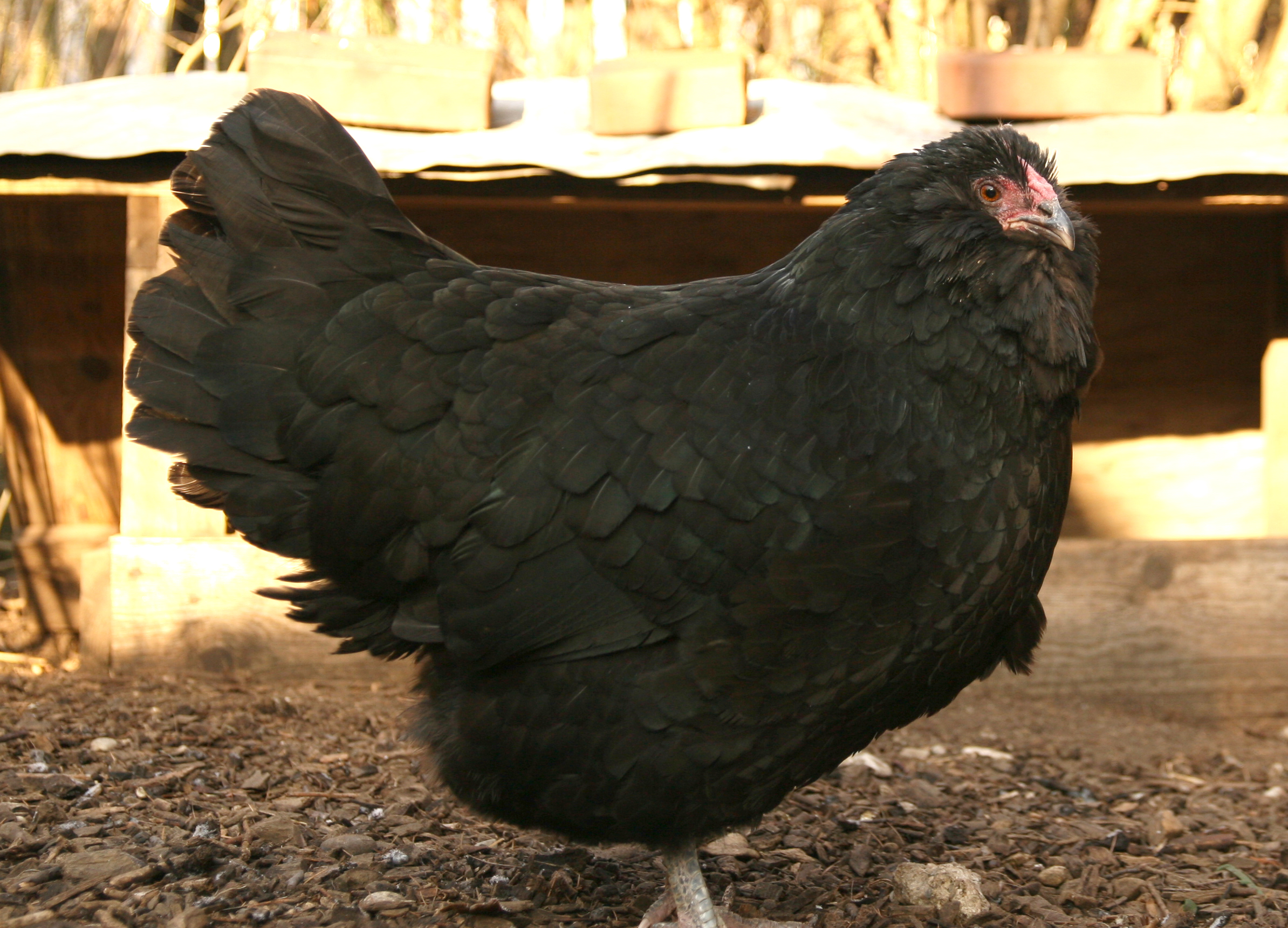
A hen of the black colour variant

The Appenzeller Barthuhn is a Swiss breed of bearded chicken originating in the historical Appenzell region of Switzerland. It is one of two chicken breeds from that area, the other being the Appenzeller Spitzhauben; the only other Swiss breed of chicken is the Schweizer.

== History ==
The Barthuhn was bred from about 1860 in the historical Appenzell region of Switzerland. It may derive, at least in part, from Italiener, Polverara and Russian Bearded stock. Much of the breeding was done by a man named Züst in the district of Vorderland in the Canton of Appenzell Ausserrhoden, who hoped that a bearded and rose-combed bird might have a better resistance to frost than other chickens. The breed was recognised in 1898.

A bantam version was bred in the 1990s by E. Meier of Bottenwil, in the Canton of Aargau.

A flock-book was started in 2005; in 2019 the recorded population consisted of 334 hens and 205 cocks.

== Characteristics ==
The Barthuhn is a light chicken: hens weigh some 1.6 to 1.8 kg, cock birds about 2.0 to 2.3 kg.

It is recognised by the Entente Européenne in three colours: partridge, black and blue-laced; other sources list only the first two colours. The Poultry Club of Great Britain allows any colour seen in any breed of game fowl.

Ring size is 18 mm for cocks and 16 mm for hens.

== Use ==
Hens may lay some 150 white-shelled eggs in their first year, with an average weight of about 55 g.
