= ProSpecieRara =

Swiss non-profit organization

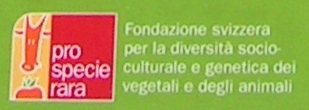
- Company type: Foundation
- Founded: 1982; 44 years ago
- Headquarters: Basel
- Area served: Switzerland
- Revenue: 4,300,000 euro (2020)
- Website: www.prospecierara.ch

ProSpecieRara, the "Schweizerische Stiftung für die kulturhistorische und genetische Vielfalt von Pflanzen und Tieren" ("Swiss foundation for the cultural and genetic diversity of plants and animals"), is a non-profit charitable organization dedicated to the preservation of the genetic diversity of plants and animals in Switzerland. It was founded in 1982 in St. Gallen and is headquartered in Basel.

== Aims and tasks ==
The main purpose of ProSpecieRara is to save endangered breeds of Swiss farm animals and traditional crops from extinction. ProSpecieRara encourages and supports the breeding and cultivation of traditional animals and crops, assists producers with their marketing, and preserves and disseminates knowledge about them. It also maintains or supports a network of 52 locations, such as botanical gardens or zoos, in which traditional animals and crops are made accessible to the public. ProSpecieRara is a network partner of the European SAVE Foundation.

== See also ==
- Agriculture in Switzerland
- Biodiversity Monitoring Switzerland, a programme for the long-term monitoring of species diversity
