= Old English Pheasant Fowl =

British breed of chicken

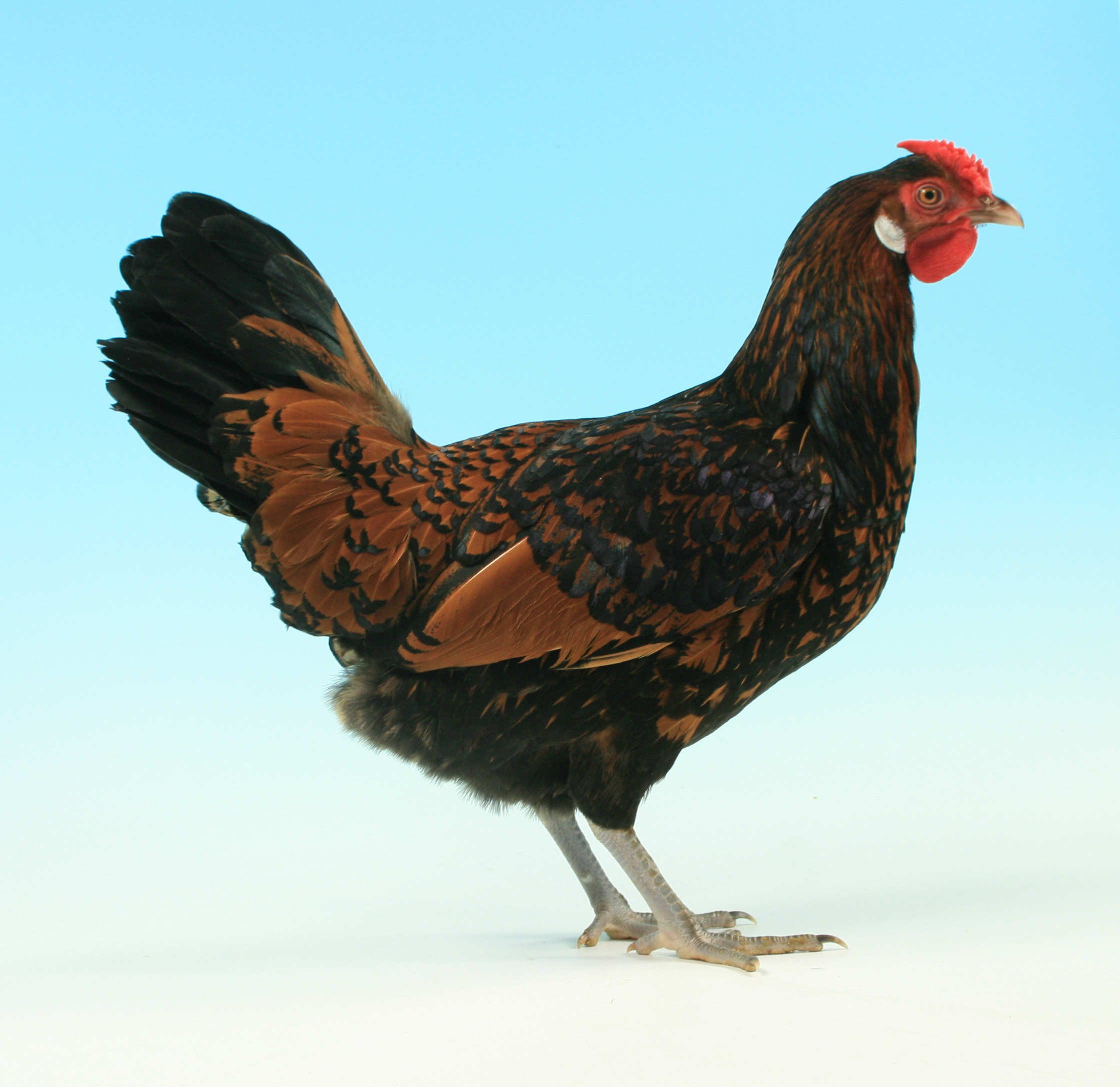
- Conservation status: FAO (2007): critical-maintained; RBST (2014): at risk
- Country of origin: United Kingdom

Traits
- Weight: Male: 2.7–3.2 kg; Female: 2.25–2.7 kg
- Egg colour: white

Classification
- EE: not recognised
- PCGB: rare soft feather: light
- Chicken; Gallus gallus domesticus

The Old English Pheasant Fowl is a British breed of small utility chicken. It derives from traditional breeds of rural Lancashire and Yorkshire and of the former counties of Cumberland and Westmorland. Its name is due to a perceived similarity of the plumage to that of the wild pheasant. It is a rare breed, and in 2014 was listed as "at risk" by the Rare Breeds Survival Trust.

== History ==
Mostly concentrated around Yorkshire and Lancashire, it was named and a breed club was formed in 1914. They are thought by some to be one of the precursors of the Hamburgh breed. In the twenty-first century, the Old English Pheasant Fowl is rare. It is listed as "at risk" in the 2014 watch list of the Rare Breeds Survival Trust.

== Characteristics ==
They have rose-type combs and white earlobes. Their plumage is a mahogany hue with darker lacing around the edges.

== Use ==
It is a hardy bird that does well in free range conditions as a table bird and a layer of white eggs.
