= Rouen duck =

Breed of domesticated duck

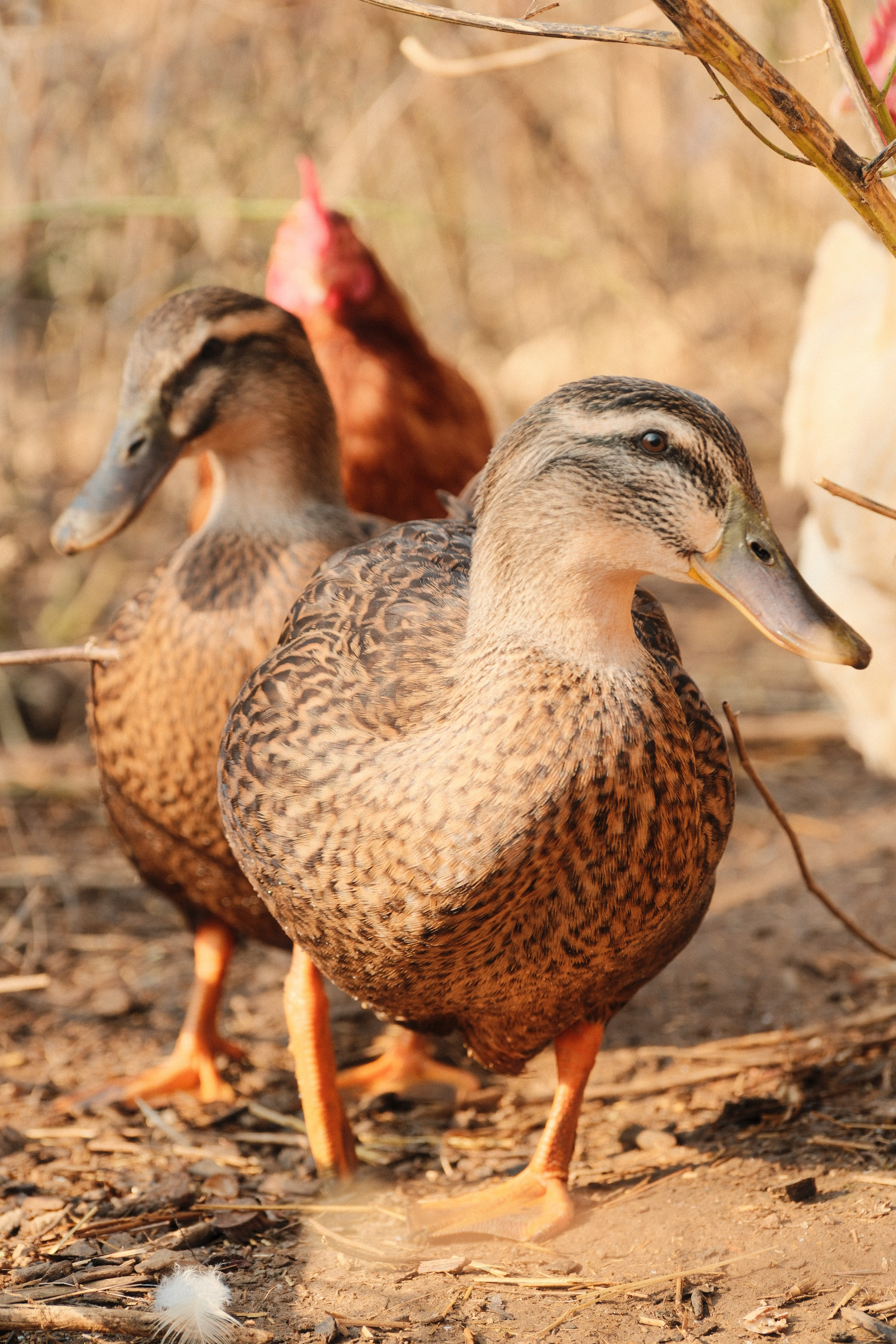
Rouen ducks

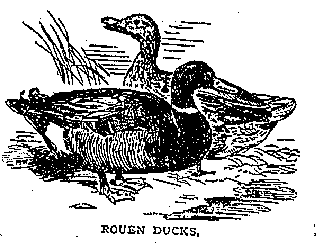
Rouen ducks featured in Mrs. Beeton's Book of Household Management in 1861

The Rouen is a heavyweight breed of domesticated duck. Rouens are raised primarily for meat, exhibition, or as general purpose ducks. Since they are not prolific egg layers, Rouen ducks are most commonly bred for their meat. The breed originated in France sometime before the 19th century.

== Description ==
The plumage coloring of both the Rouen drake and the Rouen duck are nearly identical to that of the Mallard drake and Mallard duck. The Rouen color pattern is referred to as gray. Males have dark yellow bills, green heads, white collars, black tail coverts and dark, ashy brown tail feathers, a dark gray upper back and light gray lower body, a deep claret breast, and bright orange legs and feet. The female Rouen hens are a consistent shade of mahogany brown, with a brown crown and tan eye-stripes extending from bill to the back of the eyes, and a brown bill. Another feature of the female color pattern is the distinct, detailed penciling found on feathers of the head, neck, body, most of the wing and tail. Rouen females can be much darker brown than Mallard females. Both sexes also have blue speculum feathers. However, Rouen speculum feathers are brighter in color and larger in size than that of the Mallard.

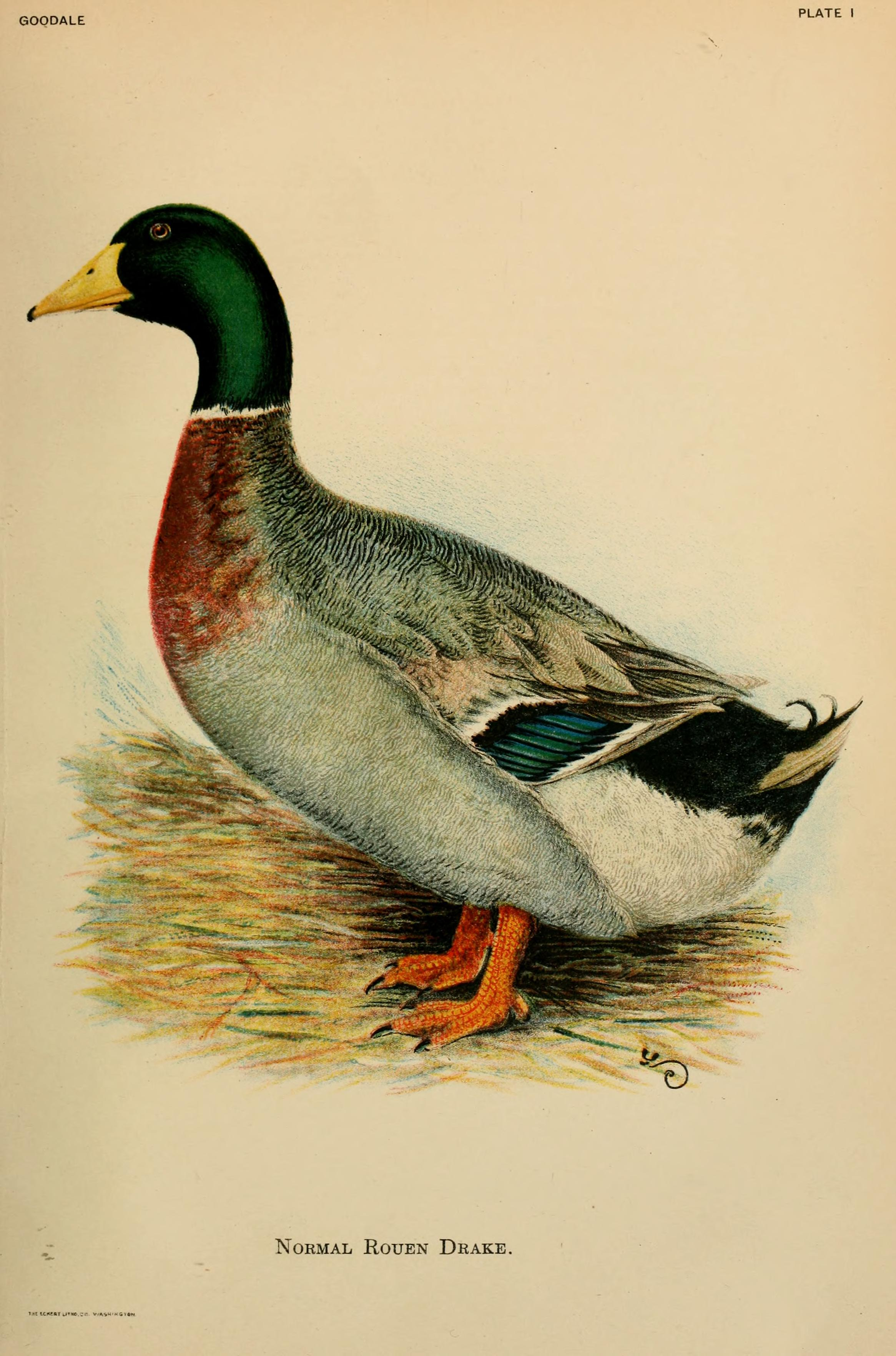
Rouen drake

Adult Rouen ducks are typically significantly larger than Mallard ducks; their bodies tend to be longer and heavier than the Mallard. In North America, two distinct types are bred: the common, or production-bred, variety that is larger than a Mallard but has a typical duck conformation, and the much larger and squarer standard-bred variety. The production variety normally weighs 6–8 lbs. (2.7–3.6 kg) while the standard-bred weighs 9–12 lbs. (4.1–5.4 kg). The production variety have a more upright carriage and slimmer body. The standard variety have a more horizontal carriage and a large, blocky body with the keel being deep and level.

The Rouen duckling is nearly identical to the Mallard duckling in terms of plumage coloring. Rouen ducklings can be distinguished from wild mallard ducklings by the presence of a second stripe which runs across their face, just under their eye, whereas mallard ducklings have only one stripe which runs across their eye.

These birds are of a docile and lethargic nature. Their larger bodies tend to inhibit the Rouen duck from sitting on a nest. Exhibition-typed Rouen ducks have been known to crush their eggs if allowed to set due to their massive frames. They mature slower than most other domestic duck breeds (6-8 months). They are often compared to the Pekin or Aylesbury breeds in both egg production and size. The Rouen is sometimes considered superior to these breeds, because they can be easily fattened, making them an excellent meat bird with delicate flesh.

A 5 month old drake

== History ==
The breed was first raised in France, but it was not until it reached England in the 19th century that it was refined into the breed recognized as the Rouen today. The French version resembled a larger than average Mallard, but by selective breeding, the British developed the exhibition-type Rouen. The final product was a bird with a deep, long keel, boat-shaped profile, enormous appearance, and refined markings, especially the penciling on the female. It was used chiefly as a roasting bird; though it produced 35 to 125 eggs a year, there were other breeds which were more reliable egg-layers with higher production. The eggs are typically white but can also be a blue-green color with thicker than normal shells. They average a weight of 3.5 oz. The French considered this domestic duck to represent the idea of "the Perfect Utility Duck." In 1861, Mrs. Beeton said of it:

The Rouen, or Rhone duck, is a large and handsome variety, of French extraction. The plumage of the Rouen duck is somewhat somber; its flesh is also much darker, and, though of higher flavor, not near so delicate as that of our own Aylesbury.

The origin of the name is highly debated. When they arrived in England, they were variously called the Rhône, after the region in southwest-central France, Rohan, after the cardinal of that name, Roan, for the mixture of colors, and Rouen after the northern French town, with Rouen eventually being adopted in both England and France. In France, they are called Rouen Foncé (dark) as opposed to Rouen Clair, which are lighter in color. These names arose from various English writers in the early part of the 19th century. B. Moubray was cited as calling it "the Rhone duck", yet Harrison Weir quotes "A Treatise on Poultry" (1810) naming them a "fine species that answers so well in the environs of Rouen, on the banks of the Seine." In 1875, J.K. Fowler, the leading authority on Rouens at the time, in "The Book of Poultry" declared:

The Rouen Duck, which is only second to the Aylesbury as a celebrity among our domestic waterfowl, most probably, as its name suggests, came originally from the city of Rouen, in Normandy; though some ingenious persons have tried to show that the name should be 'roan' and think that it was so called on account of its color, though why that particular color should be pitched upon from the many various ones its plumage contains it is hard to guess. It is far more probable that it is correctly called 'Rouen,' and that 'roan' is a corruption; for we know that quantities of poultry are raised in France, and Normandy is the most celebrated of the French provinces in this respect. We have however, no proof that the breed of ducks in question are especially the product of Rouen, though you may always see a large number of them, or at any rate, birds closely resembling them, for sale in the market place of that glorious old city.

In 1850, the first Rouens were introduced to the United States by D. W. Lincoln of Worcester, Massachusetts, and used as general farm ducks until becoming popular as show birds. They were included in the Standard of Perfection of the American Poultry Association in 1874 and since then have won many titles, often having the most entries in the heavyweight class and doing well in competition with other breeds. It was Mr. Lincoln who introduced the breed to the US, but John Giles was the poultryman instrumental in popularizing the breed among American poultry keepers. He had established his own Rouen flock by 1852, whether by buying Lincoln's own birds or importing his own. In 1854, he personally selected his own flock from England. After the Civil War, American Rouen ducks could be traced either directly to Giles' stock or indicated a strong probability of a relationship to it.

== See also ==
- List of duck breeds
