= Call duck =

Dutch breed of domestic duck

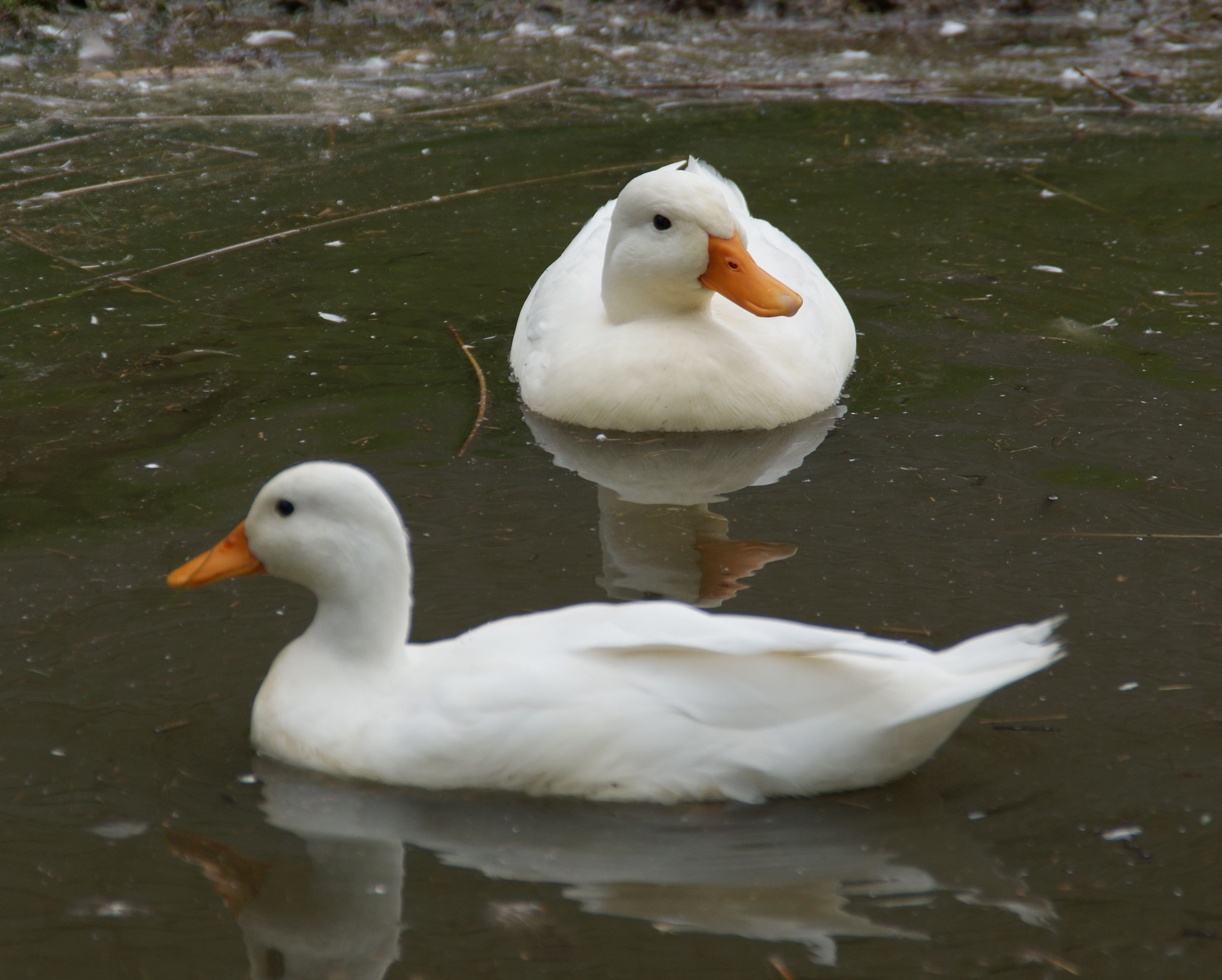
- Conservation status: FAO (2007): not at risk; DAD-IS (2022): at risk; SZH (2022): threatened
- Other names: Call Duck
- Country of origin: Netherlands
- Distribution: Ireland; Netherlands; United Kingdom
- Use: ornament; showing

Traits
- Weight: Male: 800–900 g; Female: 700–800 g
- Colour: about twenty recognised colours

Classification
- APA: bantam duck
- EE: yes
- PCGB: bantam and call ducks
- duck; Anas platyrhynchos domesticus

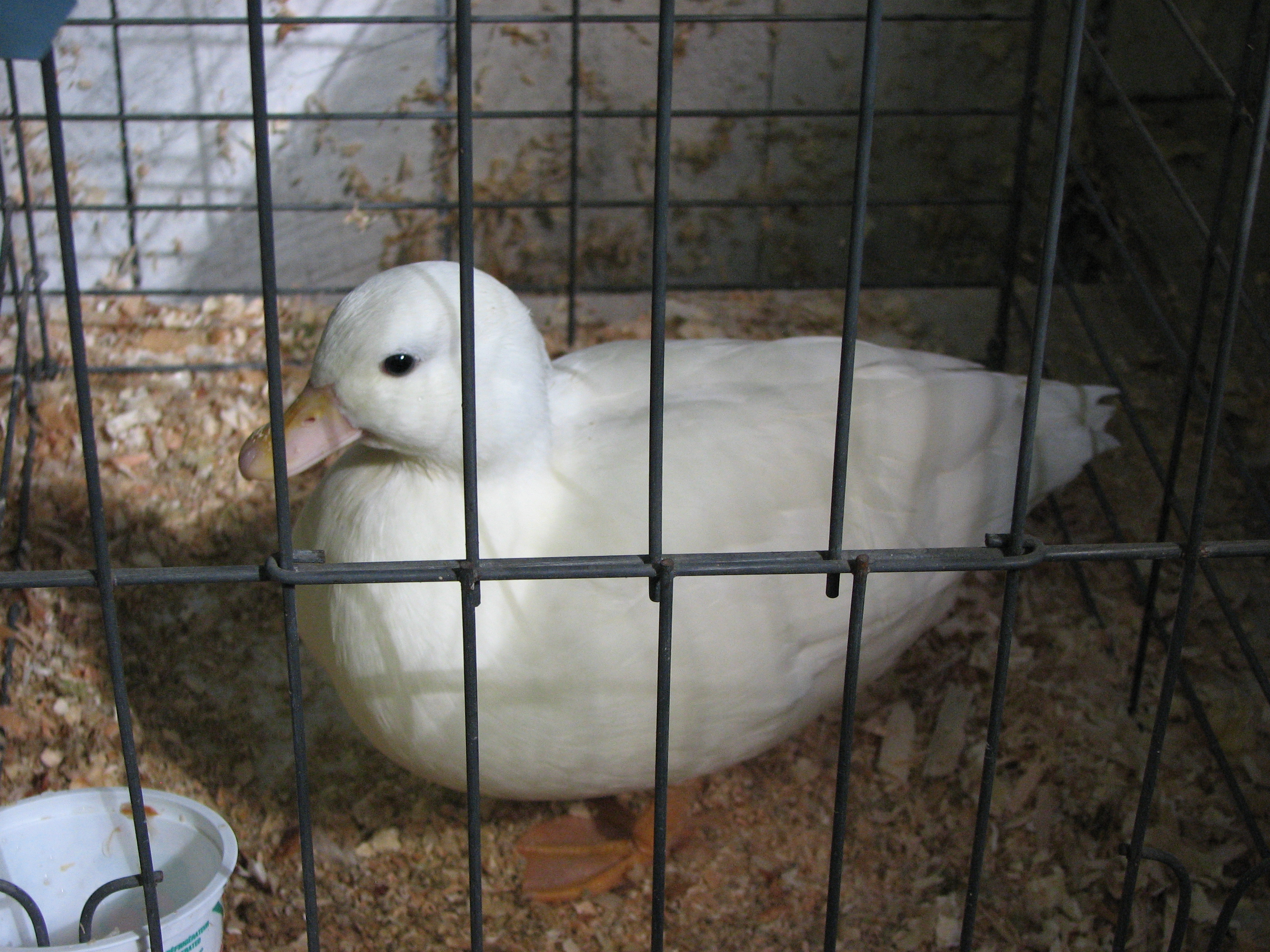
At a show

The Call is a historic Dutch breed of small domestic duck. It is believed to have originated in the Netherlands, where the earliest descriptions and depictions of it date from the seventeenth century. It is similar in appearance to some other breeds of duck, but is much smaller, with a round head and very short bill. Ducks – but not drakes – are very loquacious and noisy, with a piercing high-pitched call that can be heard from far away and from which the name derives.

The Call was in the past used as a decoy duck to attract wild ducks into traps.

== History ==
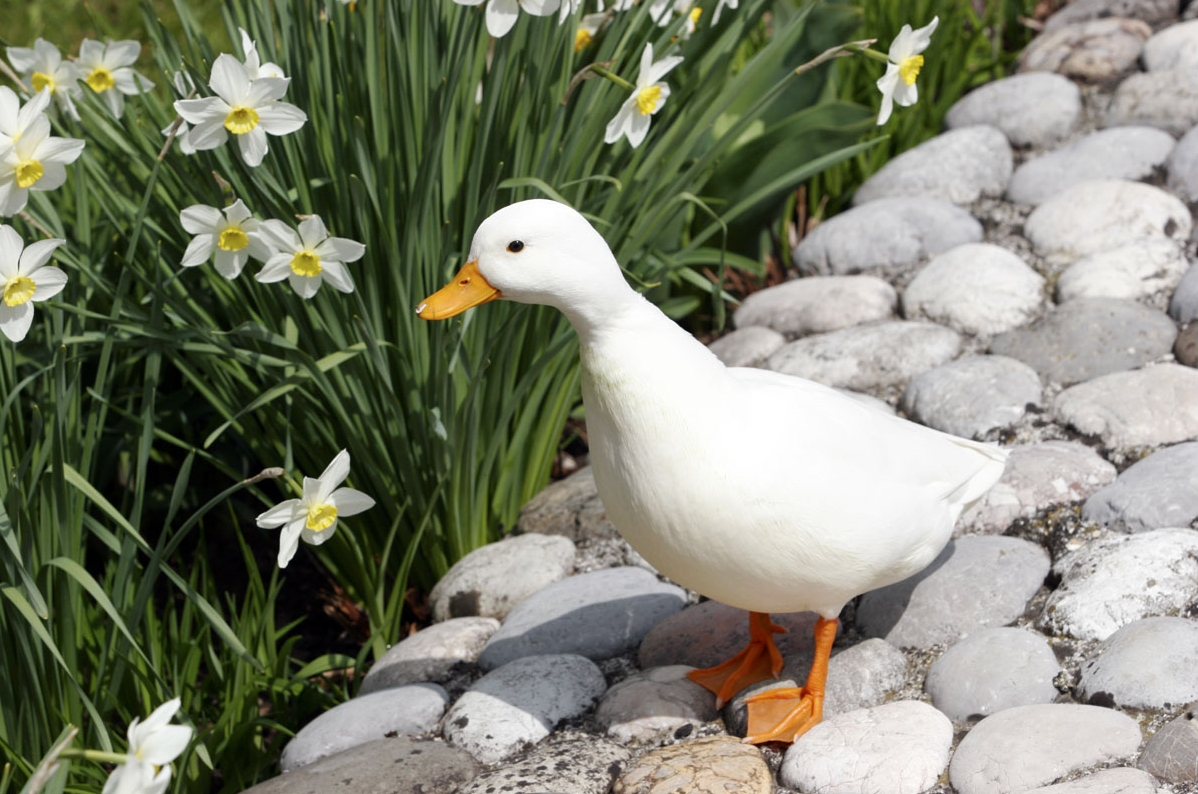
Adult drake

The use of decoy ducks to attract wild ducks into traps in the Dutch Republic is documented from the seventeenth century: the naturalist Francis Willughby, who travelled in Europe in the 1660s, describes the techniques as used in Holland; small ducks resembling the modern Call appear in the paintings of the animalier painter Melchior Hondecoeter from about the same period.

The Call was present in the British Isles by the mid-nineteenth century; an early description is that of James Joseph Nolan, published in Dublin in 1850. It was among the four breeds of duck included in the first poultry standard – the Standard of Excellence of William Bernhardt Tegetmeier – in 1865.

In the twenty-first century it is an endangered breed. In 2017 the Stichting Zeldzame Huisdierrassen classified it as bedreigd ('endangered'), based on a population of 750 ducks and 400 drakes in the hands of about 100 breeders. In 2026 its conservation status was listed in DAD-IS as "at risk/endangered".

== Characteristics ==
The Call is small, with an average weight of approximately 800 g; drakes may weigh up to 100 g more, and ducks up to 100 g less.

In the Netherlands about twenty colours are recognised; about the same number are recognised by the British Waterfowl Association and the Poultry Club of Great Britain in the United Kingdom. (Note: These include: abacot, Appleyard, apricot, apricot Appleyard (butterscotch), apricot silver, bibbed, black, blue fawn, blue silver, chocolate, chocolate mallard, chocolate silver, dark silver, dusky mallard, khaki (dusky chocolate mallard), magpie, mallard, pied, silver, white and yellow belly.) The Entente Européenne recognises nineteen colours, and lists a further eleven unrecognised ones. In the United States the grey and white varieties were included in the first Standard of Perfection of the American Poultry Association in 1874; six other colours were added between 1977 and 2007.

=== Australian Call Duck ===
In the second edition of the Australian Poultry Standards, published in 2011, the Australian Call Duck is described as a separate breed from the Call Duck of Europe, with a different range of plumage colours and a rather larger body size. It has been suggested that it developed independently in South Australia as a dwarf mutation in the domestic mallard.
