= Khaki Campbell =

Breed of duck

Campbell
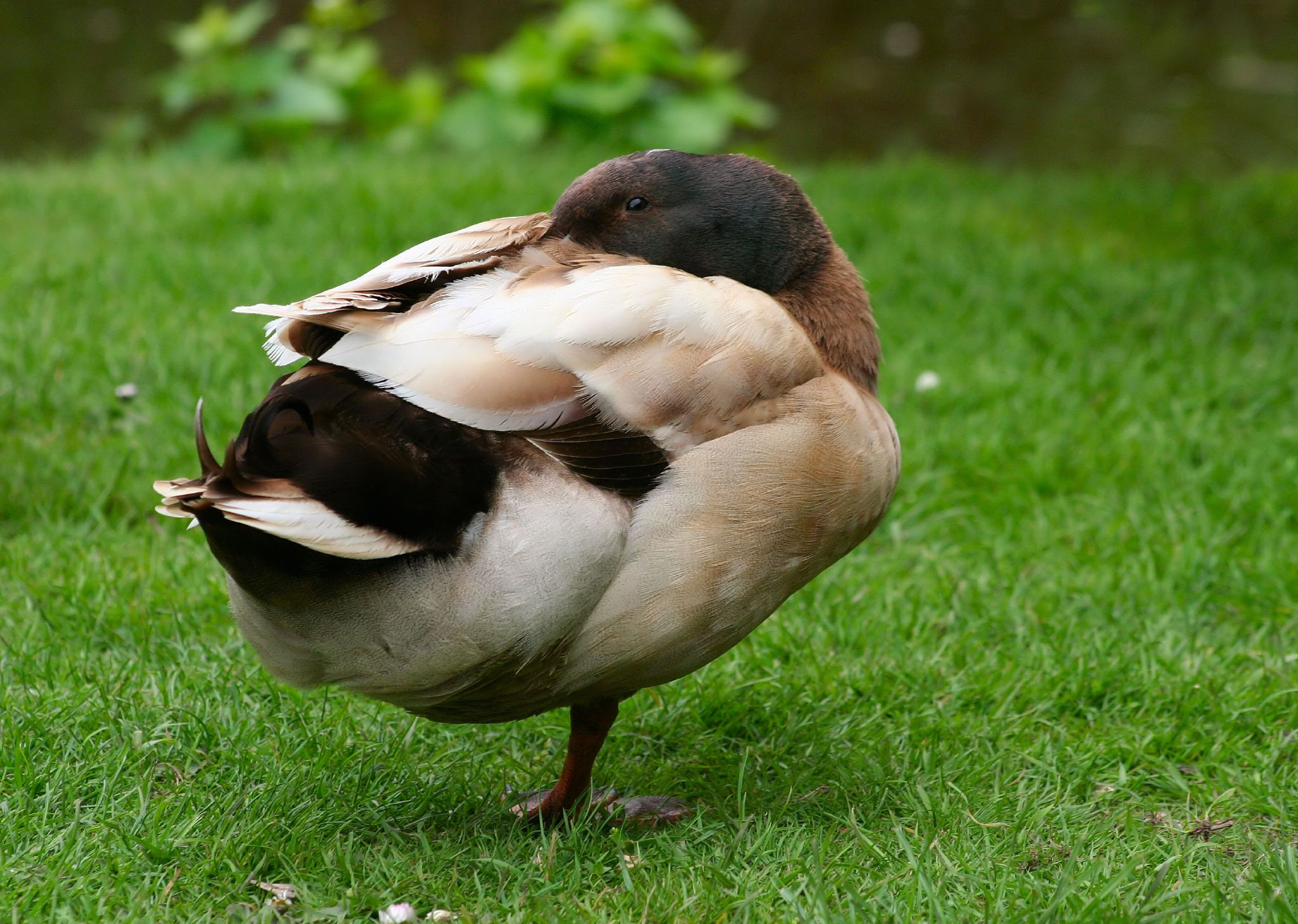
- Khaki drake perched on one leg
- Conservation status: FAO (2007): not at risk
- Other names: Khaki Campbell
- Country of origin: United Kingdom
- Use: eggs

Traits
- Weight: Male: 2.3–2.5 kg; Female: 2.0–2.3 kg
- Egg colour: white

Classification
- APA: Khaki only
- PCGB: yes

The Campbell is a British breed of domestic duck. It was developed at Uley, in Gloucestershire, England, at the turn of the 20th century; being introduced to the public in 1898 and the Khaki variety in 1901.

== History ==
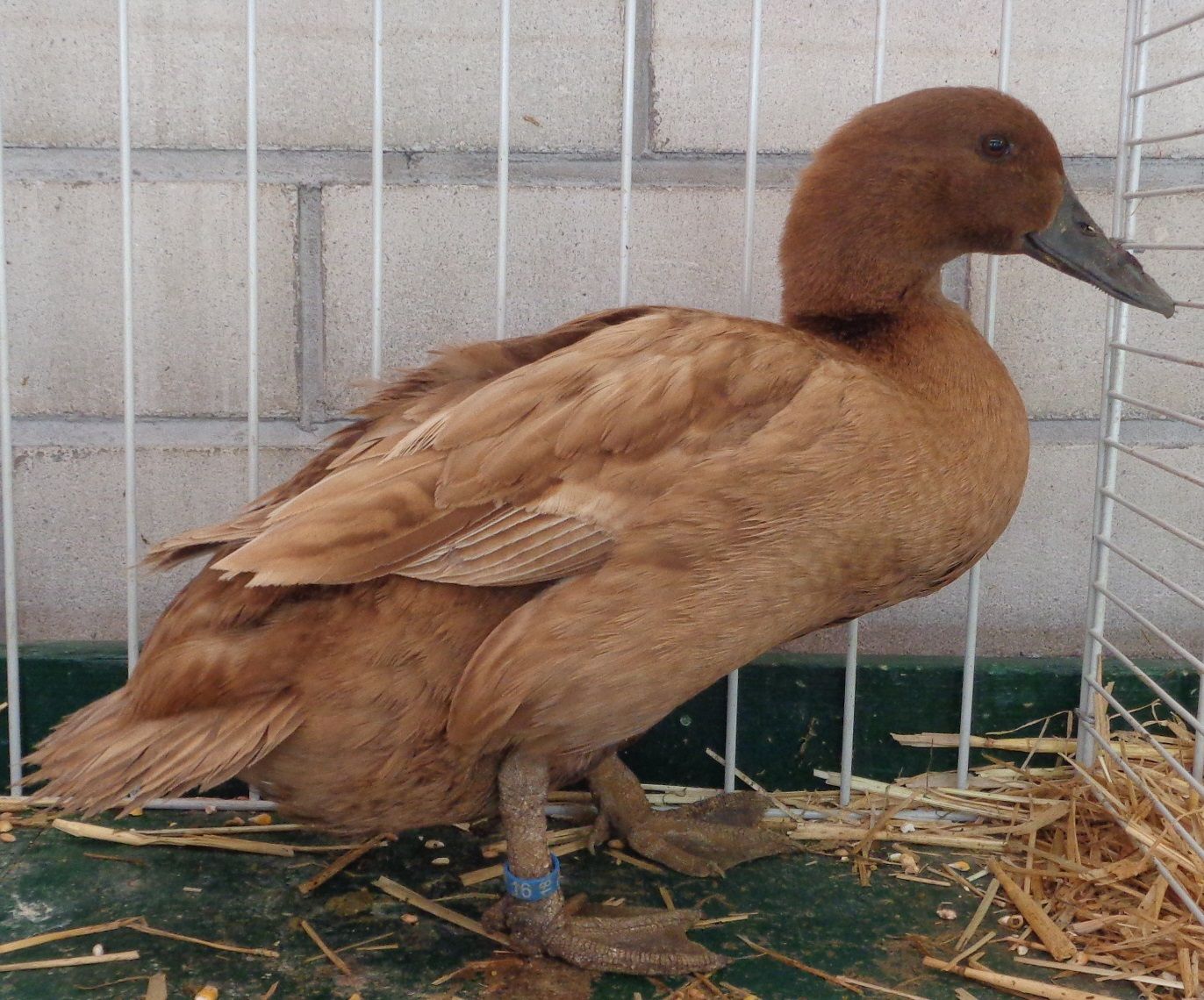
A Khaki duck

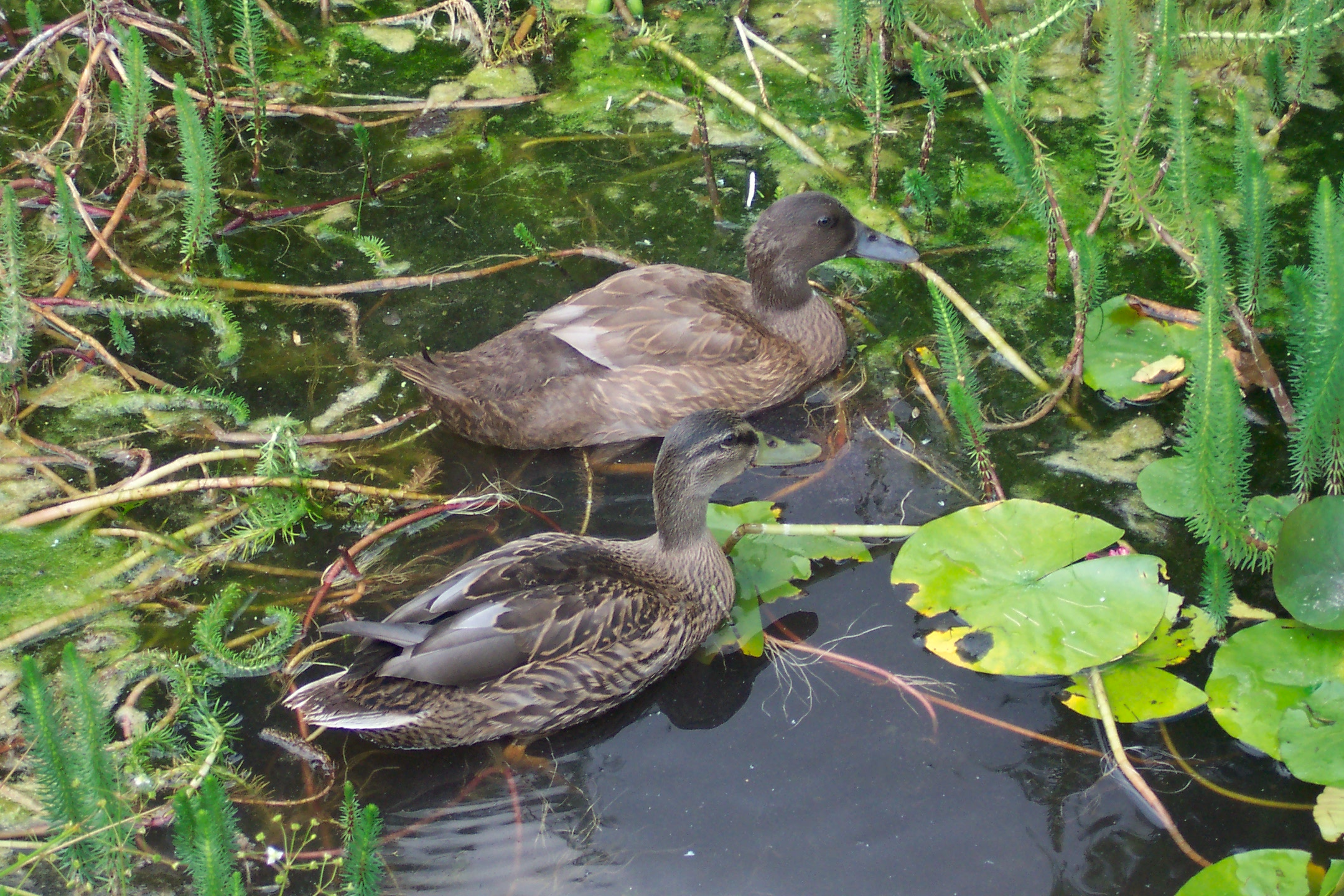
An 8 week old Khaki Campbell (rear) and a 13-week-old Mallard

Mrs Adele Campbell commenced poultry-keeping around 1887 and later purchased an Indian Runner Duck of indiscriminate type which was an exceptional layer (182 eggs in 196 days), and which formed the basis in developing the "Campbell Ducks"; in her own words "Various matings of Rouen, Indian Runner and Wild Duck were resorted to produce them". The resulting birds were prolific layers. The "Campbell" breed was introduced to the public in 1898. In an attempt to create a more attractive buff-coloured duck Mrs. Campbell resorted to further cross-matings. The resulting progeny, introduced to the Public in January 1901, is alleged to have reminded Mrs. Campbell of British army uniforms, hence naming this new colour-form "Khaki Campbell Duck".

The Khaki Campbell Duck Club was formed and in 1923, Mrs. Campbell's husband, Dr. Arthur Campbell was elected president. The following year, 1924, the Khaki Campbell Duck was accepted to the Standards of the Poultry Club, UK.

In 1941 Khaki Campbell Ducks were introduced to the American Standard of Perfection.

This breed of duck is listed as 'Watch' by the American Livestock Breeds Conservancy.

== Characteristics ==
Campbells can come in three colour varieties: khaki, dark and white. They were developed by crossing between Mallard, Rouen and Runner ducks. The Khaki Campbell drake is mostly khaki-coloured with a darker head usually olive green lacking the white ring of its Mallard ancestors. The Khaki Campbell duck has a more modest plumage of Khaki covering the entirety of the body.

== Use ==
The egg production of the Campbell breed can exceed even the most efficient of egg-laying domestic chickens, with the breed laying an average of 300 eggs a year. When provided a moderate "duck conscious" environment to live in they will lay a more than modest number of eggs per week.

Campbells become mature at approximately 7 months. Campbell ducks seldom hatch out others' young; however, in very communal situations do hatch large broods together. Most brooding instinct has been selectively bred against in exchange for prolific egg laying ability in this breed. The ducks, when raised by hand, are not usually defensive of their eggs or nests, making collection of eggs very easy. Mechanical incubators or broody chickens are used to hatch out Campbell ducklings when ducks are not present in the process. Incubation takes approximately 23 to 28 days for a Campbell duckling to hatch and eggs need to be inspected for ducklings that have not emerged from their egg completely.
