= Barnevelder =

Dutch breed of chicken

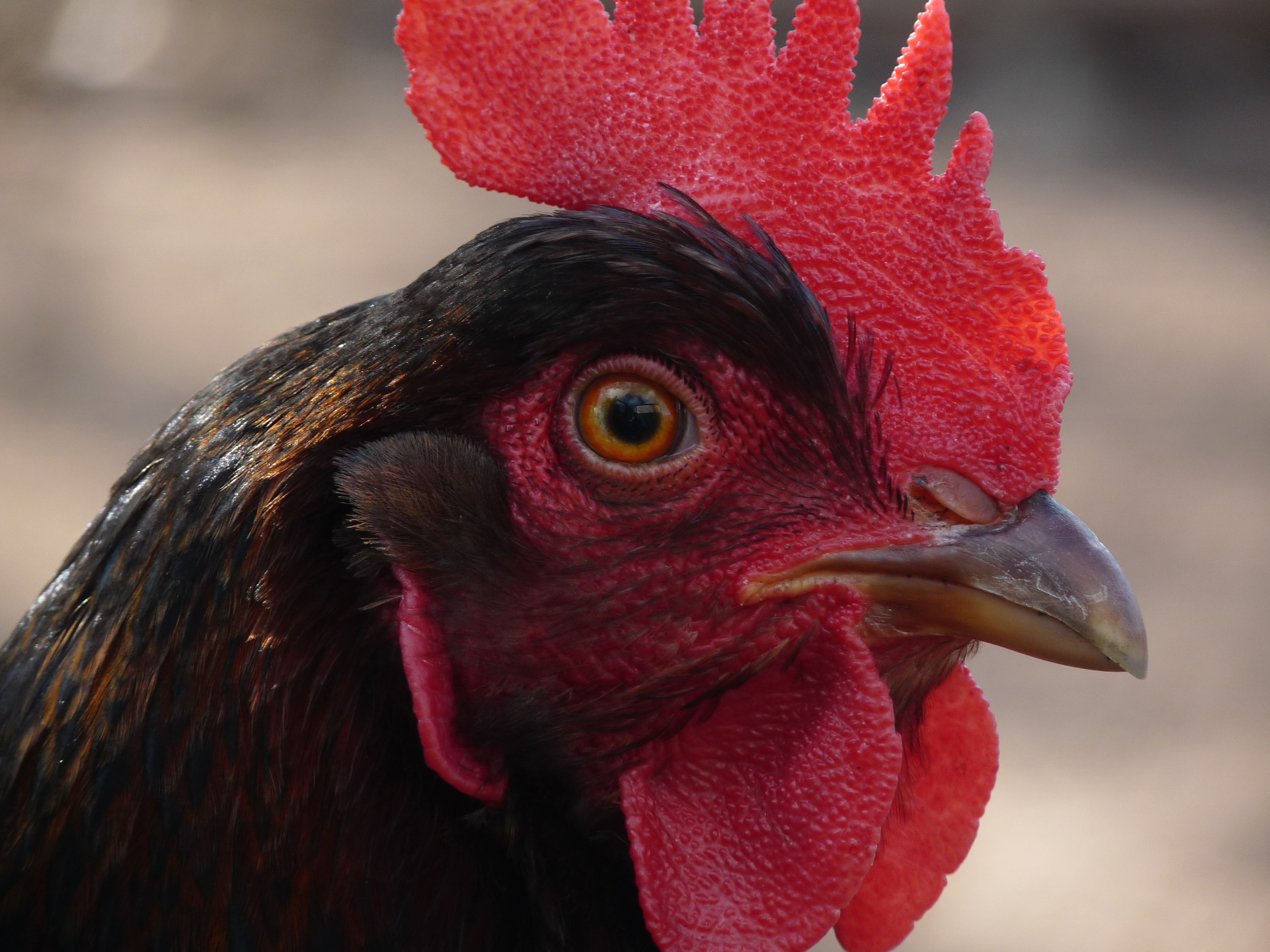
- Country of origin: The Netherlands

Traits
- Weight: Male: Standard: 3–3.5 kg; Bantam: 1000–1200 g; Female: Standard: 2.5–2.75 kg; Bantam: 900–1000 g
- Egg colour: brown

Classification
- APA: continental
- EE: yes
- PCGB: soft feather: heavy
- Chicken; Gallus gallus domesticus

The Barnevelder is a Dutch breed of domestic chicken. It resulted from cross-breeding between local Dutch chickens and various "Shanghai" birds imported from Asia to Europe in the later part of the nineteenth century; these may have been of Brahma, Cochin or Croad Langshan type. It is named for the town and gemeente (municipality) of Barneveld, in Gelderland in the central Netherlands. The hens are good layers of large brown eggs and, unlike some other breeds, continue to lay well during winter.

== History ==
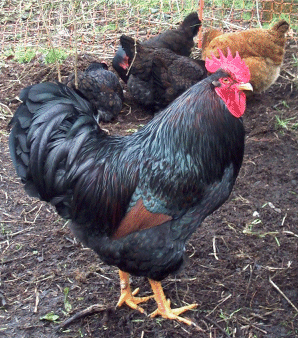
Double-laced cock

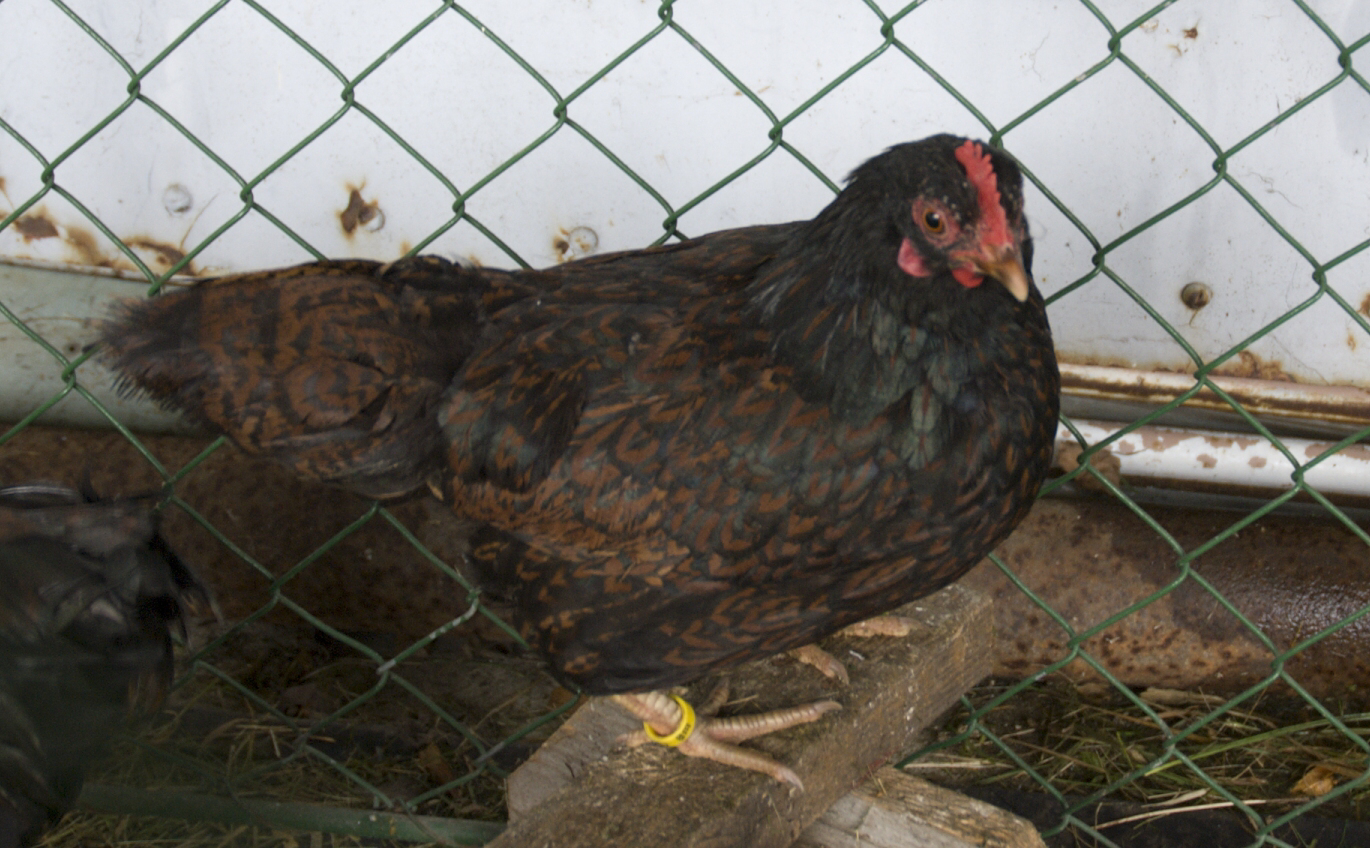
Bantam hen

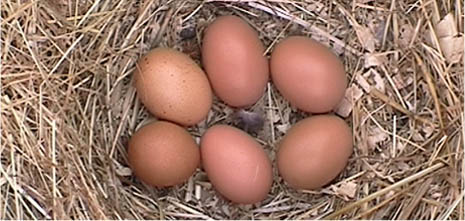
Eggs

In the 1850s Asian chickens began to arrive in Europe, where they were at first known as "Shanghai" chickens. These were initially cross-bred among themselves, and only later developed into breeds such as the Brahma, the Cochin and the Croad Langshan. From about 1865, some of these Shanghai chickens were cross-bred with local farmyard chickens in the area of Barneveld. Towards the end of the nineteenth century there may also have been some breeding with a type called Amerikaanse Nuthoenders ("American utility birds"), which showed some similarity to the American Wyandotte; it is not known what these birds were, or if they were really American. In about 1906 there may also have been some cross-breeding with British Buff Orpington stock. According to Hans Schippers, the greatest influence on the characteristics of the Barnevelder was from the Langshan, which contributed hardiness, brown eggs, and good winter production.

The name Barnevelder was first used for birds shown at the Landbouwtentoonstelling or agricultural exhibition held in The Hague in 1911. From about this time attempts were made to breed for consistent type and colour. However, when the Dutch Poultry Club discussed whether to accept the Barnevelder as a new breed in 1919, it was found to be too variable. In 1921 a breeders' association was formed, and the first standard was drawn up. The breed was recognised in 1923.

From about 1921 the Barnevelder was exported to the United Kingdom, where brown eggs were in demand. The birds were at first very variable, with single-laced, double-laced or – mostly – partridge plumage. Partridge and double-laced varieties were included in the British Poultry Standard; the double-laced became the principal variety. There may have been some cross-breeding with Indian Game stock. The partridge variety was added to the Standard of Perfection of the American Poultry Association in 1991.

== Characteristics ==
Four colour varieties are recognised by the Barnevelderclub of the Netherlands in both large fowl and bantams: double-laced, double-laced blue, black and white. The silver double-laced variety was recognised – in the bantam only – in 2009, and the silver-black double-laced was recognised in 2014; other varieties are in development. The Entente Européenne recognises two further colours in large fowl – blue and partridge; for bantams it recognises crele and partridge in addition to those recognised in Holland, and lists the blue. In the United Kingdom the four varieties recognised are the double-laced blue, double-laced brown, double-laced silver and black.

== Use ==
A Barnevelder hen lays some 175–200 brown eggs per year, with a weight of about 60–65 g.
