= Modern Game =

British breed of ornamental chicken

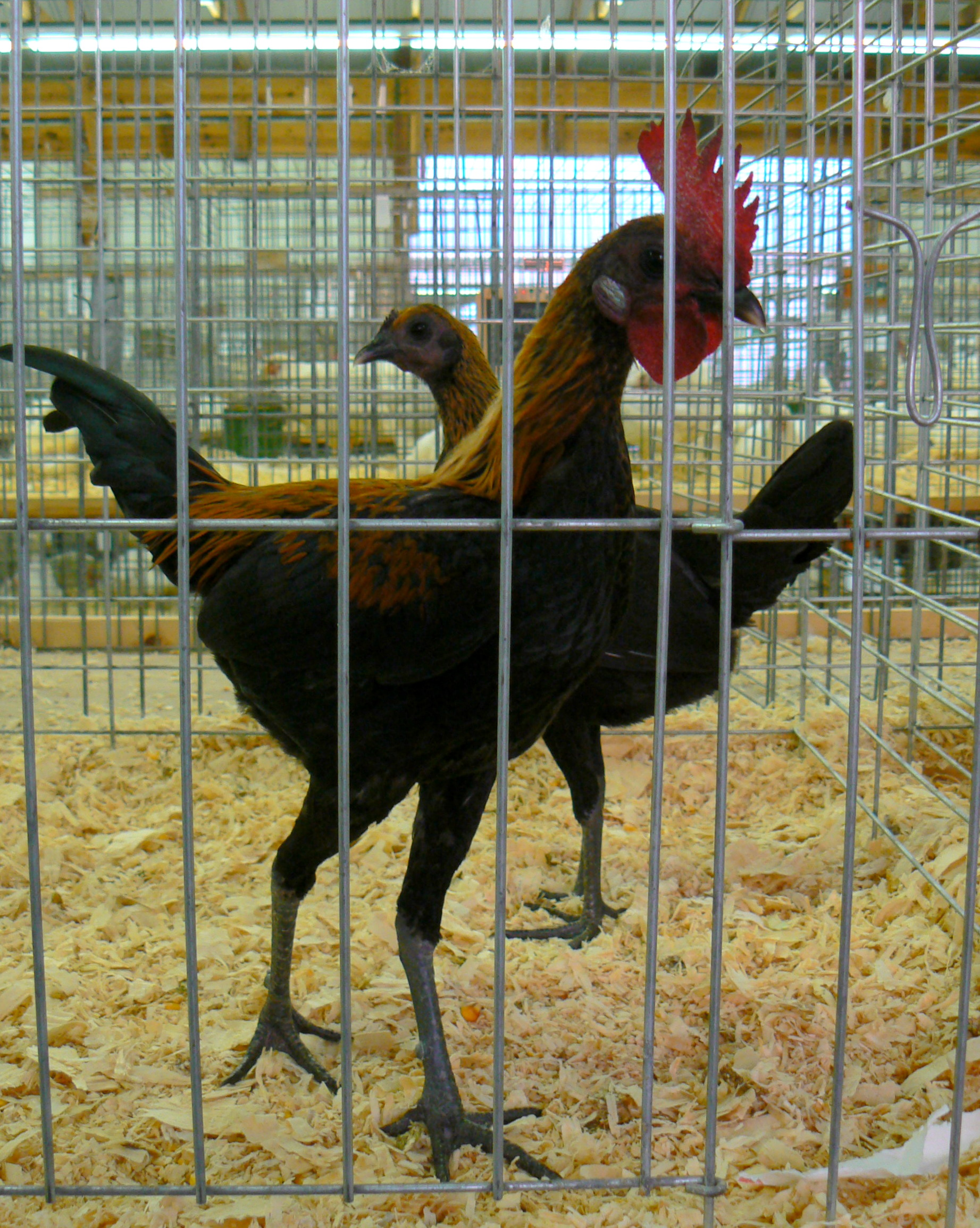
- A brown-red pair
- Conservation status: FAO (2007): not at risk; RBST (2024): priority; Livestock Conservancy (2024): threatened
- Country of origin: United Kingdom

Traits
- Weight: Male: Standard: 3.20–4.10 kg; Bantam: 570–620 g; Female: Standard: 2.25–3.20 kg Bantam: 450–510 g

Classification
- APA: all other standard breeds
- EE: yes
- PCGB: hard feather
- Chicken; Gallus gallus domesticus

The Modern Game is a British breed of ornamental chicken which originated in England between 1850 and 1900. It was bred from gamecock stock, but solely as an exhibition bird.

== History ==
Cockfighting was made illegal in Britain in 1849; in the following decades, some breeders cross-bred fighting birds of Old English Game and Malay stock to develop an ornamental bird for exhibition.

This was initially known as the Game, and in 1865 was included in nine colours in the Standard of Excellence in Exhibition Poultry, the first edition of the British Poultry Standard by William Bernhardt Tegetmeier; a Game bantam was also listed. From about 1870 it was known as the Exhibition Game or Exhibition Modern Game. Eight colours were included in the first edition of the Standard of Perfection of the American Poultry Association in 1874.

== Characteristics ==
The Modern Game is tall and upright, with a long neck and long legs. The body is broad at the breast and tapers towards the tail, somewhat like a clothes iron in shape; the back is short and flat. Thirteen colours are recognised by the Poultry Club of Great Britain: birchen, black, black-red, blue, blue-red, brown-red, gold duckwing, lemon-blue, pile, silver-blue, silver duckwing, wheaten and white. The colour of the beak and legs varies according to that of the plumage, from black in the birchen through willow-green in the duckwings and the black-red to yellow in the pile and white. The comb is single and small; the face, comb and wattles vary from black though deep purple to a bright red, and the eyes also vary from black to bright red.

Standard-sized cocks weigh 3.20–4.10 kg and hens 2.25–3.20 kg, while bantams weigh 570–620 g and 450–510 g respectively.

== Use ==
The Modern Game does not lay well, nor is it valued for meat production. It is kept almost exclusively for showing, particularly in the bantam size.

== Gallery ==
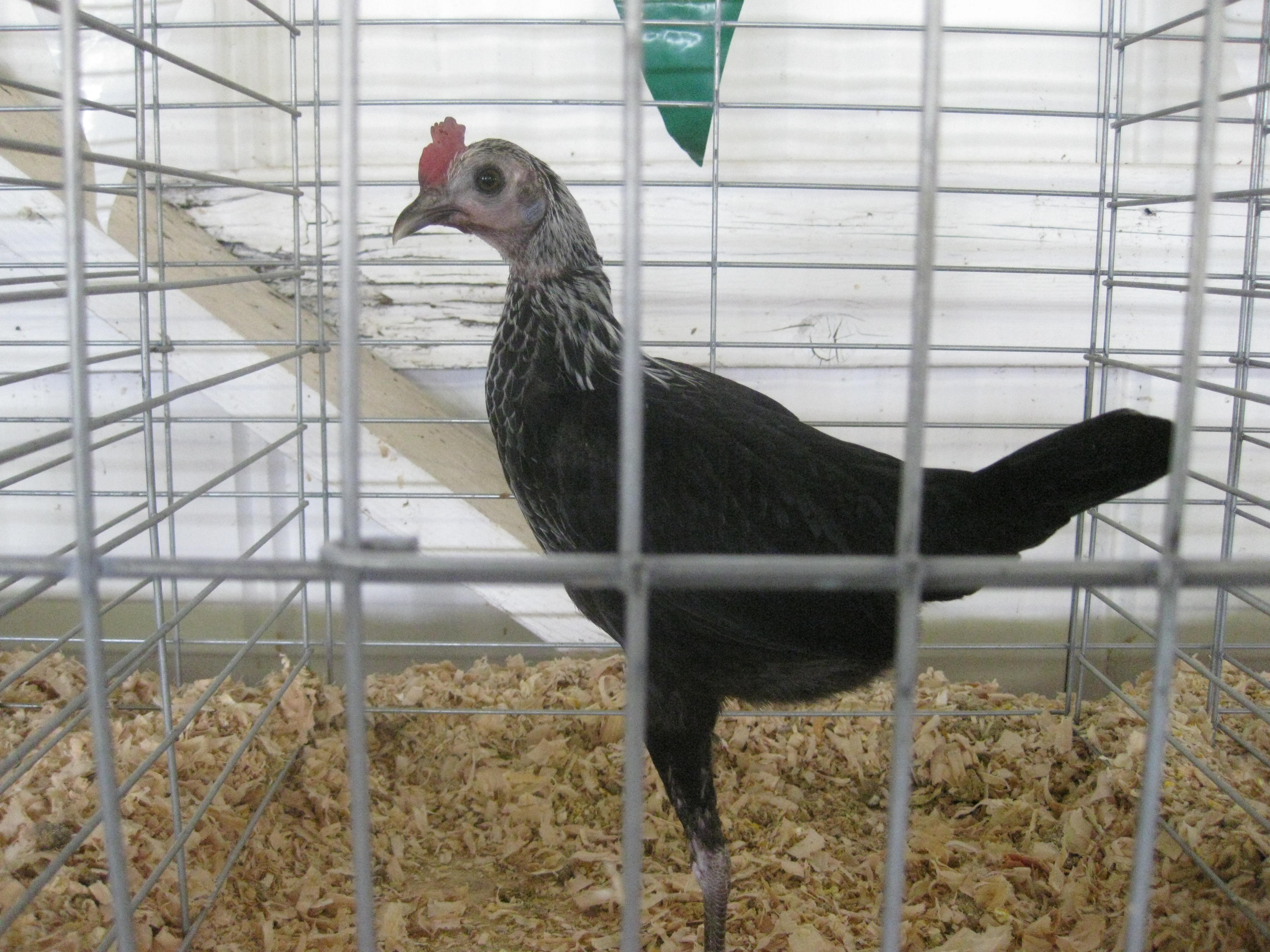
A birchen hen in the United States

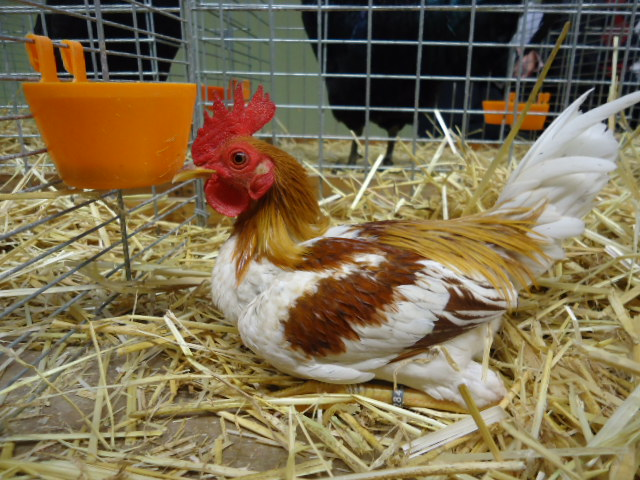
A red pyle cockerel

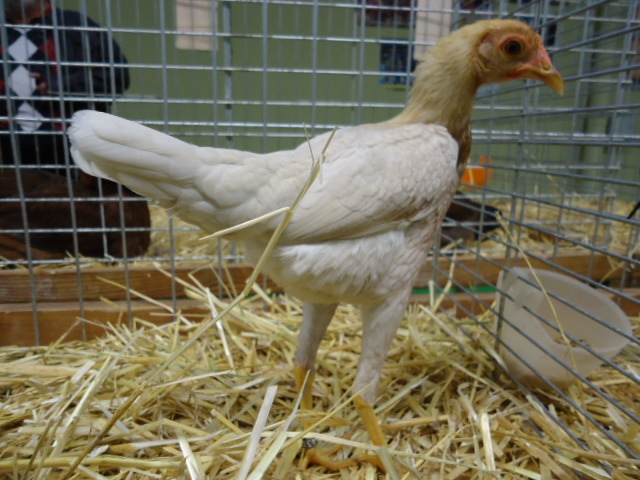
A red pyle hen

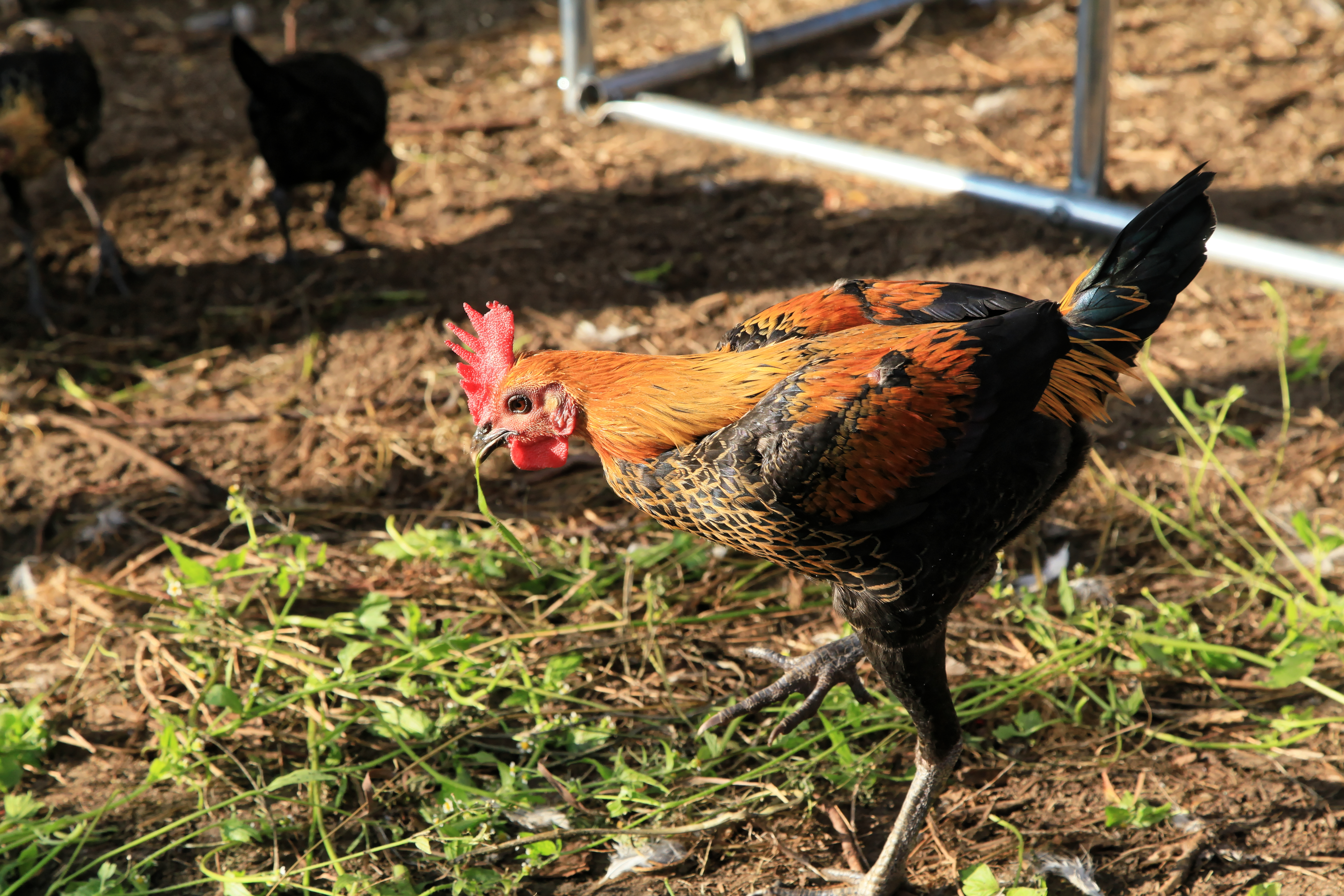
Another rooster
