= Nankin Bantam =

British breed of chicken

- Conservation status: FAO (2007): critical; RBST (2026): priority; RPS (2026): rare
- Country of origin: United Kingdom
- Use: ornamental

Traits
- Weight: Male: 680–740 g; Female: 570–620 g
- Egg colour: tinted
- Comb type: single or rose

Classification
- APA: single comb clean legged
- EE: no
- PCGB: rare true bantam
- Chicken; Gallus gallus domesticus

The Nankin Bantam or Nankin is a British breed of bantam chicken. It is a true bantam, a naturally small breed with no large counterpart from which it was miniaturised. It is of South-east Asian origin, and is among the first bantam breeds brought to the United Kingdom. It is a yellowish buff colour, and the name is thought to derive from the colour of nankeen cotton from China.

== History ==
The Nankin is thought to have originated in India and Indonesia, and to have been one of the first true bantams to be brought to the United Kingdom. It became widespread in the eighteenth century, and was at first known as the Yellow or Common Yellow bantam.

The Yellow or Nankin was described in some detail by Edmund Saul Dixon in his Ornamental and Domestic Poultry in 1848, by William Wingfield and George William Johnson in The Poultry Book in 1853, and by "Martin Doyle" (William Hickey) in The Illustrated Book of Domestic Poultry in 1854. It was not included in the first poultry standard, The Standard of Excellence in Exhibition Poultry by William Bernhard Tegetmeier, but was mentioned in his The Poultry Book of 1873. A more complete description was given by William Flamank Entwisle in his Bantams, published posthumously in 1894.

The Nankin is believed to have contributed to the development of several other bantam breeds, possibly including the Sebright developed in the early nineteenth century by Sir John Sebright.

In the United States it is recognised by the American Bantam Association, and was added to the Standard of Perfection of the American Poultry Association in 2012. A breed society was formed in 2006.

In 2002 the total number for the breed was estimated at 50–100 birds; its conservation status was listed by the Food and Agriculture Organization of the United Nations as 'critical' in 2007. In 2026 it was listed as 'priority' by the Rare Breeds Survival Trust and as 'rare' by the Rare Poultry Society in the United Kingdom, and as 'threatened' by the Livestock Conservancy in the United States; it was reported to DAD-IS by Ireland, the United Kingdom and the United States, but no recent population data was reported and its conservation status was listed as 'unknown' for each of the three.

== Characteristics ==
It is a small bantam, with body weights of 570 to 620 g for hens and 680 to 740 g for cocks. Only one colour is recognised, the buff: hens are a uniform dark ginger-buff colour, tinged with black at the tip of the tail and plaer on the underparts; cocks are darker, with orange on the neck, the back and the saddle feathers. black tail feathers and copper- or bronze-coloured side hangers and sickles darkening to black at the tips. The beak is horn-coloured or white, the shanks are blue-white or blue, sometimes with a stripe of pinkish colour on the outside in cock birds. The face, comb, ear-lobes and wattles are a vivid red, the eyes are orange.

The comb may be either single or rose; the single is vertical and has between three and six points; the rose is small and close to the head, with a fine upward-curving leader.

== Use ==
The Nankin is usually reared for fancy and exhibition. The hens lay well and may give between 120 and 140 small tinted eggs in a year. They are good sitters and – as with some other bantam breeds – broody hens have traditionally been used to incubate the eggs of game birds such as pheasant, quail and partridge.
