= Wyandotte chicken =

American breed of chicken

Wyandotte
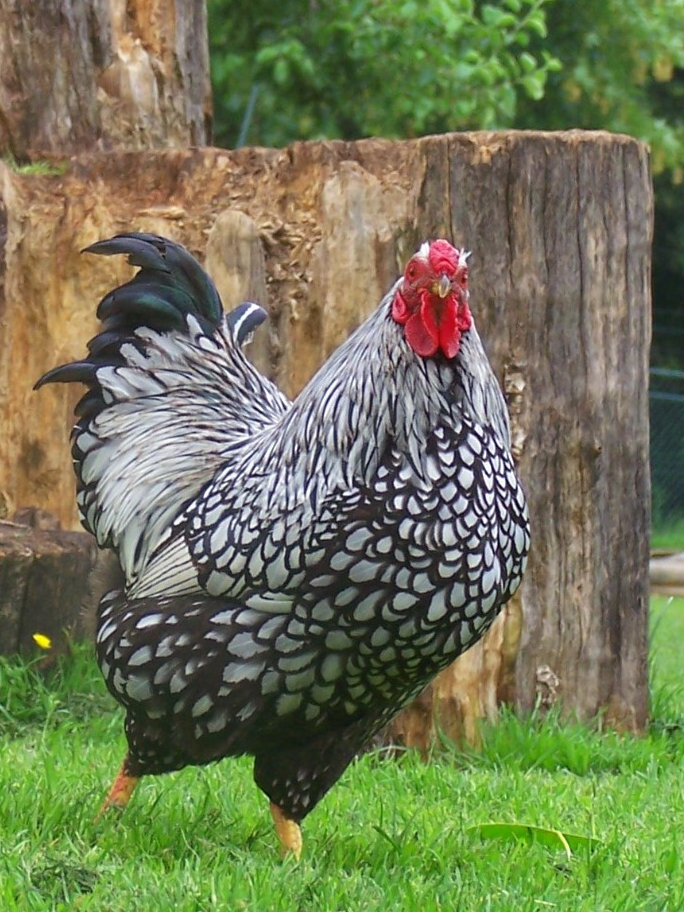
- A silver-laced male, the original variety

- Black hen
- Conservation status: not at risk
- Other names: American Sebright (before 1883)
- Country of origin: United States
- Use: dual-purpose

Traits
- Weight: Male: 3.5–4 kg (8–9 lb); Female: 2.7–3.2 kg (6–7 lb)
- Skin color: yellow
- Egg color: brown
- Comb type: rose

Classification
- APA: American
- EE: yes
- PCGB: soft feather: heavy
- Chicken; Gallus gallus domesticus

The Wyandotte is an American breed of dual-purpose chicken, raised both for its brown eggs and for its yellow-skinned meat. It was developed in the 1870s, and was named for the indigenous Wyandot people of North America. It has many color variants, and is also kept for showing. It was originally known as the American Sebright.

== History ==
The Wyandotte was created in the United States in the 1870s by four people, H. M. Doubleday, John Ray, L. Whittaker and Fred Houdlette. The first type was the silver-laced, which was included in the American Standard of Perfection of the American Poultry Association in 1883; it was taken to Britain at about the same time. It had previously been known as the Sebright Cochin or American Sebright. The origin of the breed is unknown; it is thought derive partly from spangled Hamburgs and dark Brahmas – the Hamburg for the rose comb and the Brahma for the color pattern.

The gold-laced variant was produced by breeding silver-laced hens with gold-spangled Hamburg and partridge Cochin cocks, the white was a sport of the silver-laced, and the buff variant came from crossing the silver-laced with buff Cochin stock; the black variant was also a sport, of both the silver-laced and the gold-laced. The partridge variety came from crossing the gold-laced with Indian Game, partridge Cochin, gold-pencilled Hamburghs, and a strain called "Winnebago". The Columbian was the result of a chance crossing of white Wyandottes with barred Plymouth Rock birds; it was named for Columbian Exposition and World's Fair in Chicago, Illinois, in 1893. The first Wyandotte bantams were added to the Standard of Perfection in 1933.

In 2015 the breed was listed as "recovering" by the American Livestock Conservancy; in 2016 it was no longer considered to be in danger and was removed from the priority list. In Germany it is listed in category IV, "alert", on the Rote Liste of the Gesellschaft zur Erhaltung alter und gefährdeter Haustierrassen.

== Characteristics ==
The Wyandotte is a fairly large bird, with weights for adult birds in the range 2.7 to 4 kg (6 to 9 lb). The body is of medium length, broad in the back and with a deep, full and well-rounded breast. It is clean-legged and fairly close-feathered, and has a broad skull with a rose comb. The skin and shanks are yellow, and the ear-lobes, face and wattles are red.

Silver-laced cocks may occasionally display hen feathering.

In the United States, nine color varieties are recognized by the American Poultry Association: black (1893), blue (1977), buff (1893), Columbian (1905), golden laced (1888), partridge (1893), silver laced (1883), silver penciled (1902) and white (1888). For bantams, the same nine colors are recognized, with the addition of buff Columbian.

In Europe, the Entente Européenne lists thirty colors. The Poultry Club of Great Britain recognizes barred, black, blue, blue-laced, blue partridge, buff, buff-laced, Columbian, gold-laced, partridge, red, silver-laced, silver-pencilled and white.

== Use ==
It is a dual-purpose breed, raised both for eggs and for meat. It matures moderately rapidly, and hens are good layers of large brown eggs. It is a popular show bird, particularly in Germany.

White cock in 1913

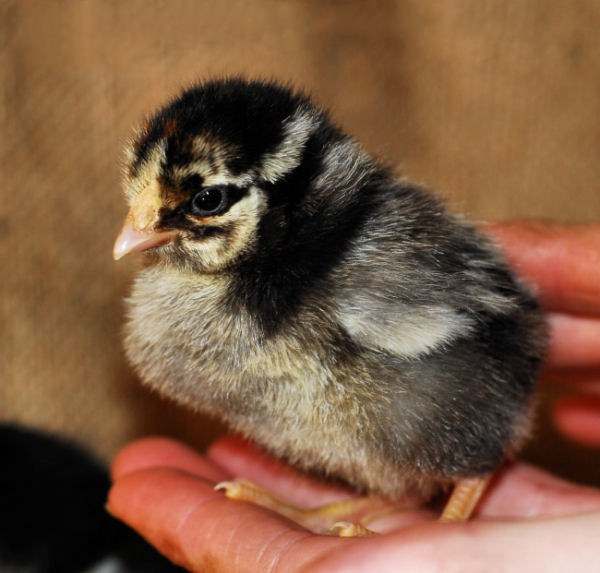
Silver-laced chick, three days old

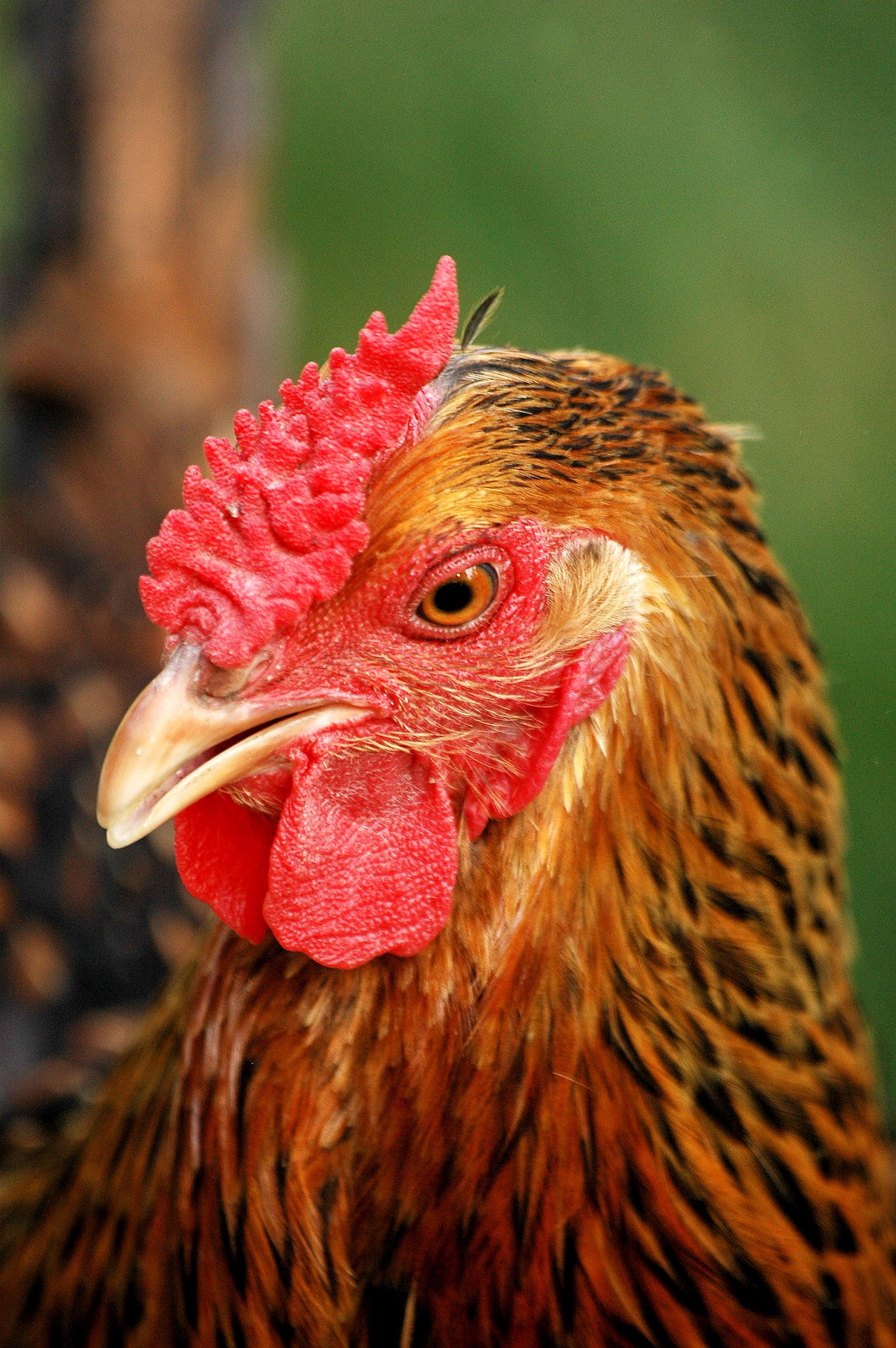
Gold-laced hen

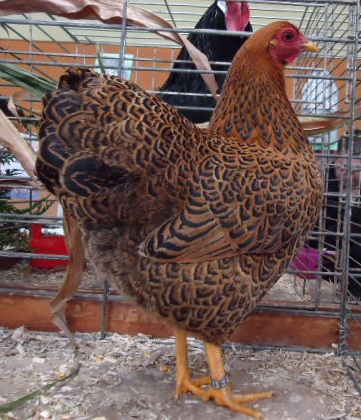
Partridge hen
