= Marsh Daisy chicken =

Breed of chicken

Marsh Daisy
- Conservation status: RBST: at risk
- Country of origin: United Kingdom
- Use: eggs

Traits
- Weight: Male: 2.95 kg; Female: 2.5 kg
- Egg color: tinted
- Comb type: rose comb

Classification
- PCGB: rare soft feather: light
- Chicken; Gallus gallus domesticus

The Marsh Daisy is a rare breed of chicken originating in Lancashire, England. Its name may be related to its origin in a marsh-like area, or that its large rose comb resembles the flower of the Marsh Daisy (Armeria maritima).

The Marsh Daisy is a hardy, economical barnyard chicken, but is slow to mature. It is a lightweight breed of standard fowl, with males at a maximum of 2.95 kilos (6.5 pounds) and females 2.5 kilos (5.5 pounds). A good forager, it prefers being kept free range. Though generally calm, it is active and can fly. Hens are layers of a fair number of tinted eggs. Distinguishing characteristics are the 'Rose comb', 'white earlobes' and 'willow green legs'. Known for being flighty, and slow to mature, the hardiness of the breed is the primary feature that allows them to develop, and breeders take pleasure in raising such a rare breed.

There are currently no Bantam variations on the Marsh Daisy.

== History ==
Beginning in the 1880s in Southport, Lancashire, Old English Game, roosters were crossed with Malay hens to create the foundation for the breed. Black Hamburgs, White Leghorns, and Sicilian Buttercups were also added to cement its characteristics. The Marsh Daisy would become a proper, defined breed in England as of 1913.

The Marsh Daisy has never had any populations of consequence abroad, and has never been recognized for showing by organizations such as the American Poultry Association. Extremely rare even in its homeland, it is listed as an endangered breed by the Rare Breeds Survival Trust of the United Kingdom. It was once found in Black, Brown, Buff, Wheaten and White color varieties, the Wheaten and Brown are the most common, the Buff white and black have been reintroduced by dedicated breeders. It has no bantam version.
