= Brahma chicken =

American breed of chicken

Brahma
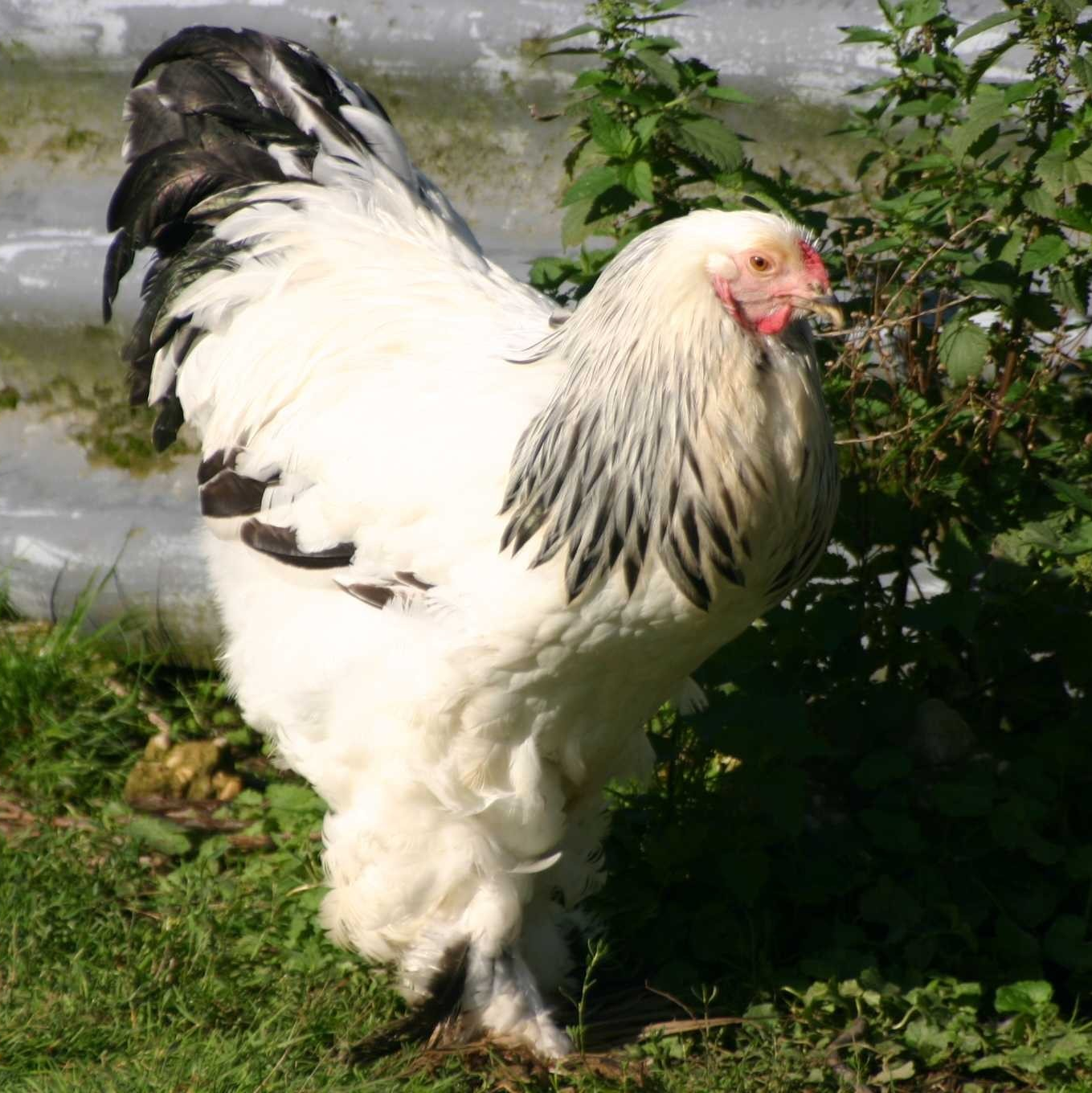
- Light, male
- Other names: Brahma Pootra; Burnham; Gray Chittagong; Shanghai
- Country of origin: United States

Traits
- Weight: Male: 5.5 kg; Female: 4.5 kg
- Egg color: brown
- Comb type: pea

Classification
- APA: Asiatic
- ABA: feather legged
- EE: yes
- PCGB: soft feather: heavy
- Chicken; Gallus gallus domesticus

The Brahma is an American breed of chicken. It is believed that it was first bred in the United States from birds imported from the Chinese port of Shanghai, and was the principal American meat breed from the 1850s until about 1930.

== History ==
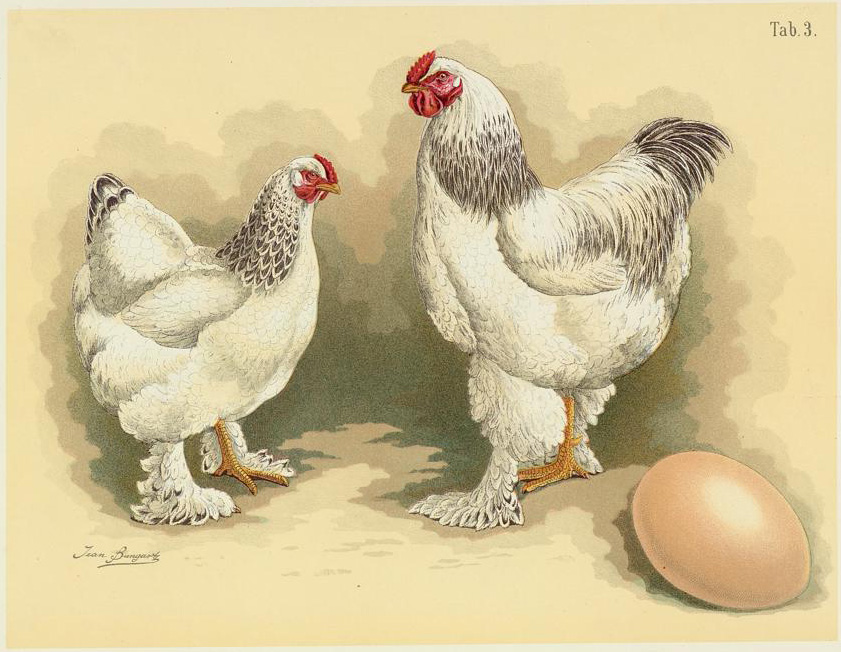
Light cock and hen, illustration from Jean Bungartz, Geflügel-Album, 1885

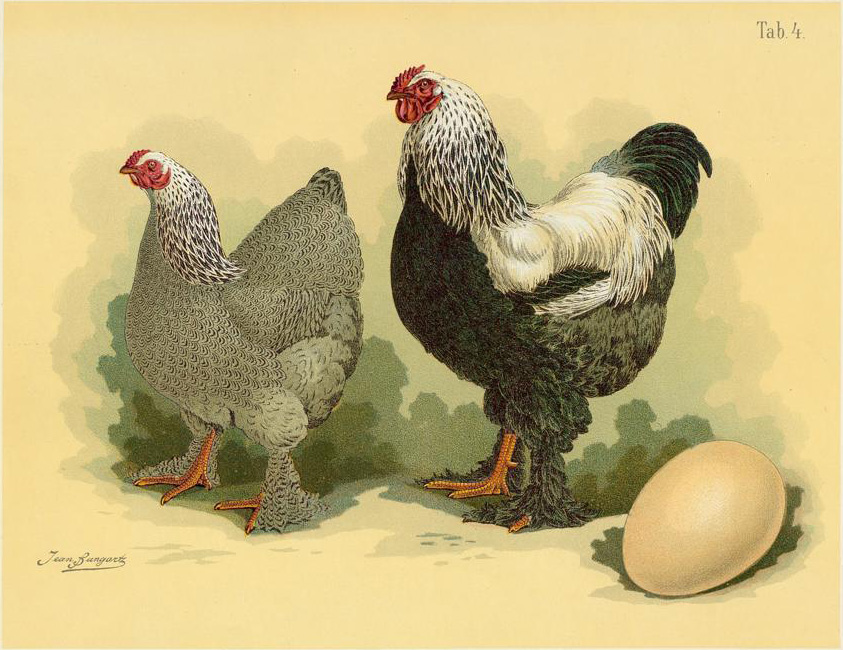
Dark cock and hen, illustration from Jean Bungartz, Geflügel-Album, 1885

There has been controversy and confusion over the origin of the Brahma. It appears to have developed in the United States from large birds, with heavily feathered legs, imported in the 1840s from the Chinese port of Shanghai, and thus known as "Shanghai" birds. The distinctive head shape and pea comb of the Brahma probably result from cross-breeding with Grey Chittagong birds of Malay type, imported from Chittagong in eastern Bengal (now Bangladesh); these characteristics distinguish the Brahma from the Cochin, which also derives from "Shanghai" birds.

At first there were many different strains and at least a dozen different names for the breed. At a meeting of poultry judges in Boston in 1852, agreement was reached to name it "Brahmapootra"; this later became "Brahma".

Brahmas were first exported to England in December 1852, when George Burnham sent nine "Gray Shanghaes" to Queen Victoria as a gift. The Dark Brahma variety was developed by English breeders from this stock, and later re-exported to the United States. Both the light and the dark (pencilled) Brahma were included in the first Standard of Excellence, published by the original Poultry Club of Great Britain in 1865. Both were included in the first Standard of Perfection of the American Poultry Association, published in 1874; the buff variant was added in 1924 or 1929.

The Brahma was the principal meat breed in the United States from the 1850s until about 1930. Some birds were very large: weights of about 8 kg (18 lb) for cocks and 6 kg (13 lb) for hens were recorded.

== Characteristics ==
Three color varieties are recognised in the American Standard of Perfection: light, dark, and buff. The light Brahma has a base color of white, with black hackles edged in white and a black tail; the saddle-feathers of the cock are striped with black. The dark Brahma has the most notable difference between cock and hen: the hen has a dark gray and black penciled coloration with the same hackle as the light, whereas the cock has black and white hackles and saddle feathers, and a black base and tail; the wings are white-shouldered, and the primary feathers are edged with white. The Buff Brahma has the same pattern of black as the light, but with a golden buff base color instead of white.

The Australian Poultry Association has accepted black, blue, partridge, crele and barred varieties of Brahma in addition to the standard light, dark, and buff.

Weight averages about 5.5 kg (12 lb) for cocks and 4.5 kg (10 lb) for hens.

== Use ==
The Brahma was an important meat breed in the United States from the 1850s until about 1930. It is a good winter layer of large brown eggs, which weigh approximately 55–60 g.

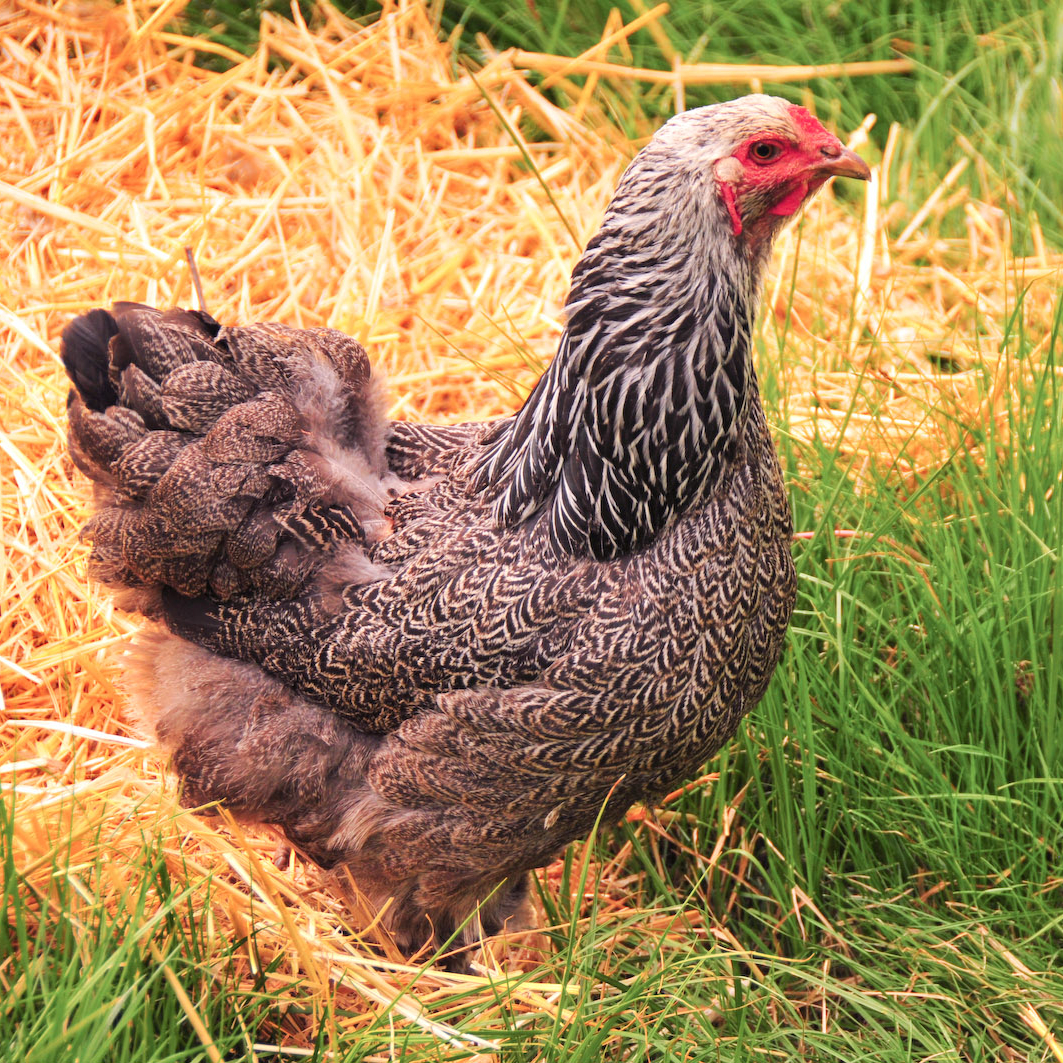
Dark hen

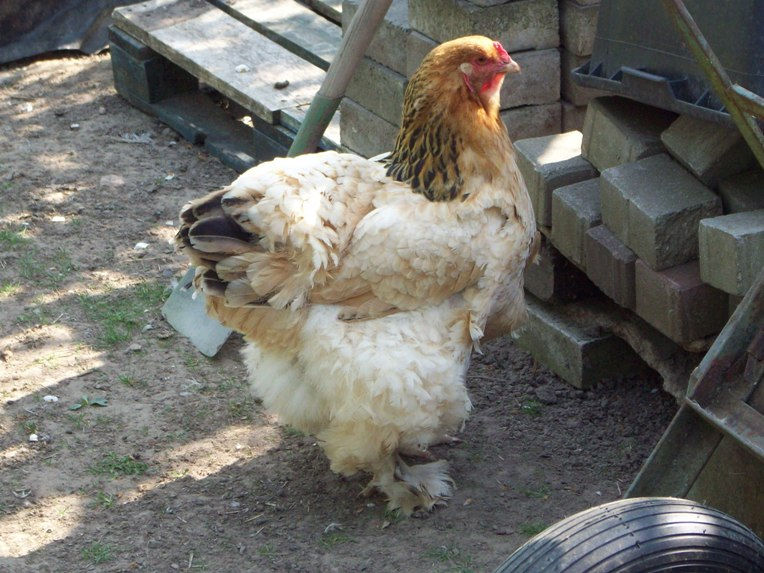
The buff

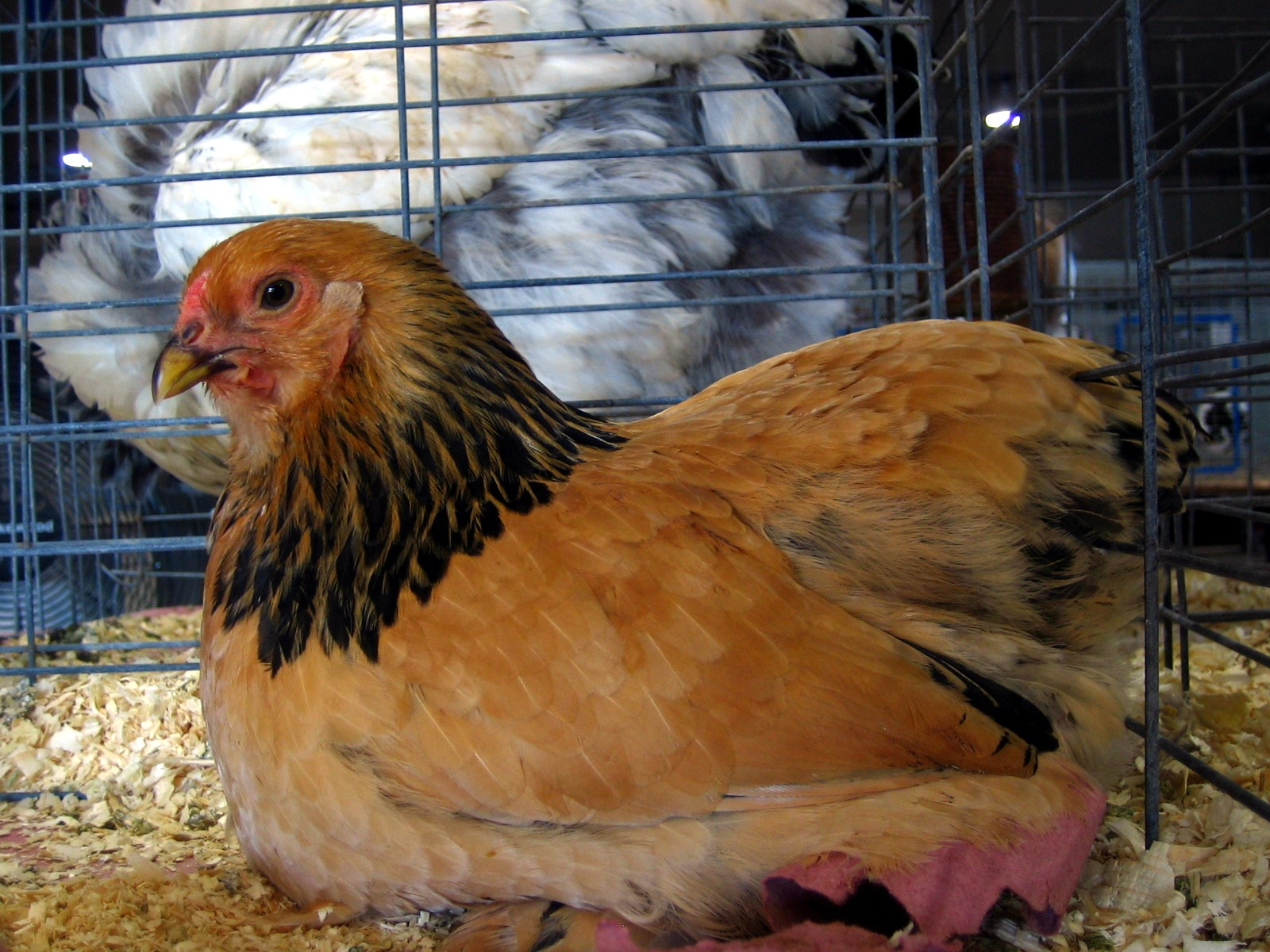
Buff bantam
