= Cochin chicken =

Breed of chicken

Cochin
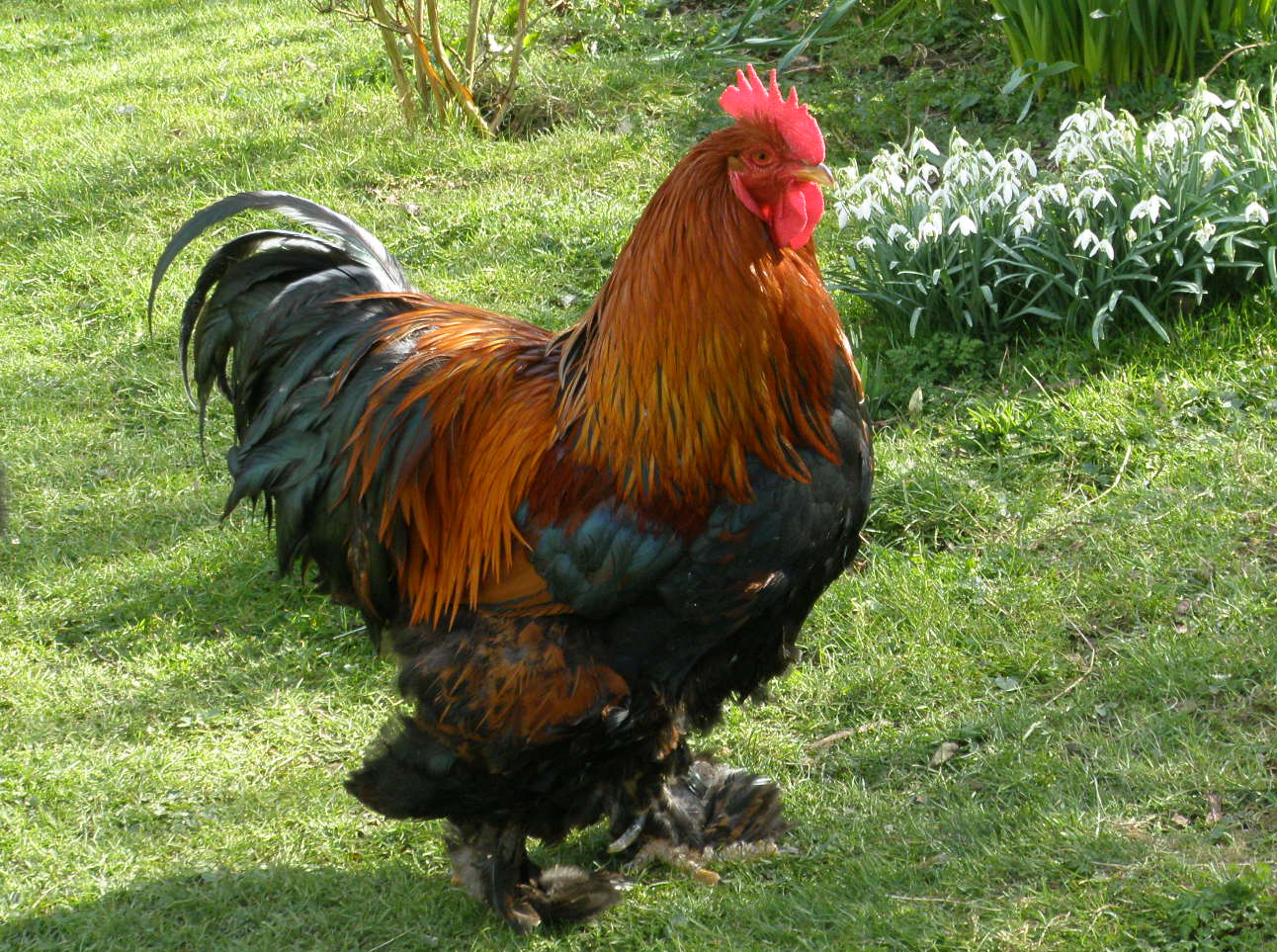
- Partridge cock
- Conservation status: FAO (2007): not at risk; Livestock Conservancy (2020): recovering
- Other names: Shanghai; Cochin-China
- Country of origin: China
- Use: ornamental

Traits
- Weight: Male: Standard: 3.6–5.9 kg; Bantam: 900 g; Female: Standard: 3.2–5.0 kg; Bantam: 800 g
- Egg colour: brown
- Comb type: single

Classification
- APA: Asiatic
- ABA: feather legged
- EE: yes
- PCGB: soft feather: heavy
- Chicken; Gallus gallus domesticus

The Cochin is a breed of large domestic chicken. It derives from large feather-legged chickens brought from China to Europe and North America in the 1840s and 1850s. It is reared principally for exhibition. It was formerly known as the Cochin-China.

== History ==
Like the Brahma, the Cochin derives from very large feather-legged chickens brought from China to Europe and North America in the 1840s and 1850s. These were at first known as "Shanghai" birds, and later as "Cochin-Chinas". The large size and striking appearance of these birds contributed to a sudden large increase of interest in poultry-breeding in Western countries, sometimes described as "hen fever".

The Cochin was included in the first edition of the Standard of Excellence in Exhibition Poultry, prepared by William Bernhardt Tegetmeier for the first Poultry Club of Great Britain in 1865. The colours described are buff, black, cinnamon, grouse, lemon, partridge, silver buff, silver cinnamon, and white. Bantam Cochins were not listed.

The Cochin, both full-sized and bantam, was included in the first edition of the Standard of Excellence of the American Poultry Association in 1874. The original colours were white, partridge, buff and black; other colours were later added.

== Characteristics ==
The most distinctive feature of the Cochin is the excessive plumage that covers leg and foot. The skin beneath the feathers is yellow.

In the United Kingdom the recognised colour varieties, for large fowl only, are black, blue, buff, cuckoo, partridge and grouse, and white; Cochin bantams are not recognised by the Poultry Club of Great Britain. However, the Entente Européenne treats the Pekin Bantam as equivalent to the bantam Cochin. The Entente Européenne lists the same nine colours for large fowl, and twenty-four for the bantam; any of the bantam varieties may be frizzled, with the feathers curling outwards. The American Poultry Association recognises nine colours for the full-sized bird – barred, black, blue, brown, buff, golden-laced, partridge, silver-laced, and white; the same colours are recognised for the bantam, with the addition of four more: birchen, Columbian, mottled, and red.

== Use ==
The Cochin has been bred principally for exhibition, at the expense of productive characteristics. It is a good layer of very large tinted eggs, and lays well in winter. The hens are good sitters and good mothers, and may be used to hatch the eggs of turkeys and ducks. The meat tends to be coarse in texture and excessively dark; capons slaughtered at an age of 12–16 months provide a good large table bird.

== Gallery ==
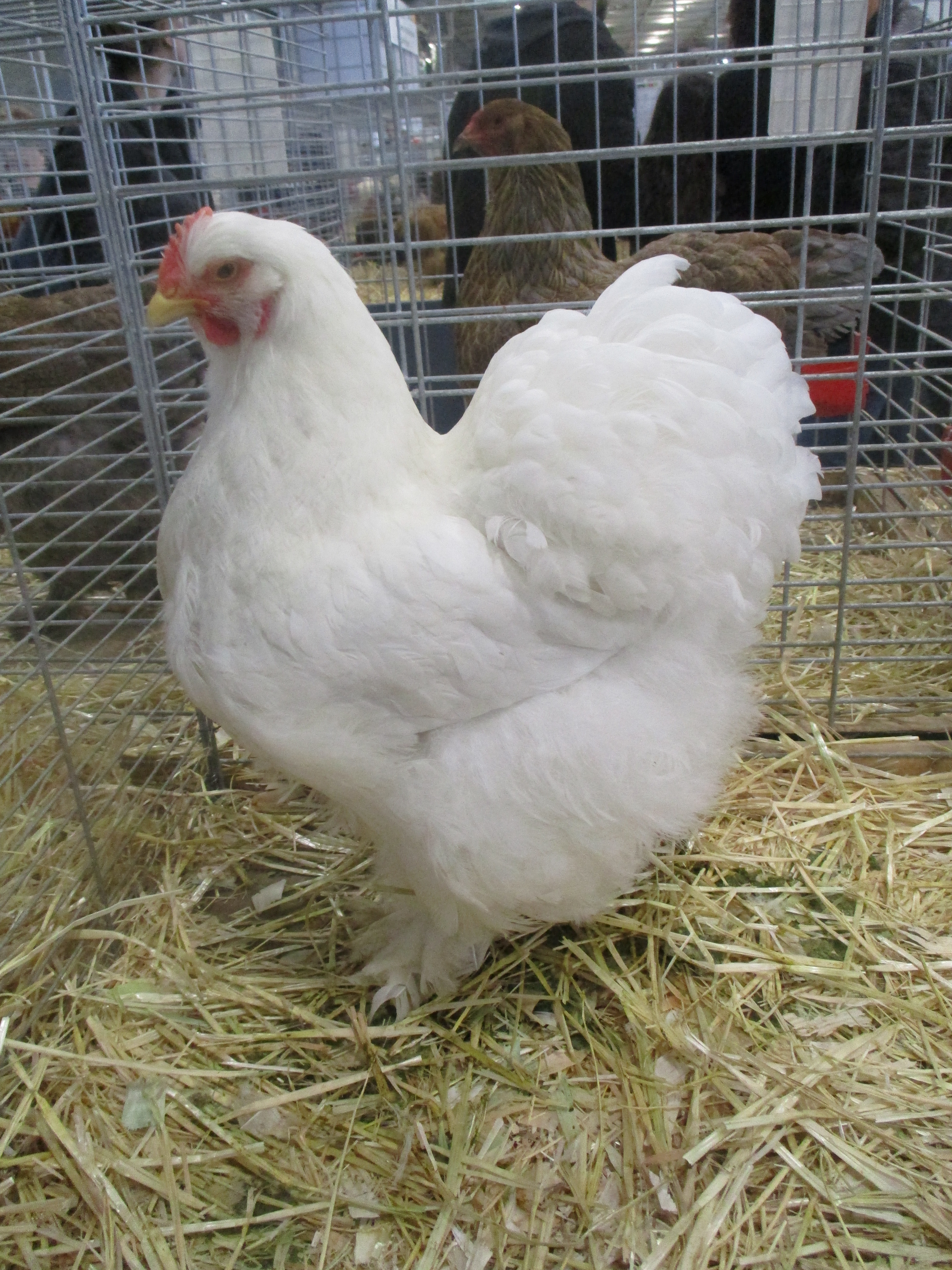
White hen

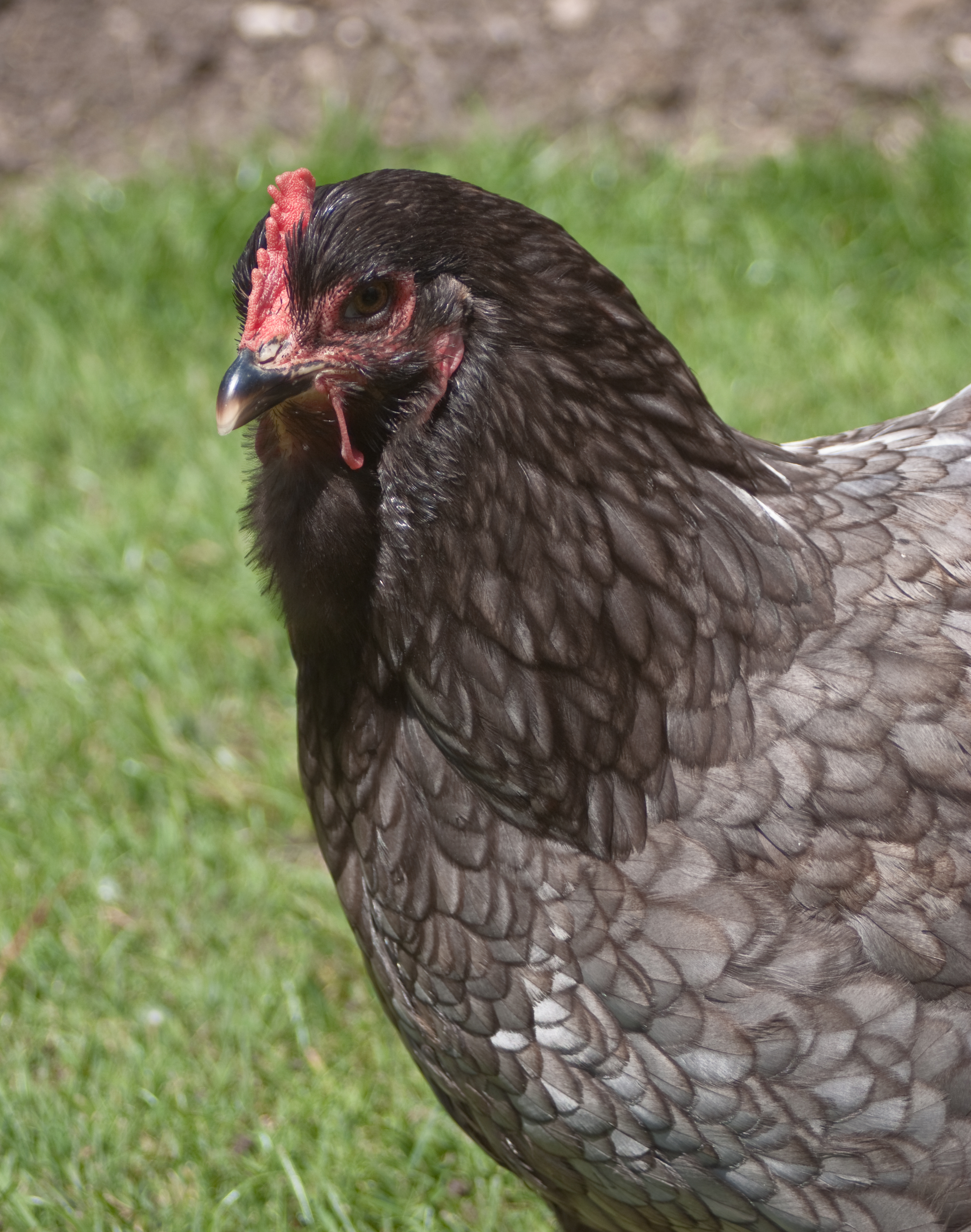
Blue hen

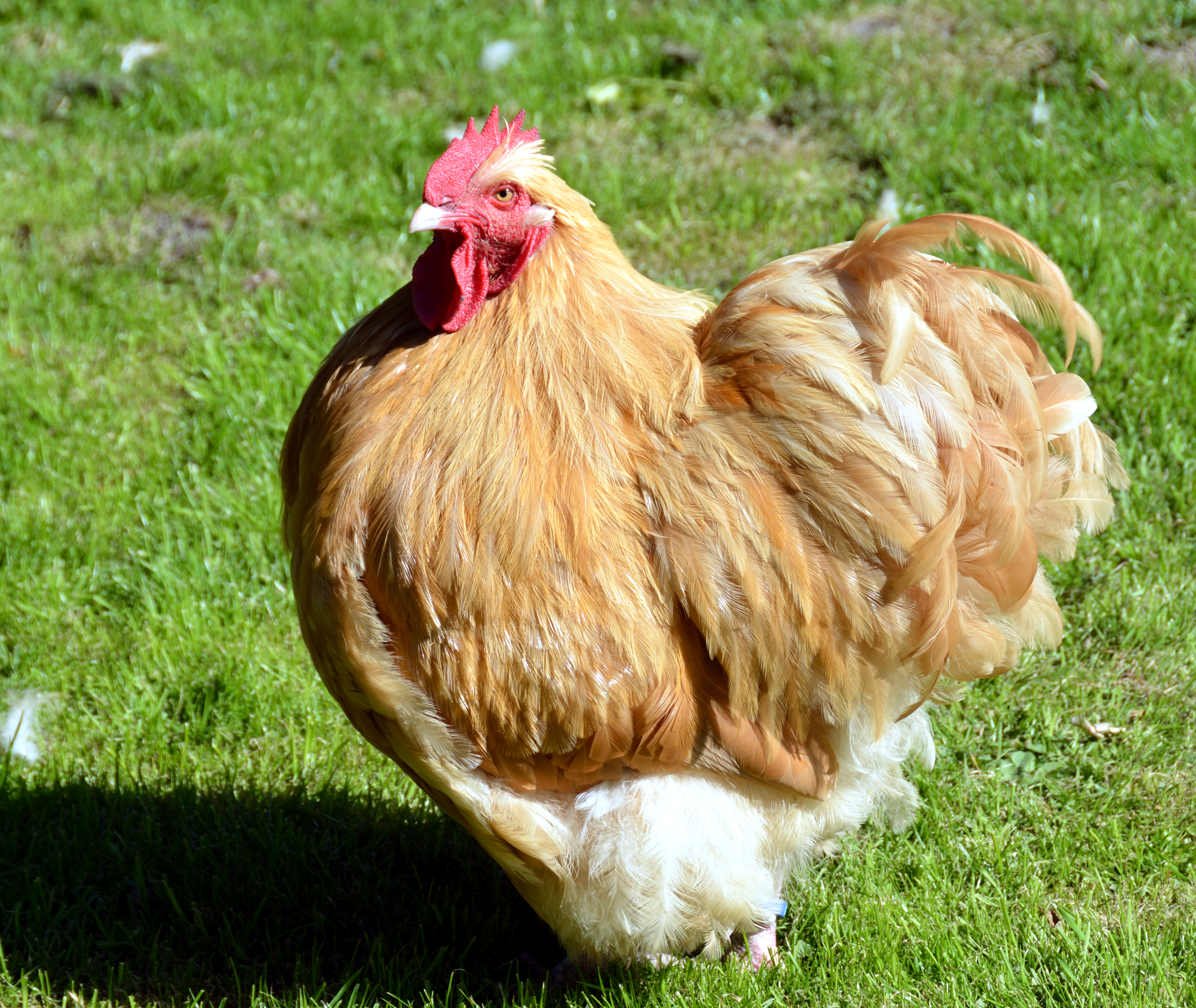
Buff cock

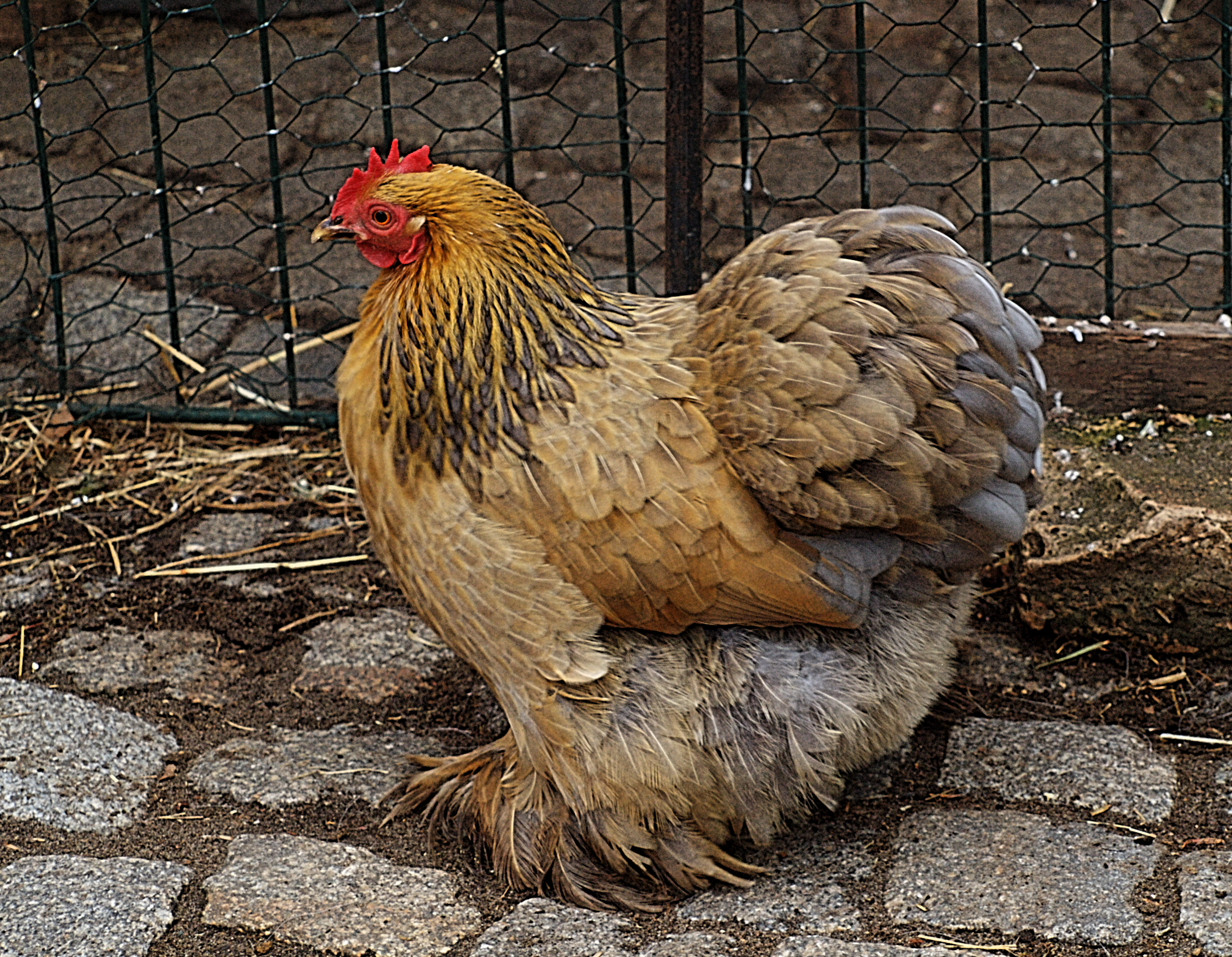
Partridge bantam hen

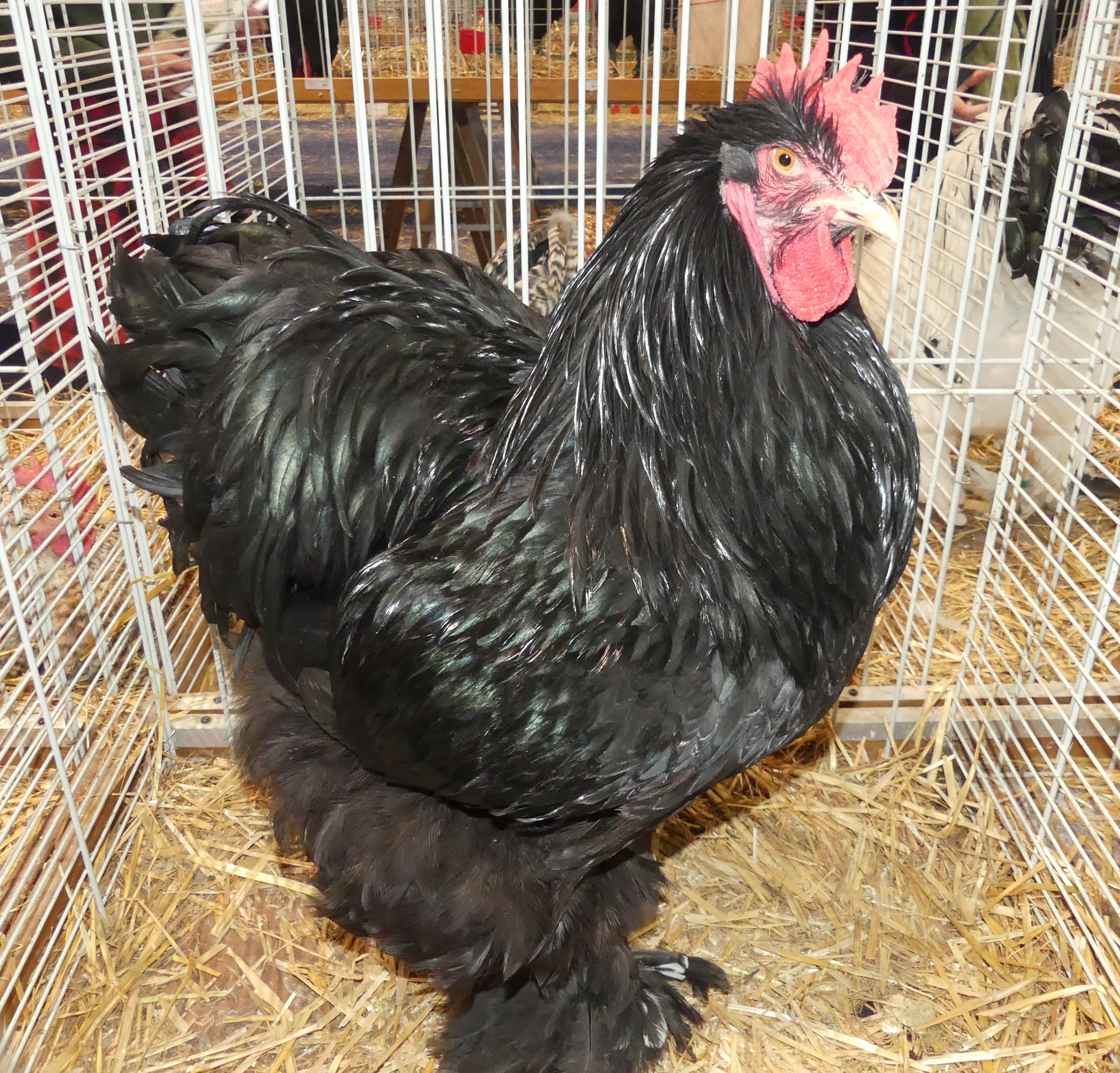
Black cock
