= Malay Game =

Breed of chicken

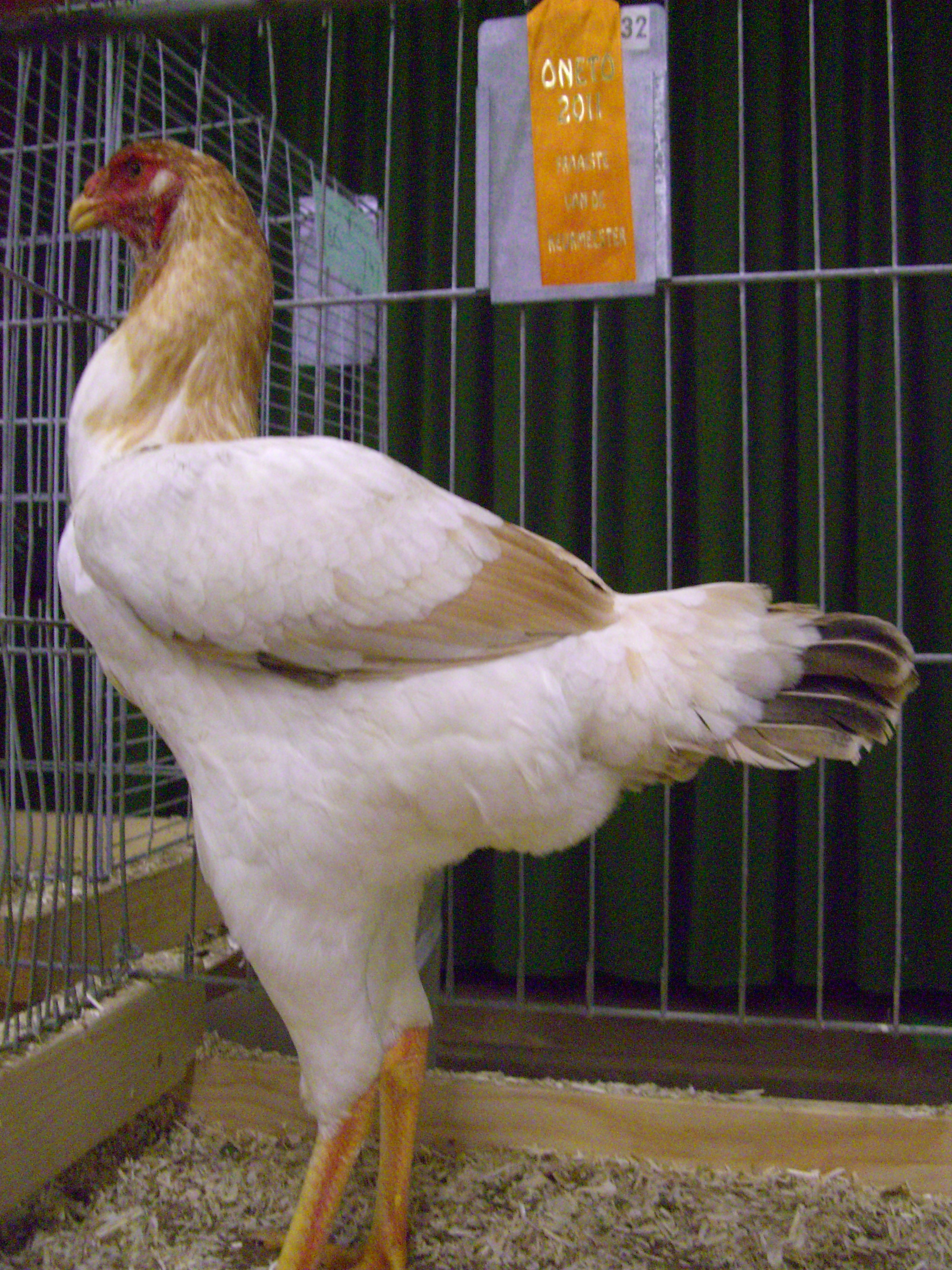
- Conservation status: FAO (2007): not at risk; DAD-IS (2023): at risk/unknown
- Other names: Malay

Traits
- Weight: Male: Standard: about 5 kg; Bantam: about 1.2–1.35 kg; Female: Standard: about 4.1 kg; Bantam: about 1.0–1.15 kg

Classification
- APA: all other standard breeds
- ABA: all other comb clean legged
- EE: yes
- PCGB: Asian hard feather
- Chicken; Gallus gallus domesticus

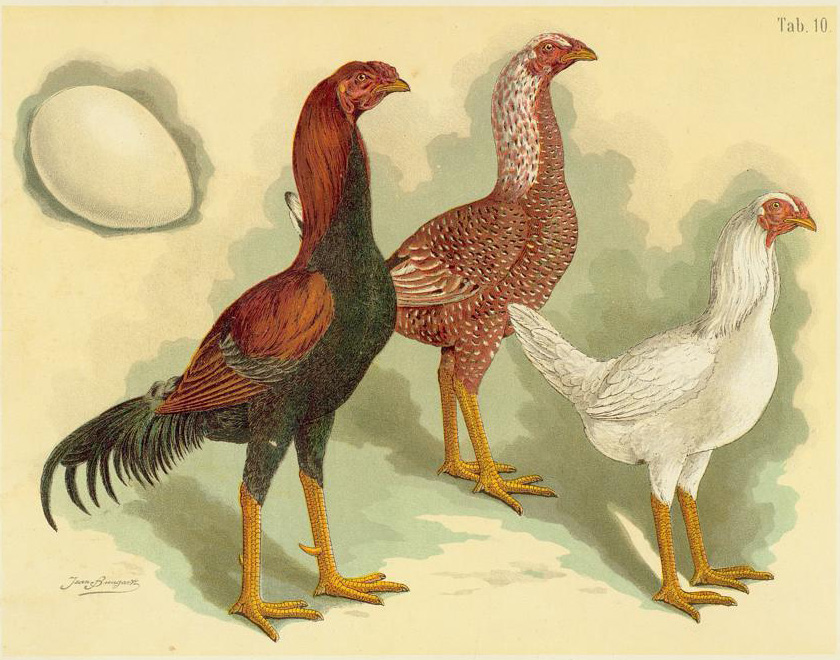
Malays, illustration from Jean Bungartz, Geflügel-Album, 1885

The Malay Game is a breed of game chicken. It is among the tallest breeds of chicken, and may stand over 90 cm (36 inches) high.

The Malay is bred principally in Europe, in Australia and in the United States. It was derived, partly in Devon and Cornwall in south-west England, from birds imported from the Indian subcontinent or from South-east Asia in the first decades of the nineteenth century, when large birds of this type were widespread in northern India, in Indonesia and in the Malay Peninsula.

== History ==
From about 1830 very large game chickens were imported to England, where they became fashionable and were selectively bred by English breeders. Some imports are documented from the Malay Peninsula, others from the Deccan of India. Those from India were sometimes called Grey Chittagongs, but were considered to be closely similar to the Malay. They were particularly numerous in Devon and Cornwall, especially in the area of Falmouth, which was a common first port of call for returning East Indiamen. They were also numerous in Ireland, in the area of Dublin. An early description is that of James Joseph Nolan, published in Dublin in 1850.

Malays were shown at the first British poultry exhibition in 1845, and were included in the Standard of Excellence, the first edition of the British Poultry Standards, in 1865.

Malay birds were present in Germany and the Netherlands by about 1834, and by 1846 were introduced to the United States also. The black-breasted red Malay was included in the Standard of Perfection of the American Poultry Association from 1883, and the bantam in 1904; five other colours, both standard- and bantam-sized, were added in 1981. Numbers of the breed in the USA are very low; in 2014 its conservation status there was listed as "critical" by the FAO.

A bantam Malay was bred in England in the late nineteenth century. It is usually credited to William Flamank Entwisle, who in his Bantams, published posthumously in 1894, claimed to have been the original breeder of all Malay, Indian Game and Game bantams. In 1889 he showed six bantam Malay hens and six cocks at the Crystal Palace and won all the prizes but one; in an essay published in 1890 he gave the constituent breeds of his bantam Malay as Asil, Indian Game and Malay large fowl, and Game bantams. A breeder named Huxtable, from South Molton in Devon, also claimed to have created a Malay bantam from Malay stock only, selecting for small size from about 1870.

== Characteristics ==
The Malay is among the tallest breeds of chicken, and may stand over 90 cm (35 in) high. The Poultry Club of Great Britain lists five colour varieties – black, black-red, pile, spangled and white – but does not exclude other colours. The same colours are recognised by the American Poultry Association, with the addition of the wheaten. The Entente Européenne lists sixteen colour variants, of which eight are recognised.

== Use ==
The Malay is kept mostly for showing. Hens may lay approximately 80 eggs per year; the eggs are brownish or golden, and weigh some 50 g.

The Malay was among the breeds used in the development of the Índio Gigante of Brazil.
