= Hrvatica =

Hrvatica is a Croatian word of feminine gender meaning 'Croat'. It may refer to:

- Croatina, a grape variety
- Hrvatica chicken, a domestic chicken breed
