= Hamburg chicken =

Dutch/British breed of chicken

Hamburg
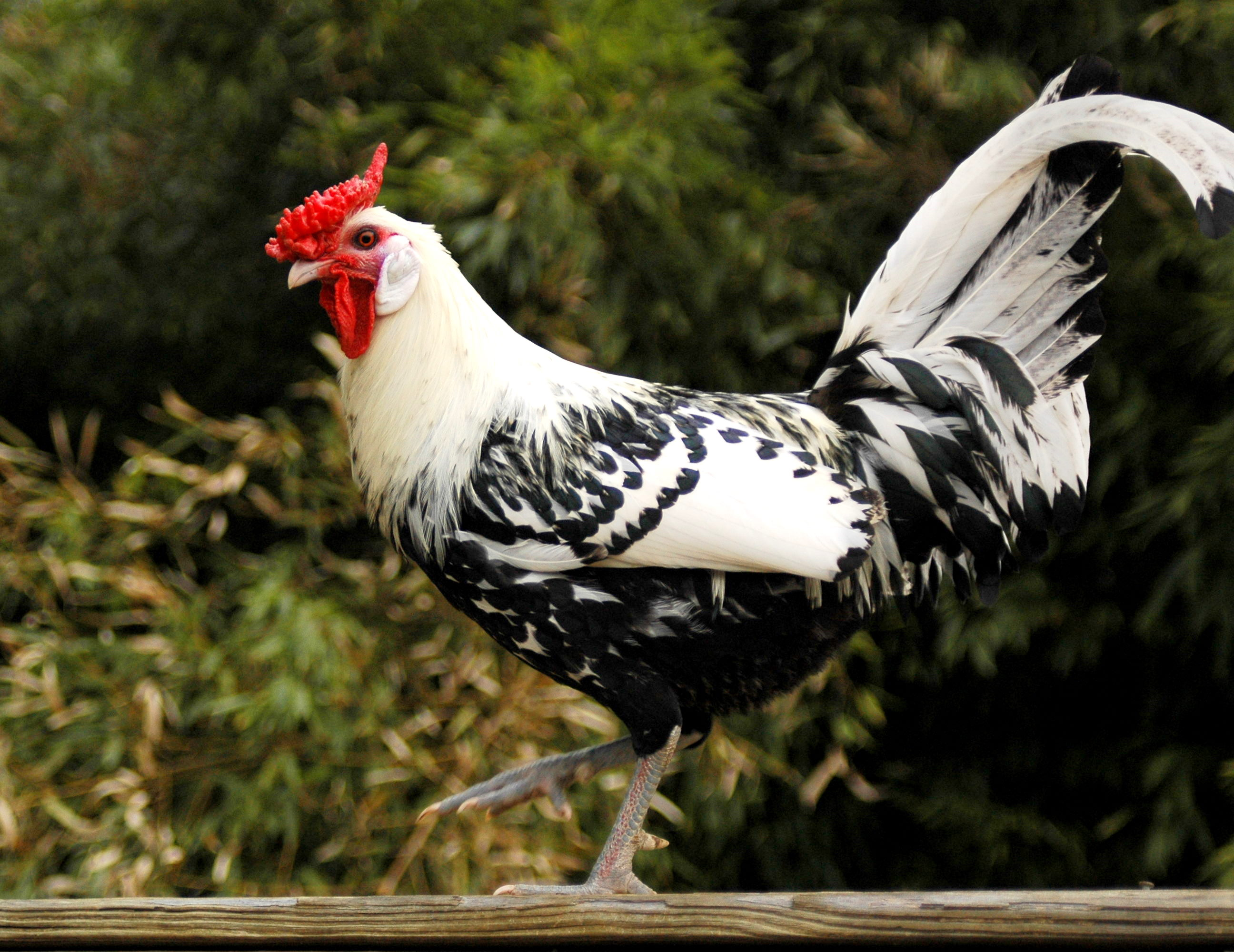
- A silver-spangled cock

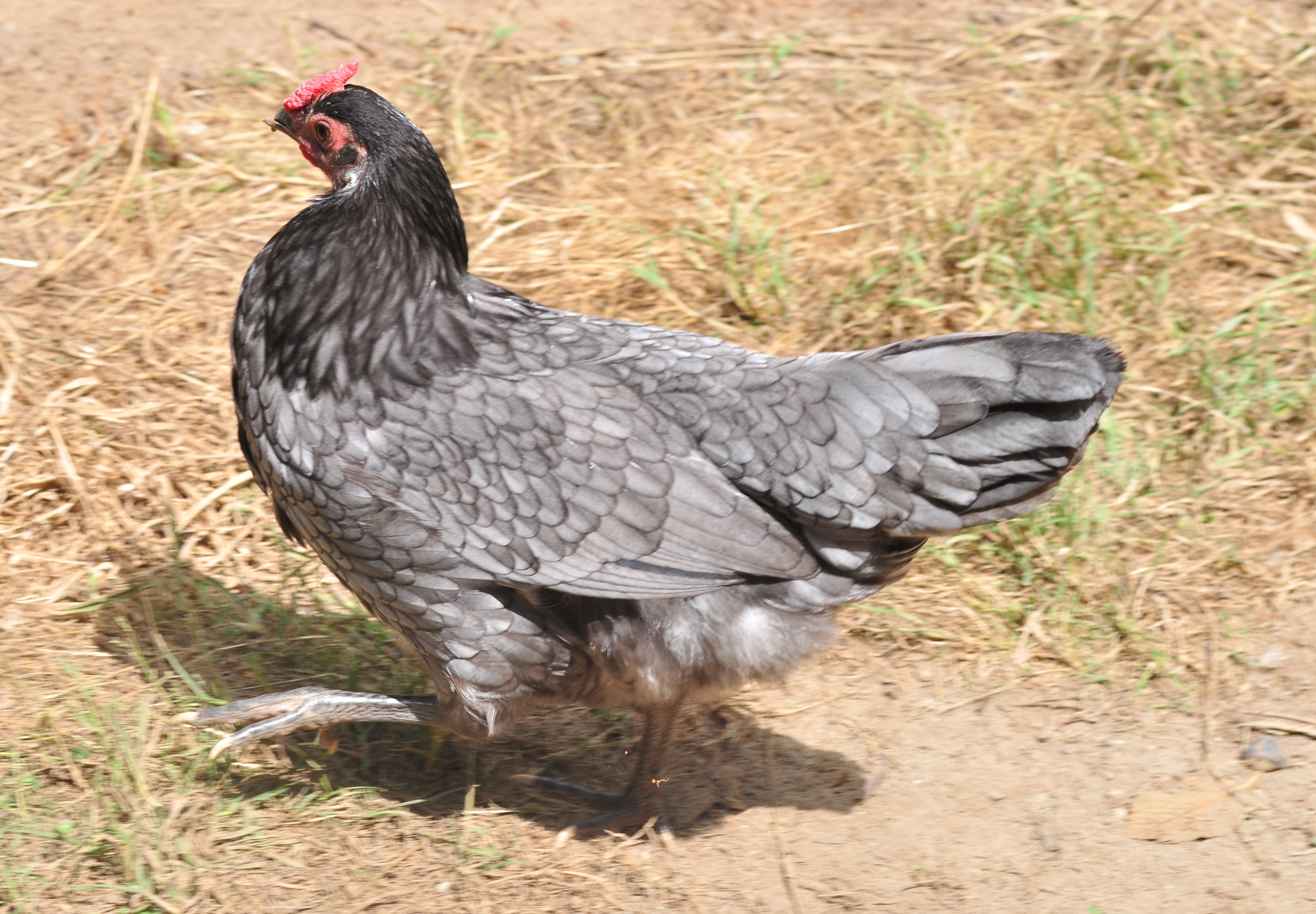
- A blue pullet
- Conservation status: FAO (2007): not at risk; DAD-IS (2023): not at risk
- Other names: Dutch: Hollandse Hoen; German: Hamburger; Hamburgh
- Country of origin: Holland; United Kingdom
- Standard: NHDB (in Dutch)

Traits
- Weight: Male: Standard: 2–2.5 kg; Bantam: 680–790 g; Female: Standard: 1.6–1.8 kg; Bantam: 620–740 g
- Skin colour: white
- Egg colour: white
- Comb type: rose

Classification
- APA: continental
- EE: yes
- PCGB: soft feather: light
- Chicken; Gallus gallus domesticus

The Hamburg, Dutch: Hollands hoen, German: Hamburger, is a Dutch breed of chicken. The name may be spelled Hamburgh in the United Kingdom and in Australia.

== History ==
The history and origins of the Hamburgh are not known. The gold-pencilled and silver-pencilled colour varieties appear to be of Dutch origin, and show some similarity to the Assendelfter. Other varieties appear to have developed in the United Kingdom, particularly in the counties of Lancashire and Yorkshire.

== Characteristics ==
The Hamburg is a small or medium-sized breed. For most colour varieties, cocks weigh 2–2.5 kg and hens about 1.6–1.8 kg or 1.5–2 kg; weights for the pencilled varieties are lower, at about 1.5–1.7 kg and 1.2–1.4 kg respectively.. Weights for bantams are roughly 700–1000 g for cocks and 600–800 g for hens.

The standard ring sizes are 16 mm for cocks and 15 mm for hens, but for the pencilled variants are 15 mm and 13 mm respectively.

Five different colour varieties are recognised by the Poultry Club of Great Britain: silver-spangled, gold-spangled, silver-pencilled, gold-pencilled and black. The same five are included in the American Standard of Perfection, with the addition of the white. The Entente Européenne recognises these six and also the blue; a further five are listed but not recognised: citron-pencilled, gold-white-pencilled, gold-blue-pencilled, cuckoo and red.

== Use ==
The Hamburgh is bred principally for exhibition. Hens lay approximately 120 or 170 white eggs per year, with an average weight of some 50 or 56 g; bantam hens lay some 130 or 140 eggs weighing about 30 or 35 g.
