= The Crystal Palace Poultry Show =

Poultry show in London, United Kingdom

The Crystal Palace Poultry Show (variously also the International Poultry Show and Great Poultry Show) was a poultry show held at The Crystal Palace in London in the United Kingdom. They ran from 1857–1936, with interruption by World War I. It was the world's largest poultry exhibition at several times in its existence, considered the pinnacle of poultry exhibition in the British Empire and despite being a poultry show also allowed the exhibition of domestic rabbits. It was hosted by the Grand International Poultry, Pigeon and Live Stock Shows, Ltd which was liquidated in 1964. The show was superseded in its role by the International Poultry Show, Olympia which has also ceased to exist since.

== History ==
In 1860 the first Sebastopol Goose in Western Europe, imported from Crimea, were exhibited at the show by H. Bayley. In 1861 the Secretary of the show was a Mr Houghton In 1872 50 tons of coal were spent to heat the building and two tons of food was fed to birds exhibited over the four days of the show. The supreme prize of the show was the Sir James Blyth Cup.

=== Exhibition numbers ===
Numbers of birds exhibited varied wildly over the shows existence. In 1892 numbers were falling, though the show still attracted 6300 entries. By the 1907 show was much more successful with 10,533 cages filled (the total number of birds unknown, as many cages held pairs) while the 1912 show had 16,257 entries.

== Notable exhibitors ==
- Charles Darwin
- Mairi Chisholm & Elsie Knocker
- George Sutherland-Leveson-Gower, 3rd Duke of Sutherland
- Thomas Dewar, 1st Baron Dewar
- Robert Grosvenor, 1st Baron Ebury (then Lord Grosvenor)
