= Hrvatica chicken =

Breed of chicken

Hrvatica
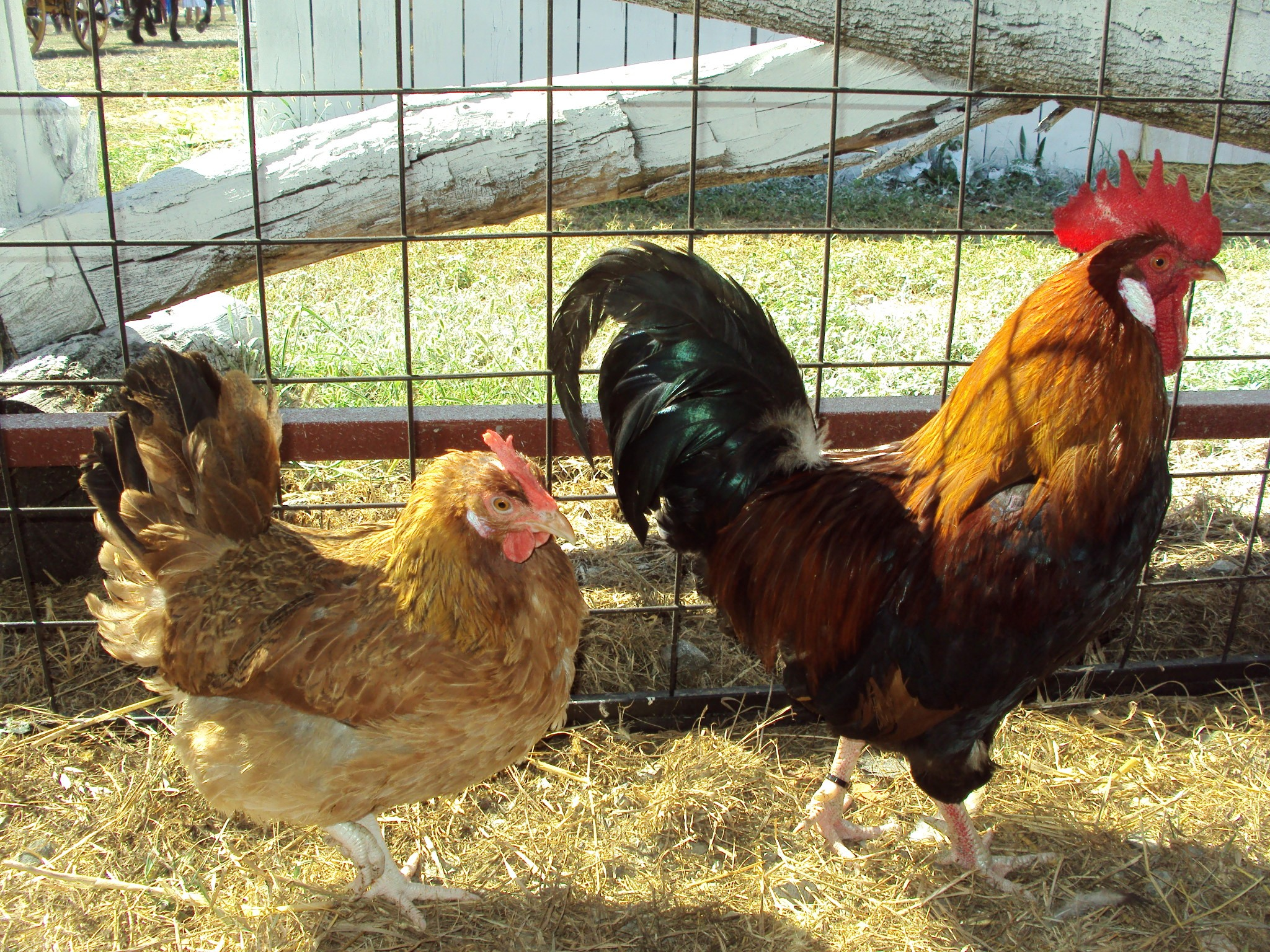
- Country of origin: Croatia
- Use: Triple-purpose: eggs,

Traits
- Weight: Male: Standard: 2.10 kg Bantam: 500 g Carol Ekarius (2007).; Female: Standard: 1.4 kg
- Comb type: pea

Classification
- APA: all other standard breeds
- ABA: all other comb clean legged

The Hrvatica is a Croatian breed of domestic chicken. The breed is widespread in almost all of Croatia and the Balkans. It was developed in 1917 by Ivan Lakuš, in the village of Torčec in the Podravina Province.
