= Rare Poultry Society =

- Formation: 1969
- Founder: Andrew Sheppy
- Purpose: Support rare breeds and revive interest in them in the UK
- Location(s): 10 Trenchard Road, Locking, North Somerset, UK
- Region served: United Kingdom
- Secretary: Patricia Fieldhouse
- Website: http://www.rarepoultrysociety.com and http://www.rarepoultrysociety.org.uk

The Rare Poultry Society, established in 1969, is a British breed club devoted to the protection and promotion of rare poultry breeds, which the Society defines as breeds that do not have their own breed club in the United Kingdom. The society's quarterly newsletter has been used as the source material for a number of books on rare breeds in the United Kingdom.

== Works cited ==
- Hams, Fred (1999). Old Poultry Breeds. Third edition. Buckinghamshire: Shire Books. ISBN 0-7478-0396-X.
- Feltwell, Ray (1992). Small-Scale Poultry Keeping: A Guide to Free-Range Poultry Production. London: Faber and Faber. ISBN 978-0-571-26539-8.
- Scrivener, David (2006). Rare Poultry Breeds. Cambridge: The Crowood Press. ISBN 1-86126-889-0.

== See also ==
- Poultry Club of Great Britain
- Rare breed (agriculture)
