= Poultry show =

Events involving poultry

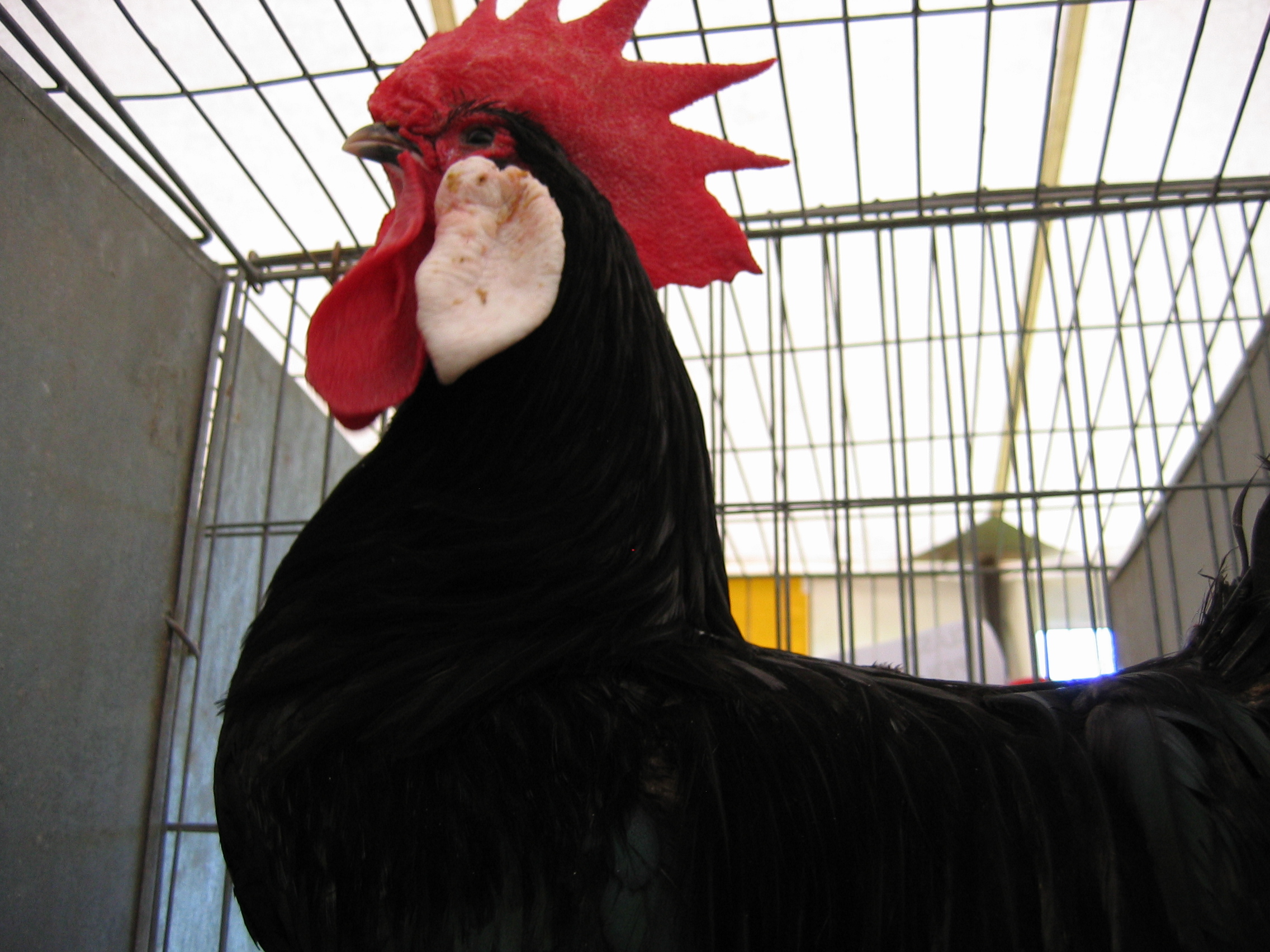
A Black Minorca cock at a Scottish poultry show.

A poultry show is a specific subset of a livestock show that involves the exhibition and competition of exhibition poultry, which may include chickens, domestic ducks, domestic geese, domestic guineafowl and domestic turkey. Domestic pigeon are also exhibited but not universally considered poultry. As well as being independent events, they are also sometimes held in conjunction with agricultural shows.

== Preparation ==
Significant effort is put into exhibiting poultry. Birds are trained for the cages used at shows, and washed and manicured in preparation for an event.

== History ==
The first poultry show in the United Kingdom was in 1845 in London. The exhibition of poultry was promoted as an alternative to cock fighting in the United Kingdom following the banning of such activities in 1849. The first poultry standard in the world was produced in 1865, the British Poultry Standard. The height of the poultry showing in the United Kingdom was during the late 19th and early 20th century, when The Crystal Palace Poultry Show were held at The Crystal Palace, the largest attracting 10,533 filled cages, the actual number of birds unknown as many were pairs. Charles Darwin regularly attended and showed pigeons at these from 1857, and Queen Victoria exhibited her Cochins in 1846 at the Royal Dublin Show. The Crystal Palace Great Poultry Shows continued to run with great success until the Crystal Palace burnt down.

The first poultry show in North America was held on 15-16 November, 1849, in Quincy Market, Boston, surpassing expectations to receive over 1400 entries however it proved a debacle as no poultry standard existed and judging was cancelled as there was no way to decide what was a purebred. A poultry association was organised afterwards and another show attempted the next year, which attracted 12,000 birds. Overcrowding led to judging being cancelled again.

In 1854 P. T. Barnum staged a National Poultry Show at his Barnum's American Museum, which the guidelines of are unknown. It wasn't until 1874 that the American Standard of Perfection were adopted by the recently formed American Poultry Association, creating the first poultry standard in North America.

== Governance ==
Poultry shows are generally organised by a poultry club. Many of these are accredited by a national body, such as the American Poultry Association or the Poultry Club of Great Britain while others, such as Australian poultry clubs are only managed on a state level. Birds exhibited at poultry shows are judged to the local standard, a compiled manual that describe the ideal form of a poultry breed.
