= British Poultry Standards =

British book of poultry standards

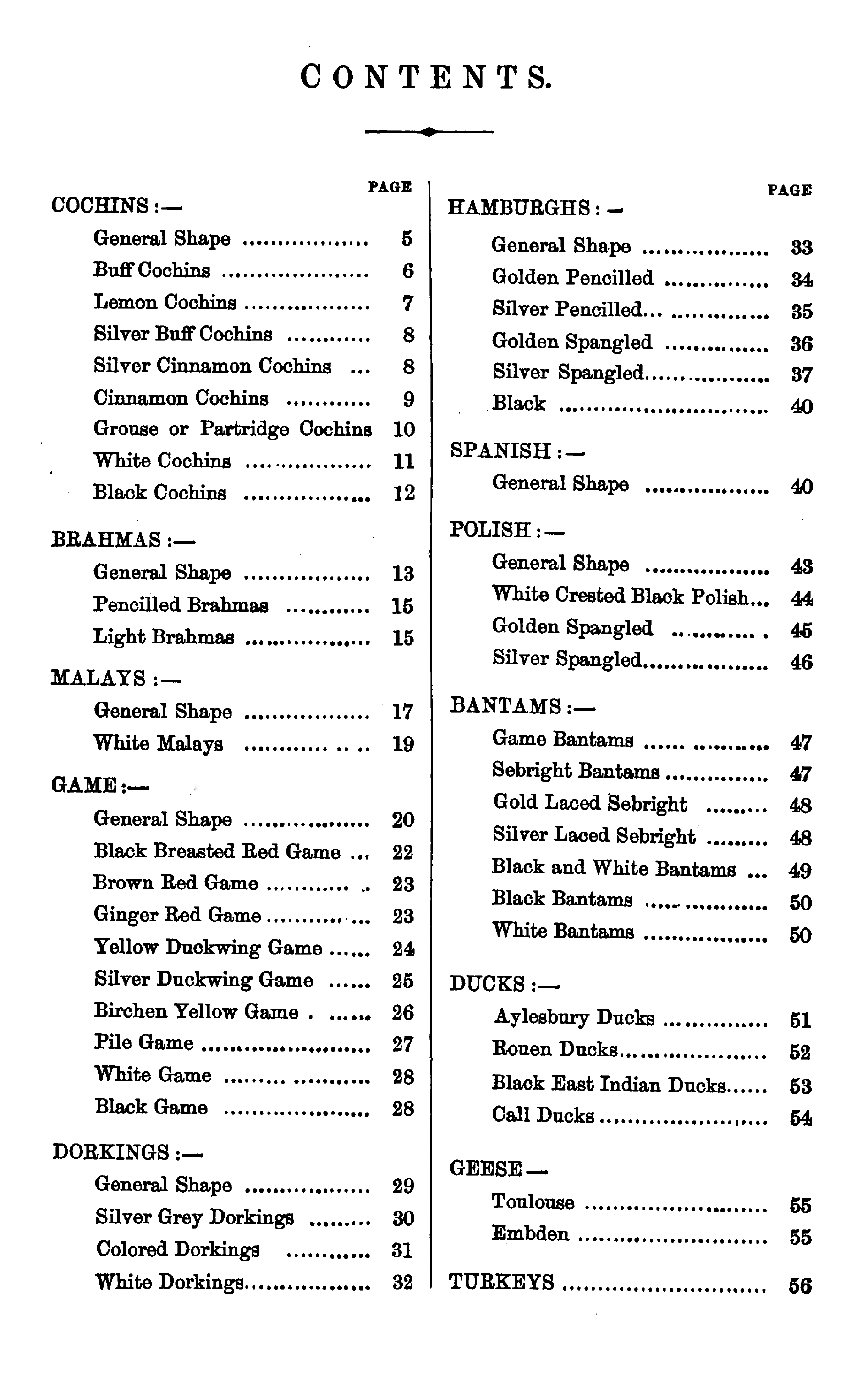
- Contents page of the 1865 edition
- Editor: William Bernhardt Tegetmeier
- Language: English
- Subject: poultry breed standards
- Published: 1865 (Groombridge and Sons, for the Poultry Club)
- Publication place: United Kingdom
- Pages: 56

Front cover of the sixth edition of the British Poultry Standards

The British Poultry Standards is a compilation of the breed standards for poultry in the United Kingdom, approved and published by the Poultry Club of Great Britain. The standards themselves are usually drawn up by the individual specialist breed societies. It is the official reference standard used by judges at poultry shows in the United Kingdom.

It was first published in 1865 as The Standard of Excellence in Exhibition Poultry, and was the earliest publication of its kind in the world. Later editions had various titles until 1905, when the present title was adopted.

== History ==
The standard was first published in 1865 by the original Poultry Club of Great Britain, a club which existed for only three years. It was entitled The Standard of Excellence in Exhibition Poultry and was edited by William Bernhardt Tegetmeier. It was the first publication of its kind. The compilation of the standard was then taken over by the second Poultry Club of Great Britain, which is still active. The number of editions of the standard that have been published is uncertain, as each successive publisher that has been used by the Poultry Club of Great Britain has started again with a first edition. The edition published in 2019 by Wiley-Blackwell is the seventh in the current numbering.

== Use ==
The standard is the official reference for use by judges at poultry shows in the United Kingdom and Ireland. It contains breed standards of more than 150 breeds of chicken, duck, goose and turkey; pigeons are not included.

== Editions ==
Editions of the standards include, but probably are not limited to, these:

- William Bernhard Tegetmeier (editor). The Standard of Excellence in Exhibition Poultry, authorized by the Poultry Club. London: Groombridge and Sons, for the Poultry Club, 1865.
- ——— . The Poultry Book: comprising the breeding and management of profitable and ornamental poultry, their qualities and characteristics; to which is added the Standard of Excellence in exhibition birds, authorized by the Poultry Club. [S.l.]: Routledge, 1867.
- ——— , Harrison Weir (illustrator). The Poultry Book: comprising the breeding and management of profitable and ornamental poultry, their qualities and characteristics; to which is added "The Standard of Excellence in Exhibition Birds," authorized by the Poultry Club. London; New York : George Routledge and Sons, the Broadway, Ludgate, 1867.
- [A.M. Halsted]. The Standard of Excellence as adopted by the American Poultry Society, being a reprint of the same as compiled and adopted by the London Poultry Club, with alterations and additions, adapting it to America. New York: A.M. Halsted, 1867.
- William Bernhard Tegetmeier, Harrison Weir (illustrator). The Poultry Book: comprising the breeding and management of profitable and ornamental poultry, their qualities and characteristics; to which is added "The Standard of Excellence in Exhibition Birds," authorized by the Poultry Club. New edition, greatly enlarged. London; New York : George Routledge and Sons, the Broadway, Ludgate, 1873.
- ——— . The standard of excellence in exhibition poultry, authorised by the Poultry Club, to which is added the American standard. Reprinted from the original editions, with additions. London, 1874.
- Alexander Comyns (editor). The Standard of Perfection for Exhibition Poultry. London: Office of the Poultry Club, [1886].
- T. Threlford (editor), Lewis Wright (introduction). The Poultry Club Standards, containing a complete description of all the recognised varieties of fowls, second edition. London; Paris; New York; Melbourne: Cassell & Company, 1901.
- Lewis Wright. The New Book of Poultry. With Forty-Five Plates, by J.W. Ludlow, and the Poultry Club Standards of Perfection for the Various Breeds. London; Paris; New York; Melbourne: Cassell and Company, 1902. (reprinted 1904)
- T. Threlford (editor), Lewis Wright (introduction). The Poultry Club Standards. Containing a complete description of all the recognised varieties of fowls, third edition. London: Cassell, 1905.
- Sidney Hubert Lewer, Lewis Wright. Wright's Book of Poultry. Revised and edited in accordance with the latest Poultry Club standards by S. H. Lewer. London; Paris; New York; Melbourne: Cassell and Company, [n.d., after 1910].
- William White Broomhead (editor). The Poultry Club Standards: containing a complete description of all the recognised varieties of fowls, ducks, geese and turkeys, fifth edition. London: The Poultry Club, 1922.
- ——— . The Poultry Club Standards, sixth edition. London: Poultry Club of Great Britain, 1923.
- ——— . The Poultry Club Standards, seventh edition. London: The Poultry Club, 1926.
- ——— . The Poultry Club Standards, eighth edition. London: The Poultry Club, 1930.
- [Poultry Club of Great Britain]. British Poultry Standards: Complete specifications and judging points of all standardised breeds and varieties of poultry as compiled by the specialist breed societies and recognised by The Poultry Club of Great Britain. London: Poultry World in association with the Poultry Club of Great Britain, [1954].
- [Poultry Club of Great Britain]. British Poultry Standards. Complete specifications and judging points of all standardised breeds and varieties of poultry as compiled by the specialist breed societies and recognised by the Poultry Club of Great Britain, revised edition, with illustrations. London: Poultry World, [1960].
- C. George May (editor). British Poultry Standards: Complete specifications and judging points of all standardized breeds and varieties of poultry as compiled by the Specialist Breed Societies and recognized by the Poultry Club of Great Britain. London: Iliffe Books, 1971.
- ——— , David Hawksworth. British Poultry Standards: Complete specifications and judging points of all standardized breeds and varieties of poultry as compiled by the Specialist Breed Societies and recognized by the Poultry Club of Great Britain. London; Boston: Butterworth Scientific, 1982.
- ——— . British Poultry Standards: Complete specifications and judging points of all standardized breeds and varieties of poultry as compiled by the Specialist Breed Societies and recognized by the Poultry Club of Great Britain, fourth edition, revised by David Hawksworth. Oxford: Blackwell Scientific, 1994. ISBN 0632038799.
- Victoria Roberts (editor). British Poultry Standards: Complete specifications and judging points of all standardized breeds and varieties of poultry as compiled by the Specialist Breed Societies and recognized by the Poultry Club of Great Britain, fifth edition. Oxford: Blackwell Science, 1997. ISBN 0632040521.
- ——— . British Poultry Standards: Complete specifications and judging points of all standardized breeds and varieties of poultry as compiled by the Specialist Breed Clubs and recognised by the Poultry Club of Great Britain. Oxford: Blackwell, 2008. ISBN 9781405156424.
- J. Ian H. Allonby, Philippe B. Wilson (editors) (2019). British Poultry Standards: complete specifications and judging points of all standardised breeds and varieties of poultry as compiled by the specialist breed clubs and recognised by the Poultry Club of Great Britain, seventh edition. Chichester; Hoboken, New Jersey: Wiley Blackwell. ISBN 9781119509141.
