= William Bernhardt Tegetmeier =

English naturalist (1816–1912)

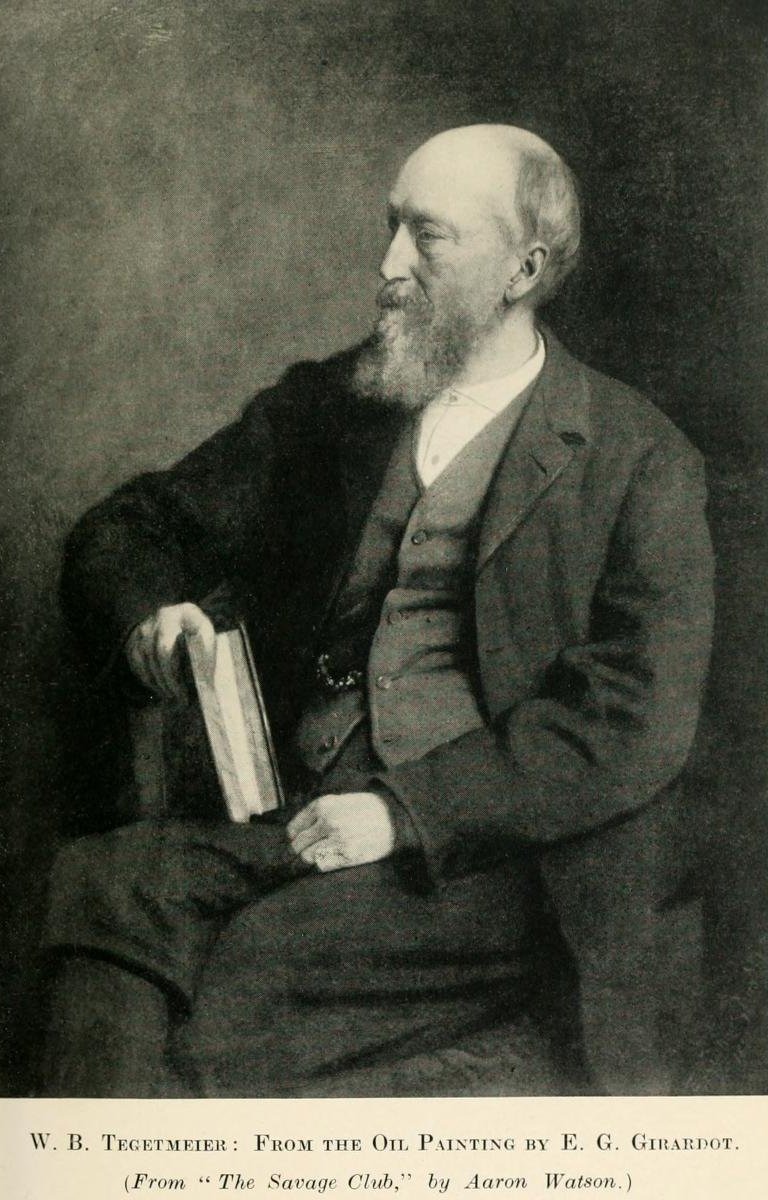

William Bernhardt Tegetmeier FZS (4 November 1816 – 19 November 1912) was an English naturalist, a founding member of the Savage Club, a popular writer and journalist of domestic science. A correspondent and friend of Charles Darwin, Tegetmeier studied pigeon breeds and the optimality of hexagonal honeycomb cells constructed by honeybees. He wrote a number of books dealing with home economics, poultry farming, pigeon breeds, bee-keeping and on the maintenance of livestock.

== Early life ==
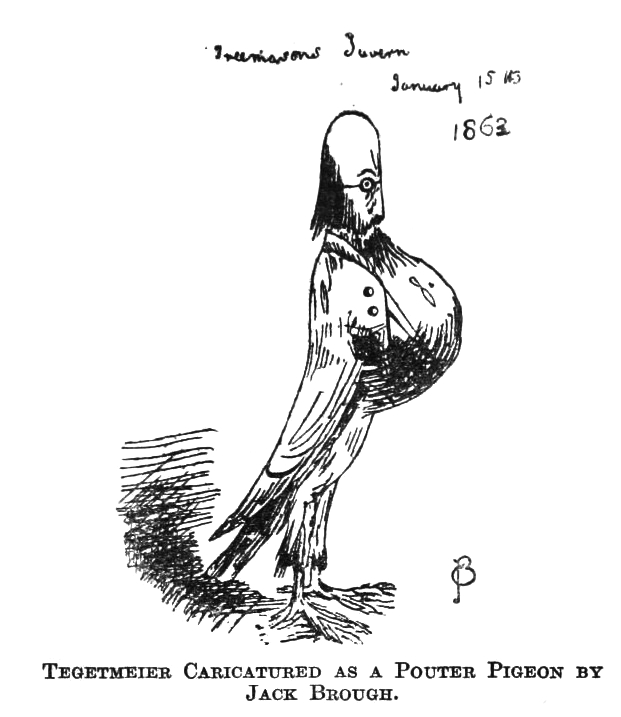
Caricature by Jack Brough

Born in Colnbrook, Buckinghamshire, the oldest of three sons, of Sarah Luer and Godfrey Conrad Tegetmeier. His father was a Hanover surgeon who had worked on board the H.M.S. Niobe during the war in America and briefly on a Russian man-of-war. He received his early education at home and when he was twelve, the family moved to London and he worked as an apprentice to his father for five years before studying at the University College London and training at the hospital where he was a clinical clerk to John Elliotson. Some of his fellow students included Ray Lankester, William Jenner and W.B. Carpenter. He then moved to work in Northamptonshire to assist local physician Frederic Gee. Returning to London in 1841 he attended lectures by John Hoppus to train in mesmerism and then led a life of Bohemianism and worked as a freelance journalist.

== Bohemianism ==
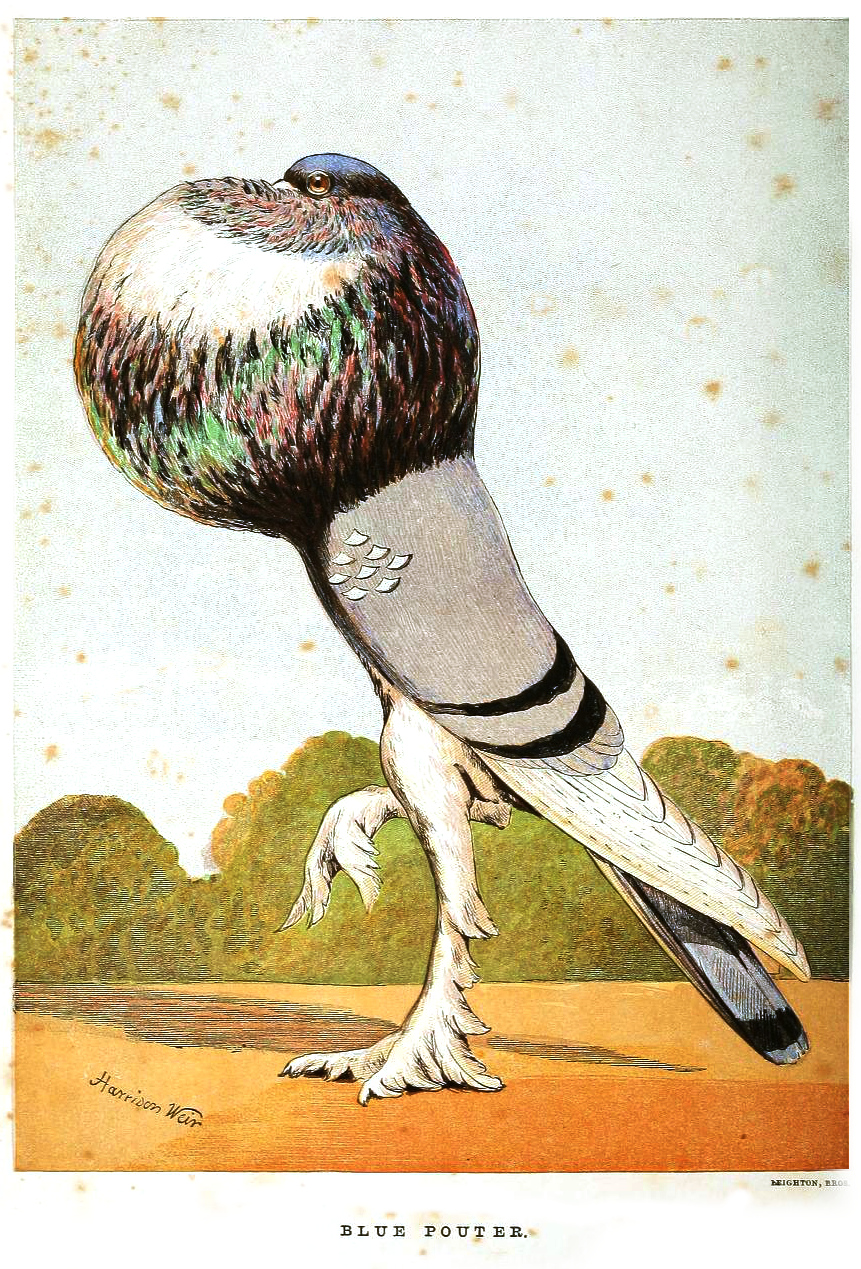
A blue pouter from the frontispiece of Pigeons (1868)

Around the 1840s, Tegetmeier took some interest in cockfights, writing about them in Colman's Magazine under the pen name of "T. Hornby". Around 1845 he worked briefly as a school teacher and in December of the same year he married Anne Edwards Stone who worked in the school associated with the Home and Colonial School Society college where he taught domestic economy. Their marriage led to their dismissal from their teaching posts but William was reinstated after a while. He wrote several textbooks for students including "Arithmetical tables", "Classification of Animals and Vegetables" and "First Lines of Botany". In 1851 he wrote "The Book of One Hundred Beverages" which included recipes for various non-alcoholic drinks.

The Tegetmeiers initially lived in a very small house on Drury Lane. They had a daughter Edith in 1847 followed by a son Egbert in 1852 after moving to Tottenham and in 1854 the family moved to Willesden and then Wood Green in 1855. Egbert became journalist and wrote on natural history and cycling for The Field. Two further daughters followed: Maria (in 1858) and Sara (1865); the latter married Edmund William Richardson, who subsequently became Tegetmeier's biographer.

Tegetmeier was interested in birds, especially fowl and pigeons, from a young age. He wrote several articles on these topics in the Cottage Gardener and wrote a book on Profitable Poultry. Finding that writing was successful, he began to write many other books including The Poultry Book (1867) and Pigeons (1868) which went through several editions with plates by Harrison Weir. He also wrote on ornamental pheasants and game birds. He often included sensory descriptions such as a description of the young capercaillie which he noted as "superior to that of the black game" although having a turpentine flavour from the leaves of Scotch fir that it fed on. Charles Darwin's interest in pigeon varieties led him through William Yarrell, for sometime the Tegetmeier's houseowner and a good friend, to Tegetmeier who eventually became a promoter of ideas on evolution. He moved from Wood Green to Fortis Green, near Muswell Hill in 1856.

== Experimentation and collaboration with Darwin ==
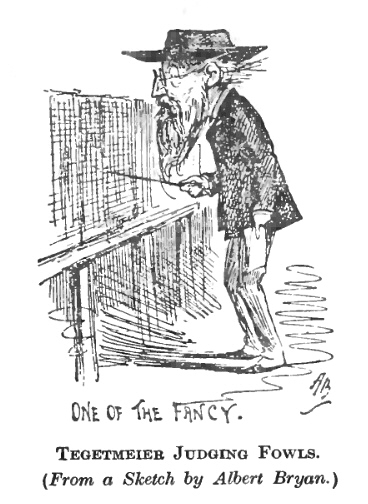
As a judge of poultry breeds

Around the time that he moved to live in Muswell Hill, he took a keen interest in bee keeping, and discovered how bees created the hexagon-shaped cells in their hives. He set up an experimental bee house for the Apiarian Society of London for which he was the honorary secretary. He conducted a number of experiments and estimated that bees needed 12-15 lbs of sugar to produce a pound of wax. Along with Darwin he conducted experiments involving the application of colour dyes to wax to determine that bees attempted to form cylindrical cells that were altered to a hexagonal form by their attempts to economize on wax. Darwin also had Tegetmeier repeat some of his experiments on breeding different varieties of pigeons and fowl to see if their offspring were fertile. Tegetmeier was elected a Fellow of the Zoological Society, a member of the British Ornithologists’ Union from 1837 and he became the natural history editor of The Field magazine.

== Poultry, livestock and later life ==
One of Tegetmeier's major works was the Poultry Book (1867) in which he sought to cover all the known breeds of domestic fowl. As an expert on poultry breeding, he was routinely called to judge breeds at poultry exhibitions. He gained a reputation as a strict judge and came to be known as "Teggy the fighter." Tegetmeier's work with homing pigeons led to the establishment of military pigeon posts and their use in war time before the advent of telegraphy. A secretary of the Philoperisteron Society, he was the first to organize pigeon races. He also took an interest in the use of mules in the army. Tegetmeier considered himself a practical and economically minded naturalist. Along with Eleanor Ormerod, he considered the house sparrow to be a pest and supported measures for its control. He revised the work of F.O. Morris, A natural history of the nests and eggs of British birds (1897). He claimed that all humans had an instinct for collection, noting that they ranged from the "untutored savage who collects beads and coloured rags to the most civilised connoisseur of the highest works of art."

Around 1882, he was regular writer for The Queen, a women's weekly. He was a Tory and opposed campaigns for women's rights and suffrage.

He died at Golders Green and was buried in St. Marylebone cemetery in East Finchley. He had four daughters and a son. At the time of his death, he was the oldest founding member of the Savage Club. He also acted in some of the Savage Club's amateur theatre presentations. He was a collector of fine books.

A green heritage plaque was installed on the house where he had lived at 101 St James's Lane, Muswell Hill in 2008.
