= American Standard of Perfection =

Poultry breed standards for the United States

The cover of the 1930 edition

The American Standard of Perfection is the official book of breed standards of the American Poultry Association. It classifies and describes the standard physical appearance, coloring and temperament for many breeds of poultry recognized in the United States, including chickens, ducks, turkeys, geese, and guinea fowl, but not pigeons.

The earliest book of breed standards for the poultry fancy in North America was published in 1867 as the Standard of Excellence, under the auspices of the American Poultry Society; the first such work to be published by the American Poultry Association – which was constituted in 1873/1874 – was the American Standard of Excellence in 1874.

== History ==
The first book of breed standards for the poultry fancy in North America was the Standard of Excellence, published in 1867 under the auspices of the American Poultry Society. The full title was The Standard of Excellence as adopted by the American Poultry Society, being a reprint of the same as compiled and adopted by the London Poultry Club, with alterations and additions, adapting it to America. It was a reprint – with modifications – of The Standard of Excellence in Exhibition Poultry, authorized by the Poultry Club edited by William Bernhardt Tegetmeier, published in London in 1865, and later included as an appendix to The Poultry Book by the same author, published in London in 1867.

The first edition to be published by the American Poultry Association – which was constituted in 1873/1874 – was the American Standard of Excellence in 1874. Further and expanded editions appeared in 1875 and 1878. An illustrated edition, with drawings of the outlines of twenty birds, was published in 1888, but was later withdrawn.

In 1902 the first American Standard of Perfection was published, edited by J.H. Drevenstedt. The full title was The American Standard of Perfection, as adopted by the Association, at its twenty-second annual meeting, at Boston, Massachusetts, 1898. Containing a Complete Description of all the Recognized Varieties of Fowls.

== Classes ==
Nineteen classes of poultry are recognized by the American Poultry Association. Eleven are for chickens, of which six are for standard fowl and five for bantams. There are four classes of ducks and three classes of geese, each divided by weight. Turkeys and guinea fowl each form a single class.

- Standard fowl: American, Asiatic, Continental, English, Mediterranean and All Other Standard Breeds
- Bantam: single comb clean legged, rose comb clean legged, all other comb clean legged, feather legged, game bantam
- Ducks: heavy, medium, light, bantam
- Geese: heavy, medium, light.

== See also ==
- List of chicken breeds
- List of goose breeds
- List of duck breeds
- List of turkey breeds
