= American Poultry Association =

Organization

- Formation: 1873
- Location: PO Box 306 Burgettstown, PA
- Region served: U.S. & Canada
- President: Norma Padgett
- Affiliations: American Poultry Association
- Website: amerpoultryassn.com

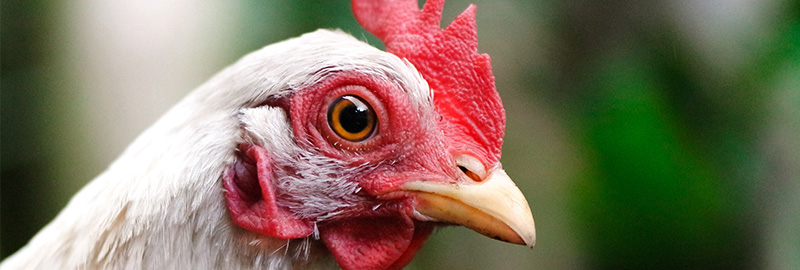
Chicken

The American Poultry Association (APA) is the oldest poultry organization in North America. It was founded in 1873, and incorporated in Indiana in 1932.

The first American poultry show was held in 1849, and the APA was later formed in response to the burgeoning need for an overseeing body to set standards for poultry breeds and to administer judging. A year after its foundation, the Association published the first American Standard of Perfection, which to this day is the most widely used and respected handbook on poultry breed standards. The APA continues to publish and expand the Standard, and aims to promote all aspects of poultry fancy by certifying official judges, sponsoring shows, fostering youth participation, and advocating for its members, in both the U.S. and Canada.

== The Poultry Standard of Perfection ==
Once the APA was formed in 1873, they made it their first order of business to create a standard for American poultry breeds. Six members from the original meeting came together to develop the first Standard of Excellence. It was adopted at the January 15, 1874 meeting in Buffalo, New York, as the official guidebook for poultry judging in North America.

The first Standard described 46 breeds, some with multiple varieties, in its 102 pages. It was (and still is) the bible of standard bred poultry for breeders and judges. The next edition, in January, 1875, the Standard was expanded to 243 pages, encompassing 79 breeds and varieties. In 1888, they changed the name to the Standard of Perfection as requested by Mr. H. H. Stoddard. The idea behind the change came from the fact that there could be many degrees of excellence in various birds, while the specifications in their book described a bird which reached perfection.

== See also ==
- Breed registry
- Chicken breeds recognized by the American Poultry Association
- Poultry Club of Great Britain
