= Poultry Club of Great Britain =

British registered charity

- Formation: 1877
- Type: Registered charity
- Purpose: Conservation of poultry breeds
- Official language: English
- Patron: Charles III
- Key people: Lee Grant, president; Colin Booth, chair; Paul Kerfoot, vice chair
- Affiliations: Entente Européenne
- Website: poultryclub.org

The Poultry Club of Great Britain is a registered charity founded in 1877. Its stated purpose is to "safeguard the interests of all pure and traditional breeds of poultry including chickens, bantams, ducks, geese and turkeys".

The club maintains the British Poultry Standard and acts as the overseeing body for all poultry breed clubs in Great Britain and Northern Ireland. It is also responsible for organizing the annual National Poultry Show.

The club donated to The Museum of English Rural Life David Scrivener's collection of printed materials related to the breeding and keeping of poultry.

== See also ==
- American Poultry Association
- Rare Poultry Society
