= List of Italian chicken breeds =

This is an incomplete list of chicken breeds considered in Italy to be wholly or partly of Italian origin. Some may have complex or obscure histories, so inclusion here does not necessarily imply that a breed is predominantly or exclusively Italian.

- Ancona
- Bianca di Saluzzo
- Bionda Piemontese
- Ciuffine Ghigi
- Collo Nudo Italiano
- Ermellinata di Rovigo
- Italiana
- Livorno
- Mericanel della Brianza
- Millefiori di Lonigo
- Millefiori Piemontese
- Modenese
- Mugellese
- Padovana
- Padovana Riccia
- Pépoi
- Polverara
- Robusta Lionata
- Robusta Maculata
- Romagnola
- Siciliana
- Valdarno
- Valdarnese
