= Saccisica =

Area in the province of Padova, Veneto region in Italy

Coordinates: 45°16′N 12°03′E

The Saccisica, sometimes also called the Piovese, is a historic area in Italy, consisting of the comuni of Arzergrande, Brugine, Codevigo, Correzzola, Legnaro, Piove di Sacco, Polverara, Pontelongo and Sant'Angelo di Piove di Sacco. It has an area of 253 square kilometres (98 sq mi) and a population of 54,000. It lies in the south-eastern part of the province of Padova. The Fiumicello, the Schilla, the Bacchiglione, the Paltana, the Barbegara, the Brenta and the Taglio Nuovissimo flow through it. It was an agricultural area; both its economy and its geography have been altered by the growth of commercial and industrial activity in recent decades.
