= Ermellinata di Rovigo =

Italian breed of chicken

- Conservation status: FAO (2007): not listed; DAD-IS (2025): at risk/endangered
- Country of origin: Italy
- Use: dual-purpose breed

Traits
- Weight: Male: 3.4–3.9 kg; Female: 2.6–3.1 kg
- Skin colour: Yellow
- Egg colour: pinkish-brown to brown
- Comb type: single

Classification
- Chicken; Gallus gallus domesticus

The Ermellinata di Rovigo is a modern Italian breed of dual-purpose chicken. It originates in the city of Rovigo in the Veneto region of north-eastern Italy, from which it takes its name. It was created between 1959 and 1965, principally from Sussex and Rhode Island Red parentage.

== History ==
The Ermellinata di Rovigo was created between 1959 and 1965 at the Stazione Sperimentale di Pollicoltura, or experimental chicken breeding centre, of Rovigo, in the Veneto. It was conceived as a dual-purpose breed, and based on Rhode Island Red and Sussex stock. It broadly resembles a Light Sussex, with the difference that it has yellow skin and legs, which are traditionally preferred by Italian consumers of chicken meat.

A standard for the breed was published by the now-defunct Associazione Nazionale Allevatori Specie Avicole ('national association of poultry breeders') in the latter part of the twentieth century, and is published for historic interest on the website of the Federazione Italiana Associazioni Avicole, the federation of Italian poultry associations, the authority governing poultry breeding in Italy. In early 2012, the breed was not officially recognised by the FIAV.

Together with the Pépoi, the Robusta lionata, the Robusta maculata and the Padovana, the Ermellinata di Rovigo is one of the five chicken breeds included in the CO.VA. project of Veneto Agricultura, the regional administration for agriculture of the Veneto. The project includes among its aims the conservation of local avian species of limited distribution, and the conservation of genetic resources and biodiversity, and has published a detailed description of the breed.

Breed numbers remain low. A study published in 2007 used a figure of approximately 500 for the total breeding stock, of which about 100 were cocks.

== Characteristics ==
According to the old ANSAV standard, the Ermellinata di Rovigo is white with typical "ermine" markings – black neck hackles, wing-tips and tail; that is, it has the same Columbian colour pattern as the Light Sussex. The skin and legs are yellow, the ear-lobes are red. The comb is single and large, with 5–6 points. Weights are in the range 3.4–3.9 kg (7–9 lb) for cocks, 2.6–3.1 kg (6–7 lb) for hens.

The eggs are pinkish brown and weigh 55–60 g.

== Uses ==
The Ermellinata di Rovigo is a dual-purpose breed. Hens lay 170–190 eggs per year. In meat production, birds reach a weight of 1.7–1.8 kg in 120 days.

Cross-breeding buff Livorno cocks with Ermellinata di Rovigo hens produces an auto-sexing hybrid, with ermine-silver males suitable as spring chicken, and buff hens of light to medium weight that are good layers of ivory-pink eggs. Another auto-sexing hybrid is obtained by cross-breeding with New Hampshire cocks, which produces fast-growing ermine-coloured cockerels, and medium-weight red layers of salmon-brown eggs.
