= Romagnola (disambiguation) =

Romagnola can refer two different animals:

- Romagnola, a type of cattle in Italy
- Romagnola chicken, a type of chicken using the same name
