= Robusta Lionata =

Italian breed of chicken

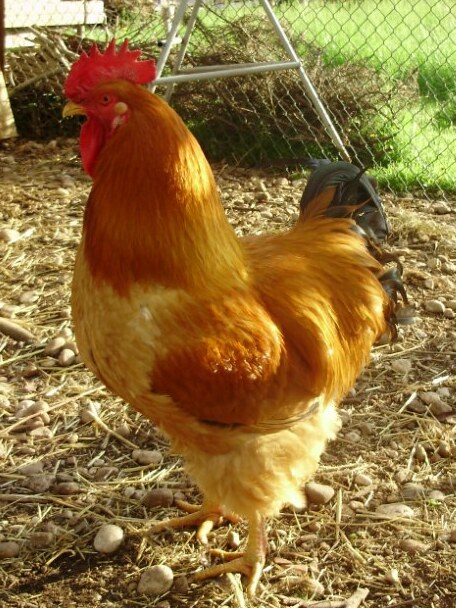
- Cock bird
- Conservation status: recovering
- Country of origin: Italy
- Use: dual-purpose breed

Traits
- Weight: Male: 3.8–4.2 kg (8.5–9.5 lb); Female: 2.8–3.0 kg (6–6.5 lb)
- Skin colour: yellow
- Egg colour: pinkish brown
- Comb type: single

Classification
- Chicken; Gallus gallus domesticus

The Robusta Lionata is a modern Italian breed of dual-purpose chicken originating in the city of Rovigo in the Veneto region of north-eastern Italy. It was created between 1959 and 1965, by cross-breeding Buff Orpingtons with the commercial strain known in Italy as "White America".

== History ==
The Robusta Lionata was created between 1959 and 1965 at the Stazione Sperimentale di Pollicoltura, or experimental chicken breeding centre, of Rovigo, in the Veneto. It was conceived as a dual-purpose breed, and derived from crossing the Buff Orpington with a commercial strain widely raised in Veneto in the twentieth century, known in Italy as "White America". The White America is believed to have been based on mutant white Barnevelders, with contributions from White Leghorn, Rhode Island White and White Rock stock; in early 2012 it was no longer considered a breed.

A standard for the Robusta Lionata was published by the now defunct Associazione Nazionale Allevatori Specie Avicole, or national association of breeders of avian species, in the latter part of the twentieth century, and is published for historic interest on the website of the Federazione Italiana Associazioni Avicole, the federation of Italian poultry associations, the authority governing poultry breeding in Italy. In early 2012, the breed was not officially recognised by the FIAV.

Together with the Pépoi, the Ermellinata di Rovigo, the Robusta Maculata and the Padovana, the Robusta Lionata is one of the five chicken breeds included in the CO.VA. project of Veneto Agricultura, the regional administration for agriculture of the Veneto. The project includes among its aims the conservation of local avian species of limited distribution, and the conservation of genetic resources and biodiversity, and has published a detailed description of the breed.

Breed numbers remain low. A study published in 2007 used a figure of approximately 700 for the total breeding stock, of which approximately 200 were cocks.

== Characteristics ==
The Robusta Lionata broadly resembles a Buff Orpington, with the difference that it has yellow skin and legs, which are traditionally preferred by Italian consumers of chicken meat.

According to the old ANSAV standard, the Robusta Lionata is a warm buff colour. The tail and wing-tips are black with dark green lights. The skin and legs are yellow, the ear-lobes are red. The comb is single and medium-large, with five or six points. Average weight is 3.8–4.2 kg for cocks, 2.8–3.0 kg for hens. The more recent description by Veneto Agricultura gives greater weights: 4.0–4.5 kg for cocks and 2.8–3.3 kg for hens.

== Use ==
The Robusta Lionata is a dual-purpose breed. Hens lay 160–170 eggs per year; the eggs are salmon-coloured and weigh 55 g or more. In meat production, birds reach a slaughter weight of some 1.9–2.0 kg in four months.

Cross-breeding Robusta Lionata cocks with Barred Plymouth Rock hens produces an auto-sexing first-generation hybrid.
