= Polverara chicken =

Italian breed of chicken

Polverara
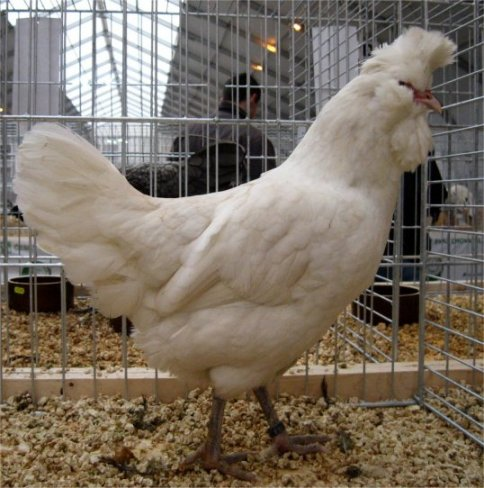
- A hen
- Conservation status: recovering
- Other names: Schiatta; S'ciata
- Country of origin: Italy
- Distribution: Province of Padova

Traits
- Weight: Male: 2.5–2.8 kg; Female: 1.8–2.1 kg
- Skin colour: white
- Egg colour: whitish
- Comb type: v-shaped

Classification

Notes
- crested breed
- Chicken; Gallus gallus domesticus

The Polverara, also known as Schiatta (Italian) or S'ciata (Venetian), is an ancient breed of crested chicken from the area of Polverara in the province of Padova, in the Veneto region of north-eastern Italy.

== History ==
The Polverara chicken takes its name from Polverara, a small town in the rural Saccisica area of the province of Padova. The early history of the Polverara breed is unclear, as is its relationship to the Padovana. The Polverara is a larger breed, with a smaller crest and beard. It has been suggested both that it derives from the Padovana, and that the Padovana derives from it.

Two sources provide evidence of crested chickens in Europe in Roman times: the two marble statuettes of crested chickens noticed in the Sala degli Animali ("animal hall") of the Vatican Museums in 1927 by Alessandro Ghigi date from the first or second century AD; a chicken skull excavated at West Hill, Uley, Gloucestershire in England shows the typical cerebral hernia of the crested breeds and dates from the 4th century.

The first reference to the chickens of Polverara is from Bernardino Scardeone (1478–1554), who writes of the Saccisica: "this area is ... famous for the abundance of chickens of remarkable size, particularly in the village of Polverara". Alessandro Tassoni (1565–1635), in his mock-heroic poem La Secchia Rapita ("The Stolen Bucket", 1622) speaks of "... Polverara, which is the kingdom of cocks".

A painting by Giovanni Agostino Cassana (1658–1720) in the Musei Civici degli Eremitani, the city museums of Padova, shows a woman spinning thread in a rural landscape, surrounded by a number of domestic animals, including a crested white hen that closely resembles the Polverara breed.

By the late nineteenth century a decline in the breed, attributed to inter-breeding with other chickens, was already apparent. Despite various attempts by breeders to preserve it, and the institution by the comune of Polverara in 1925 of an annual prize of 300 lire to be awarded to the best breeder, the Polverara chicken declined through most of the 20th century. A rustic breed that adapted poorly to intensive farming, its numbers fell until only seven remained. From the 1980s, new efforts were made to recover and reconstitute it. It was included in the 1996 official standard of the Federazione Italiana Associazioni Avicole, the federation of Italian poultry associations, which is the authority governing poultry breeding in Italy. It is under the protection of the European Community.

Breed numbers remain low. A study published in 2007 used a figure of approximately 1200 for the total breeding stock, of which approximately 300 were cocks.

== Characteristics ==
Two colours are recognised for the Polverara, black and white. The black variety is deep black with strong dark green lights; the legs are a greenish slate colour, and the beak dark with black lines. The white variety is pure white, with willow-green legs and pinkish yellow beak. The skin is white. The crest is small and upward-facing, the comb small and V-shaped. The wattles are small, the ear-lobes of medium size and pure white. Average weight is 2.5–2.8 kg (5.5–6.2 lb) for cocks, 1.8–2.1 kg (4.0–4.6 lb) for hens. The eggs are whitish and weigh at least 50 g. Ring size is 18 mm for cocks, 16 mm for hens.

== Use ==
The Polverara is a dual-purpose breed. It is kept in the open as it adapts poorly to captivity, and may roost in trees where available. Cocks easily reach 3 kg in weight. Hens lay at least 150 eggs a year. The meat is darker than in some other breeds, and is delicate and well-flavoured.
