= Sussex chicken =

British breed of chicken

Sussex
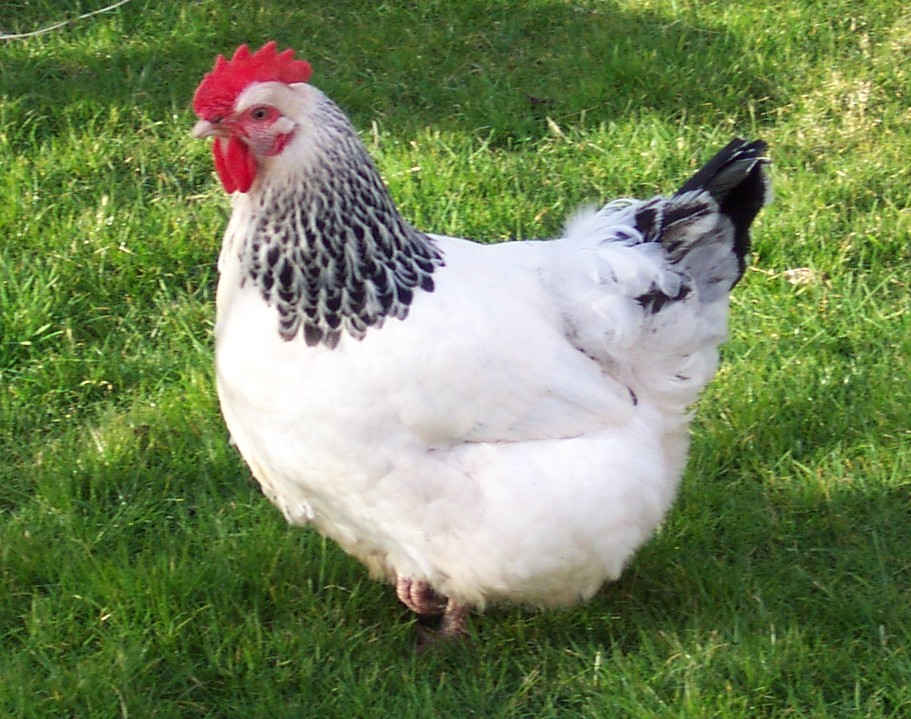
- Light hen
- Conservation status: FAO (2007): not at risk
- Country of origin: United Kingdom
- Use: dual-purpose, eggs and meat

Traits
- Weight: Male: Standard: minimum 4.1 kg Bantam: maximum 1.5 kg; Female: Standard: minimum 3.2 kg Bantam: maximum 1.1 kg
- Skin colour: white
- Egg colour: tinted
- Comb type: single

Classification
- APA: English
- EE: yes
- PCGB: heavy, soft feather
- Chicken; Gallus gallus domesticus

The Sussex is a British breed of dual-purpose chicken, reared both for its meat and for its eggs. Eight colours are recognised for both standard-sized and bantam fowl. A breed association, the Sussex Breed Club, was organised in 1903.

== History ==
The Sussex originates in the historic county of Sussex, in south-east England. It is among the oldest of British chicken breeds: birds described as "Old Sussex or Kent Fowl" were shown at the first poultry show at London Zoo in 1845. The Sussex was not included in the first poultry standard, the Standard of Excellence in Exhibition Poultry of William Bernhardt Tegetmeier, in 1865. The breed standard for the Sussex was drawn up in 1902, with three colour varieties, the light, the red and the speckled. Of these, the speckled was the oldest. The development of the light variety was probably influenced by Oriental breeds such as the Brahma and Cochin, and also by the silver-grey Dorking. The red was originally black-breasted; it and the brown may have been influenced by Indian Game. The buff variety appeared in the 1920s, and was followed by the white, a sport from the light. The most recent variety is the silver.

In the early part of the twentieth century, until the advent of commercial hybrid strains at about the time of the Second World War, the Sussex and the Rhode Island Red were the two principal meat breeds in the United Kingdom. Utility strains of the Sussex developed, with better productive capabilities but smaller and less well marked than was expected for exhibition purposes.

== Characteristics ==
The Sussex chicken is graceful with a long, broad, flat back; a long and straight breastbone; wide shoulders; and a rectangular build. The tail is held at a 45-degree angle from the body. The eyes are red in the darker varieties but orange in the lighter ones. The comb is single. The earlobes are red and the legs and skin white in every variety. Cocks weigh approximately 4.1 kg and hens about 3.2 kg.

Eight colour varieties are recognised by the Poultry Club of Great Britain: brown, buff, coronation, light, red, silver, speckled and white. The light Sussex has a white body with a black tail and black in the flight feathers and wing coverts; the neck hackles are white with black striping. The buff has the same markings, but with greenish-black on a golden-buff ground. The silver is similar to the light, but has grey thighs and a dark breast with silver lacing. The red has the same markings as the light, but the base colour is a rich dark red throughout. The speckled is a rich dark mahogany colour, each feather with a black dot and white tip. The white is pure white throughout.

The coronation Sussex has the same markings as the light, but with lavender instead of the black. It was created for the coronation of Edward VIII – an event which never took place – and had disappeared by about the time of the Second World War. It was thought to have the same red, white and blue colours as the Union Flag. A coronation bantam was re-created in the 1980s.

The American Poultry Association recognises three colours: light, red and speckled. The red and speckled were added to the Standard of Perfection in 1914, and the light in 1929.

== Use ==
The Sussex was traditionally reared as a table bird, for meat production. In the early part of the twentieth century, it was one of the principal breeds kept for this purpose, until it was displaced by modern industrial hybrid lines. It may be kept as a dual-purpose bird. Hens lay some 180–200 tinted eggs per year; some layer strains may give up to 250. The eggs weigh about 60 g. The Sussex is also reared for showing.

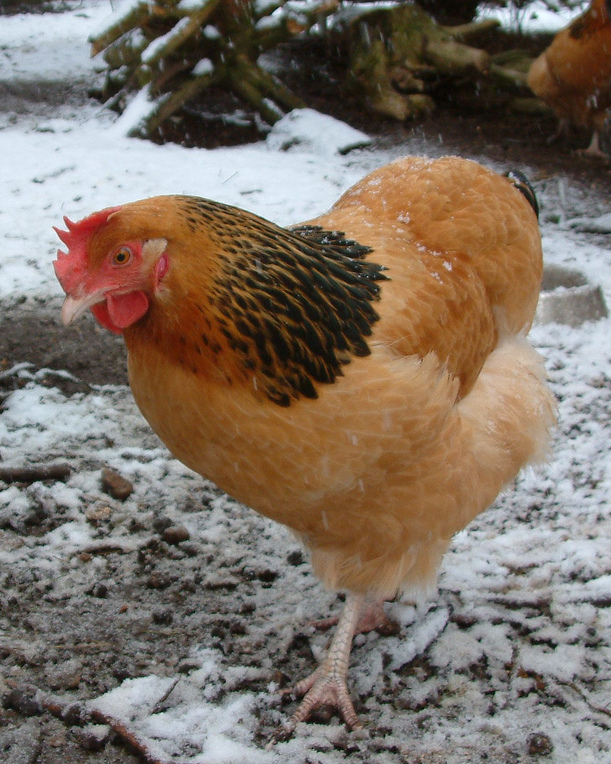
Buff hen in winter

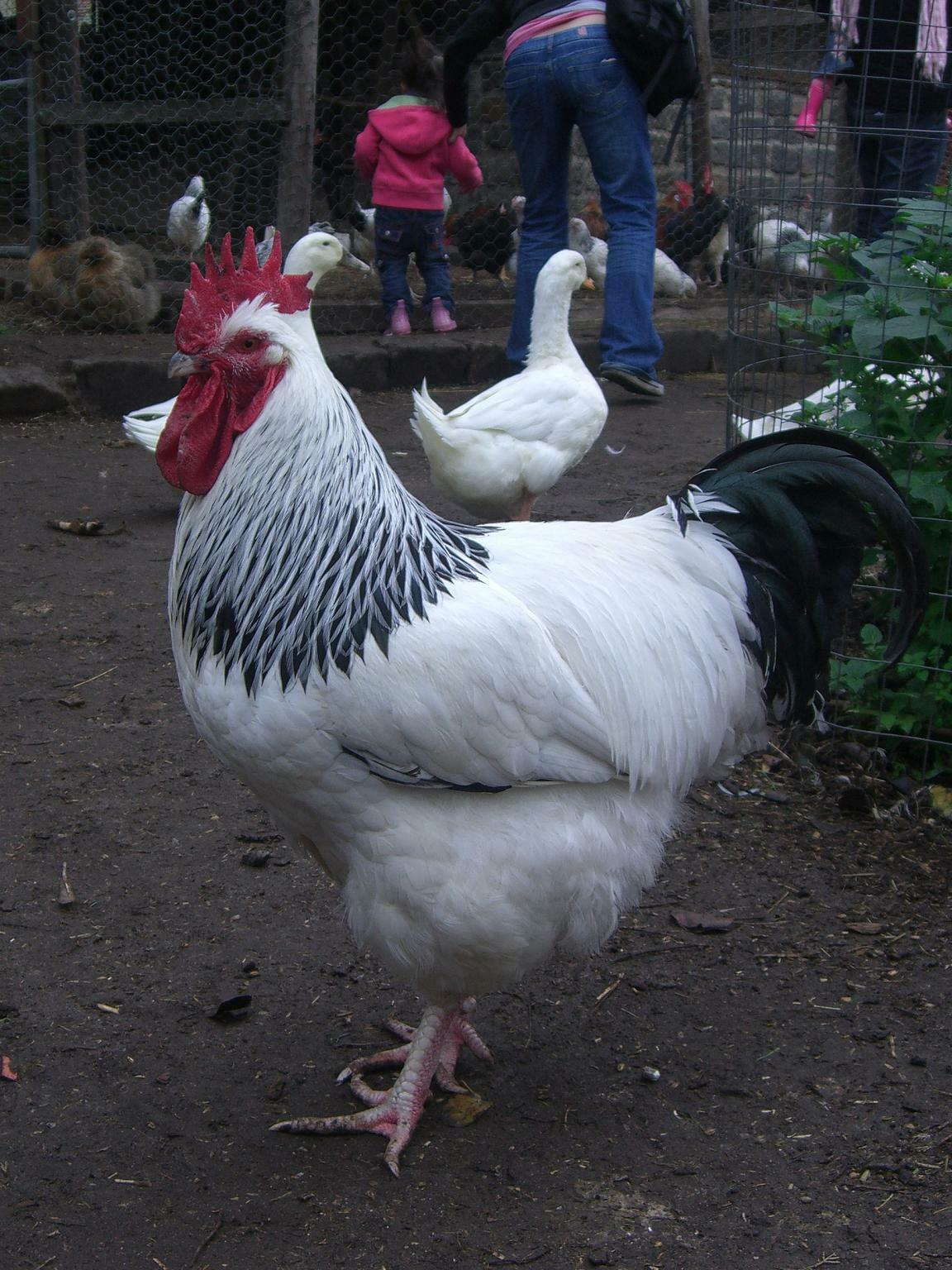
Light cock

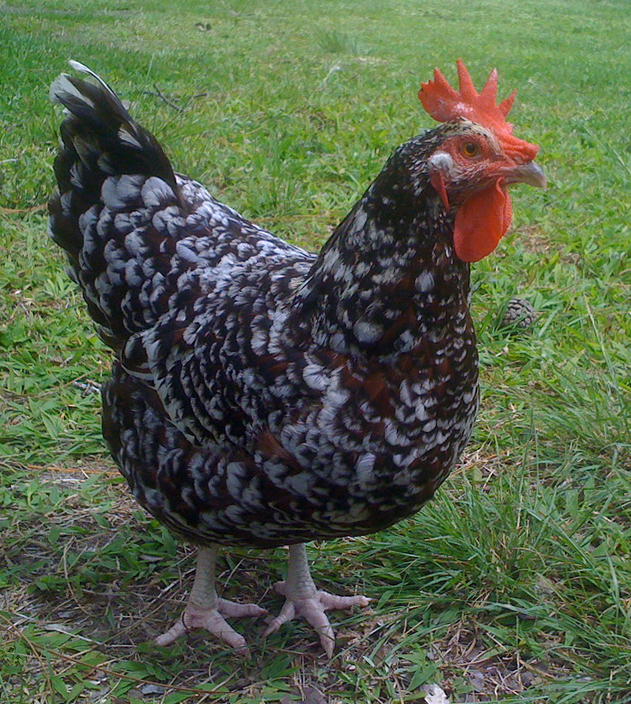
Speckled hen

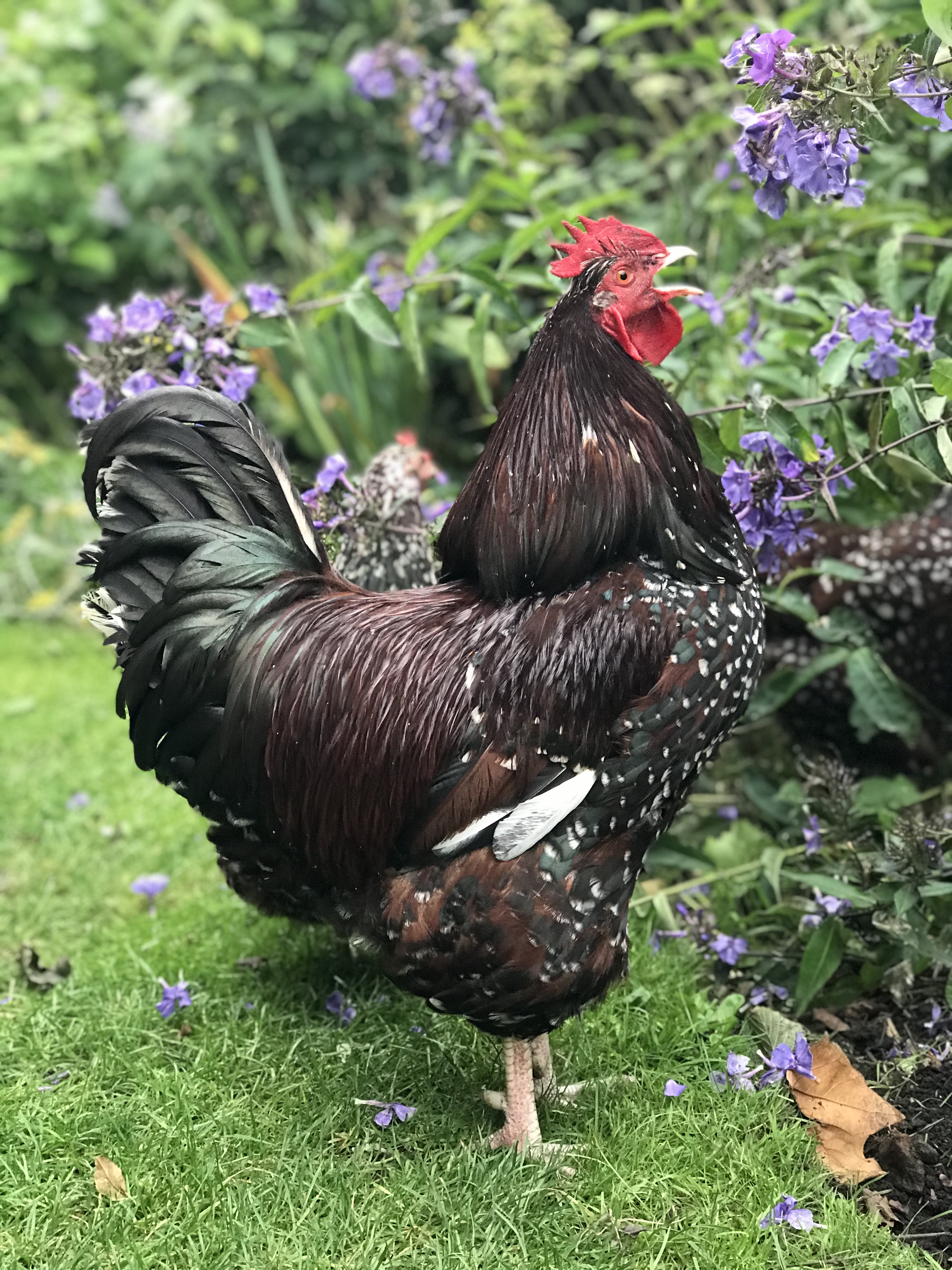
Speckled cock crowing

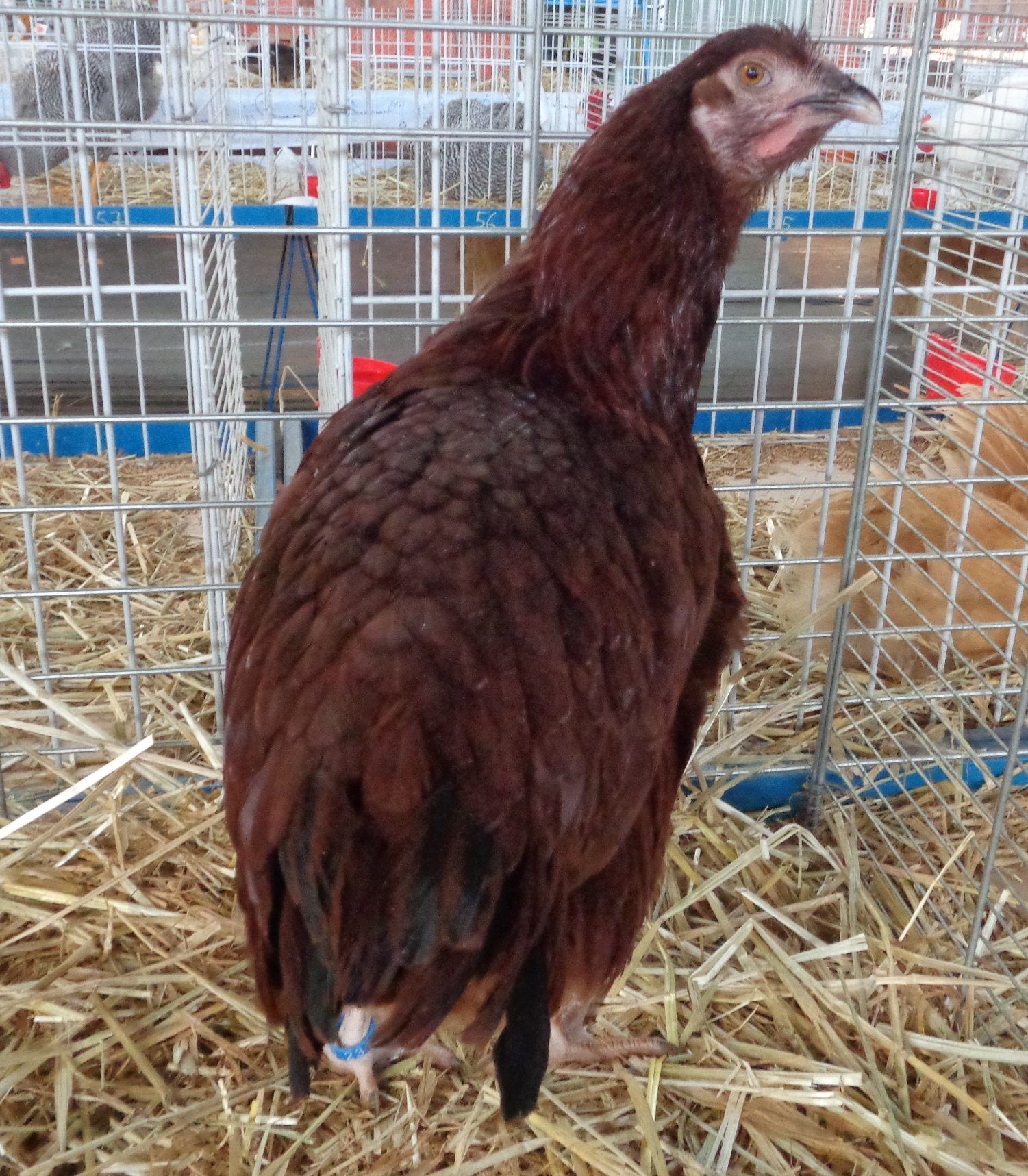
Red pullet

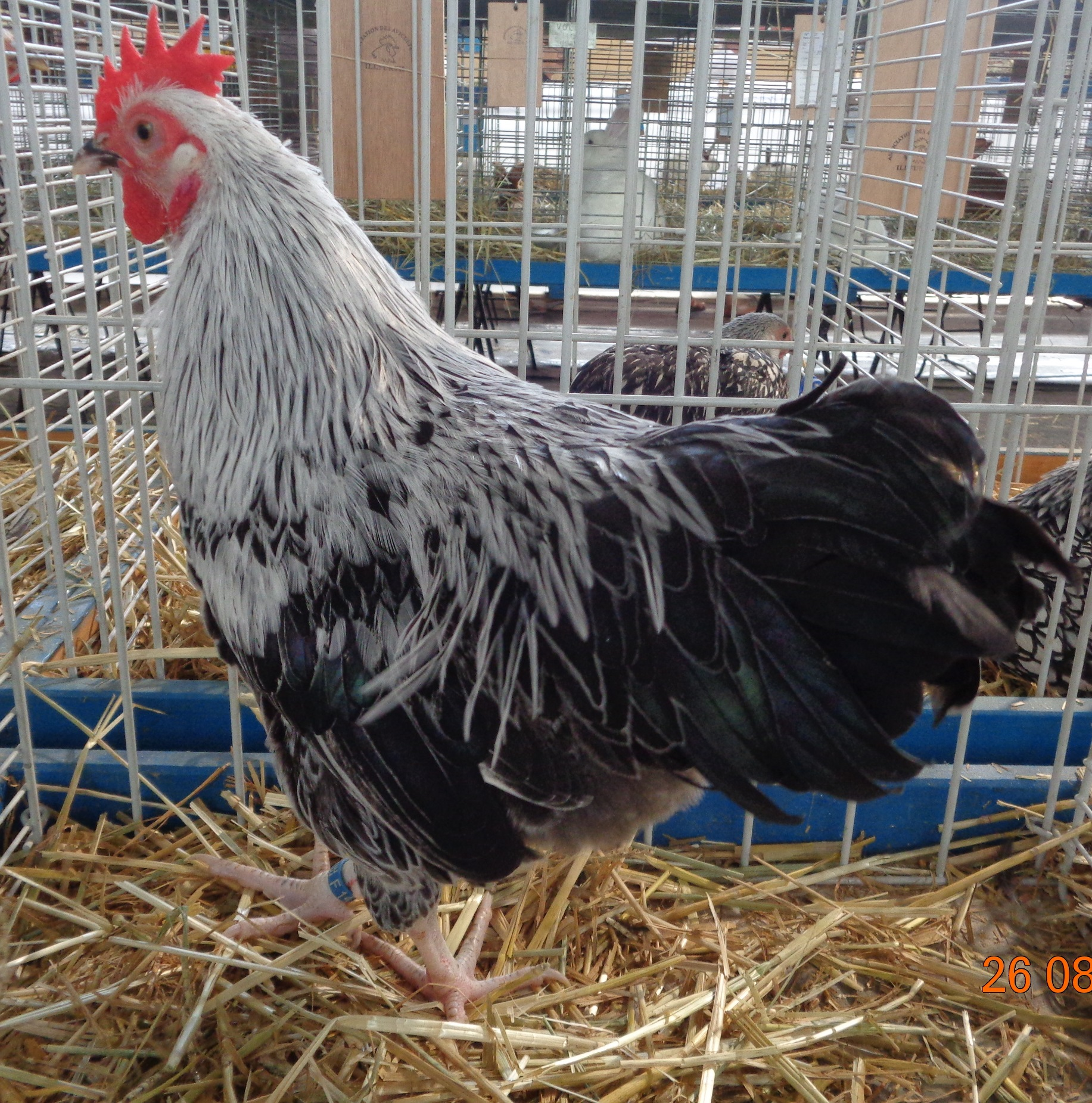
Silver bantam cockerel
