= Pépoi =

Italian breed of chicken

- Conservation status: recovering
- Other names: Pepoi
- Country of origin: Italy
- Use: dual-purpose breed

Traits
- Weight: Male: 1.3–1.5 kg (3–3.5 lb); Female: 1.0–1.1 kg (2–2.5 lb)
- Skin colour: yellow
- Egg colour: pinkish brown
- Comb type: single

Classification
- Chicken; Gallus gallus domesticus

The Pépoi or Pepoi is a rustic Italian breed of small dual-purpose chicken from north-eastern Italy, particularly the Veneto and Friuli-Venezia Giulia regions. It is not officially recognised as a breed in Italy, but is being considered for recognition.

== History ==
The Pépoi is a traditional farmhouse breed of north-eastern Italy, and of Friuli-Venezia Giulia and the north-eastern part of the Veneto in particular. It is one of the few true bantam breeds in Italy, others being the Mericanel della Brianza and the Mugellese.

Together with the Ermellinata di Rovigo, the Robusta Lionata, the Robusta Maculata and the Padovana, the Pépoi is one of the five chicken breeds included in the CO.VA. project of Veneto Agricultura, the regional administration for agriculture of the Veneto. The project includes among its aims the conservation of local avian species of limited distribution, and the conservation of genetic resources and biodiversity, and has published a detailed description of the breed.

In early 2012, the Pépoi was not officially recognised by the Federazione Italiana Associazioni Avicole, but was under consideration. Critics have suggested that the characteristics of the Pépoi are too variable for it to be considered a breed.

Breed numbers remain low. A study published in 2007 used a figure of approximately 550 for the total breeding stock, of which approximately 50 were cocks.

== Characteristics ==
The colouring of the Pépoi is golden (partridge). The skin and legs are yellow. Average weight is 1.3–1.5 kg for cocks, 1.0–1.1 kg for hens.

== Uses ==
The Pépoi is a dual-purpose breed. Hens lay 160–180 eggs per year; the eggs are pinkish brown and weigh 40–45 g. In meat production, birds reach a weight of 600–700 g in four months, and are suitable as a single portion or for the spit. The meat is well-flavoured.
