= Sicilian Buttercup =

International breed of chicken

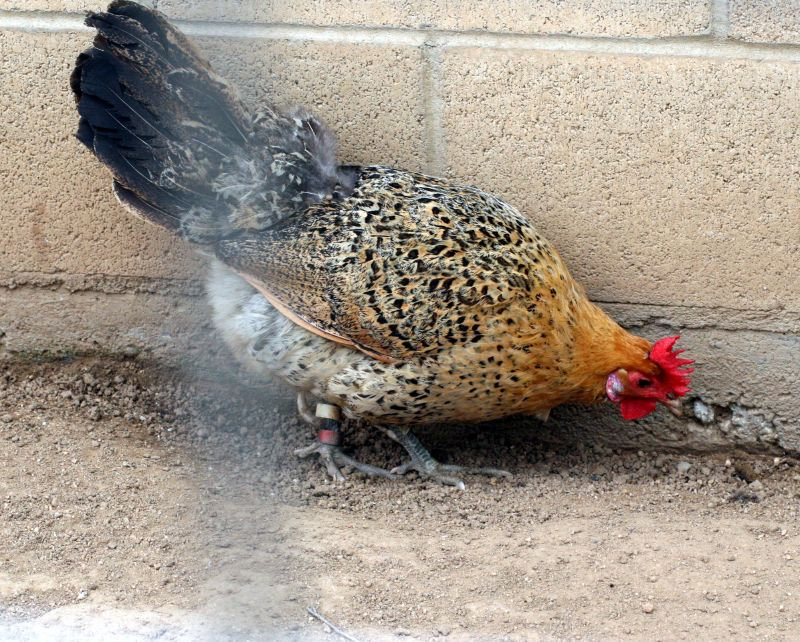
- A hen
- Conservation status: FAO (2007): not at risk; TLC (2026): threatened; RBST (2026): priority; DAD-IS (2026): at risk
- Other names: Buttercup
- Distribution: Ireland; New Zealand; United Kingdom; United States

Traits
- Weight: Male: 2.95 kg; Female: 2.50 kg
- Comb type: Buttercup comb

Classification
- APA: Mediterranean
- PCGB: rare soft feather: light
- Chicken; Gallus gallus domesticus

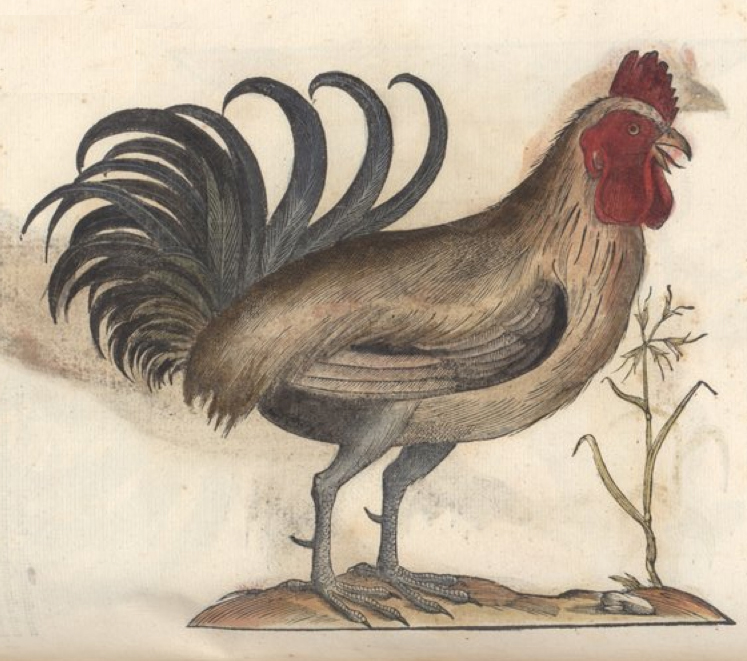
Gallus turcicus, from the Ornithologiae tomus alter of Ulisse Aldrovandi (1522–1605)

Educational slide, Canada, 1920s

The Sicilian Buttercup is an international breed of chicken originating from the island of Sicily. It derives from the indigenous Siciliana breed of the island, of which birds were exported to the United States in the nineteenth century, and to Britain and Australia early in the twentieth century; long separation has led to marked differences from the original stock.

== History ==
The indigenous Siciliana breed of Sicily appears to derive from ancient inter-breeding of local birds with North African stock such as the rose-combed Berbera breed or the Tripolitana described by Tucci. These birds may have been similar to the "Gallus turcicus" described by Ulisse Aldrovandi in 1600. Similar chickens are depicted in sixteenth-century paintings in the Vatican Museums and the Galleria Borghese in Rome, and in Florence and Paris.

In about 1863 or 1877, a certain Cephas Dawes of Dedham, Massachusetts, captain of the Frutiere, was loading oranges in Sicily and bought a number of chickens to provide meat on his homeward journey. Some of these continued to lay well during the voyage, and were kept for eggs instead. Some of them were later sold to one C. Carroll Loring, also of Dedham, who became the first breeder of what would later become the Sicilian Buttercup. All American Buttercups, however, descend from a later shipment of hatchlings, in 1892.

A breeders' association – the American Buttercup Club – was formed the United States in 1912, and by 1914 had 600 members; a similar association formed in Britain in 1913. The Sicilian Buttercup was included in the Standard of Perfection of the American Poultry Association in 1918. It is an endangered breed: in 2026 it was listed as 'threatened' by the American Livestock Conservancy, as 'priority' by the British Rare Breeds Survival Trust, and as 'at risk' in the DAD-IS database of the Food and Agriculture Organization of the United Nations.
