= Mericanel della Brianza =

Italian breed of chicken

- Conservation status: recovering
- Country of origin: Italy
- Distribution: Lombardy

Traits
- Weight: Male: 0.7–0.8 kg; Female: 0.6–0.7 kg
- Skin colour: yellow
- Egg colour: cream to light brown
- Comb type: single

Classification
- Chicken; Gallus gallus domesticus

The Mericanel della Brianza is an Italian breed of small chicken or bantam from Lombardy, in northern Italy. It takes its name from the Brianza, an area to the north-east of Milan, and from mericanell, a Lombard diminutive of merican "American". In early 2012 it was the only officially recognised Italian bantam breed.

== History ==
The Mericanel della Brianza is named after the Brianza, a hilly geographical area which extends to the north and north-east of Milan, in the provinces of Monza e della Brianza, Lecco and Como, with a small part of the province of Milan. It is one of the few dwarf or bantam breeds in Italy, others being the Mugellese and the Pépoi.

The Mericanel della Brianza is a traditional chicken breed of Lombardy, and was apparently selectively bred from local dwarf strains in the early 1900s. Recent attention from breeders has led to a phase of recognition, selection and recovery.

In early 2012, the Mericanel della Brianza was the only Italian bantam breed officially recognised by the Federazione Italiana Associazioni Avicole, the Italian federation of poultry breeders; the breed standard was approved in 1996.

Breed numbers remain low. A study published in 2007 used a figure of approximately 350 for the total breeding stock, of which approximately 50 were cocks.

== Characteristics ==
Eight colour varieties are recognised for the Mericanel della Brianza, including white, black, silver, gold, pyle and white-spotted black. The skin and legs are yellow. The comb is single, with five points and a pronounced rear lobe. The ear-lobes are red. Average weight is 0.7–0.8 kg for cocks, 0.6–0.7 kg for hens. The eggs vary from cream to light brown, and weigh approximately 35 g.
