= Piove di Sacco =

- Comune
- Comune di Piove di Sacco
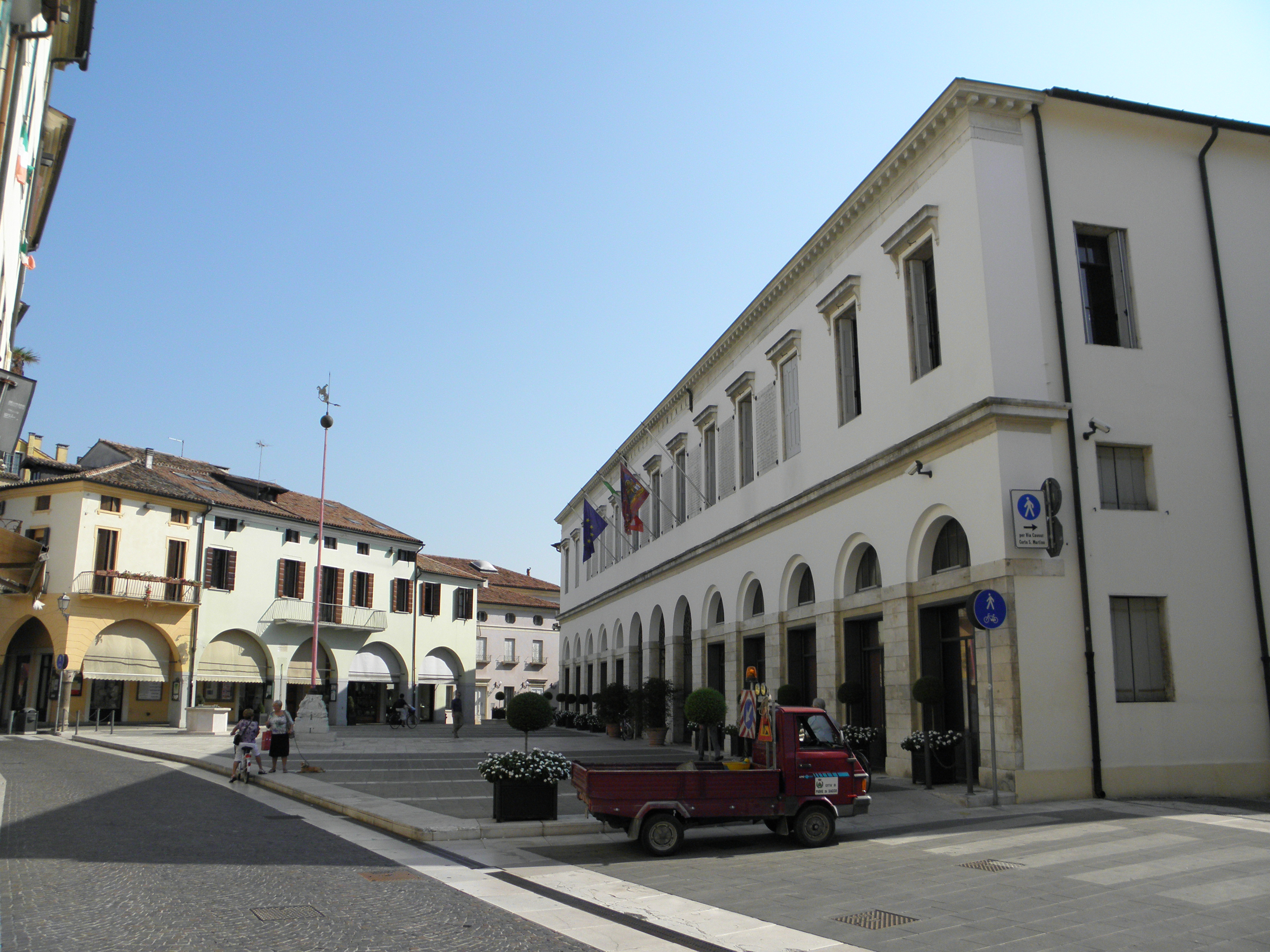
- Palazzo Jappelli, seat of the municipal office

- Coat of arms

- Location within Italy Location within Veneto
- Coordinates: 45°18′N 12°2′E
- Country: Italy
- Region: Veneto
- Province: Province of Padua (PD)
- Frazioni: Corte, Tognana, Arzerello, Piovega, S. Anna

Area
  - Total: 35.6 km^{2} (13.7 sq mi)

Population (Dec. 2004)
  - Total: 18,019
  - Density: 506/km^{2} (1,310/sq mi)
- Demonym: Piovesi
- Time zone: UTC+1 (CET)
  - Summer (DST): UTC+2 (CEST)
- Postal code: 35028
- Dialing code: 049

Piove di Sacco is a comune (municipality) in the Province of Padua in the Italian region Veneto, located about 25 kilometres (16 mi) southwest of Venice and about 20 kilometres (12 mi) southeast of Padua. As of 31 December 2004, it had a population of 18,019 and an area of 35.6 square kilometres (13.7 mi^{2}).

The municipality of Piove di Sacco contains the frazioni (subdivisions, mainly villages and hamlets) Corte, Tognana, Piovega and Arzerello.

Piove di Sacco borders the following municipalities: Arzergrande, Brugine, Campagna Lupia, Campolongo Maggiore, Codevigo, Pontelongo, Sant'Angelo di Piove di Sacco.

== Monuments and Places of Interest ==
Piove di Sacco boasts numerous architectural beauties, foremost among them being the Torre Carrarese, or the "great tower," the last remaining part of the fortifications built during the Carrarese period, on top of which the bell chamber of the nearby cathedral, dedicated to Saint Martin, has been added.

The cathedral itself is also very important, with its foundation dating back to the 10th century. It was later rebuilt between 1090 and 1100, and again in 1403, and was redesigned in neo-Romanesque and neo-Gothic styles by engineer Francesco Gasparini between 1893 and 1903. Several important works adorn the interior of the cathedral, including the altarpiece Madonna del Carmelo by Giambattista Tiepolo, and the altar of the Blessed Sacrament, a work by Jacopo Sansovino dating back to around 1554. In the sacristy, there is another painting by Giambattista Tiepolo, Saint Francis of Paola. In the nearby Piazza Matteotti stands the town hall, built on a design by Giuseppe Jappelli in 1818, replacing the previous medieval municipal building. Another artistically significant building is the Sanctuary of Our Lady of Grace, located about a kilometer from the town center along the Fiumicello River.

== Demographic evolution ==
Historical population

Year	Pop.	±%
1861	?	—
1871	8,242	—
1881	8,606	+4.4%
1901	10,021	+16.4%
1911	11,522	+15.0%

Year	Pop.	±%
1921	12,894	+11.9%
1931	14,514	+12.6%
1936	15,272	+5.2%
1951	16,140	+5.7%
1961	14,349	−11.1%

Year	Pop.	±%
1971	15,782	+10.0%
1981	16,947	+7.4%
1991	17,353	+2.4%
2001	17,517	+0.9%

Source: Data from ISTAT

== Twin towns ==
Piove di Sacco is twinned with:

- Senden, Germany
- Kobierzyce, Poland
