= Valdarno chicken =

Italian breed of chicken

Valdarno
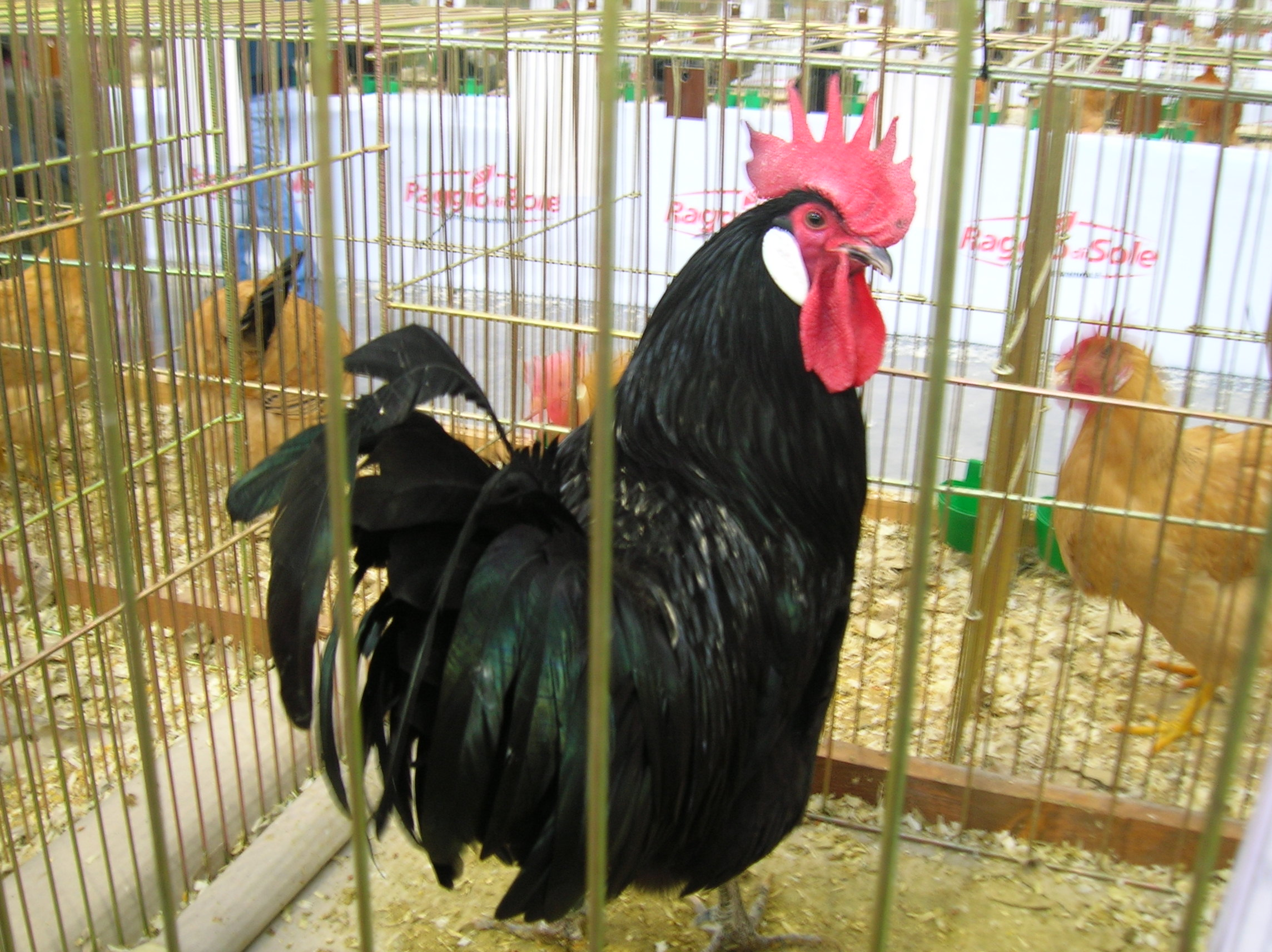
- A Valdarno cock
- Conservation status: Recovering
- Country of origin: Italy
- Distribution: Lower Valdarno, Tuscany

Traits
- Weight: Male: 2.5–2.8 kg (5.5–6 lb); Female: 2.0–2.3 kg (4.5–5 lb)
- Skin colour: white
- Egg colour: white
- Comb type: single

Classification

Notes
- dual-purpose breed
- Chicken; Gallus gallus domesticus

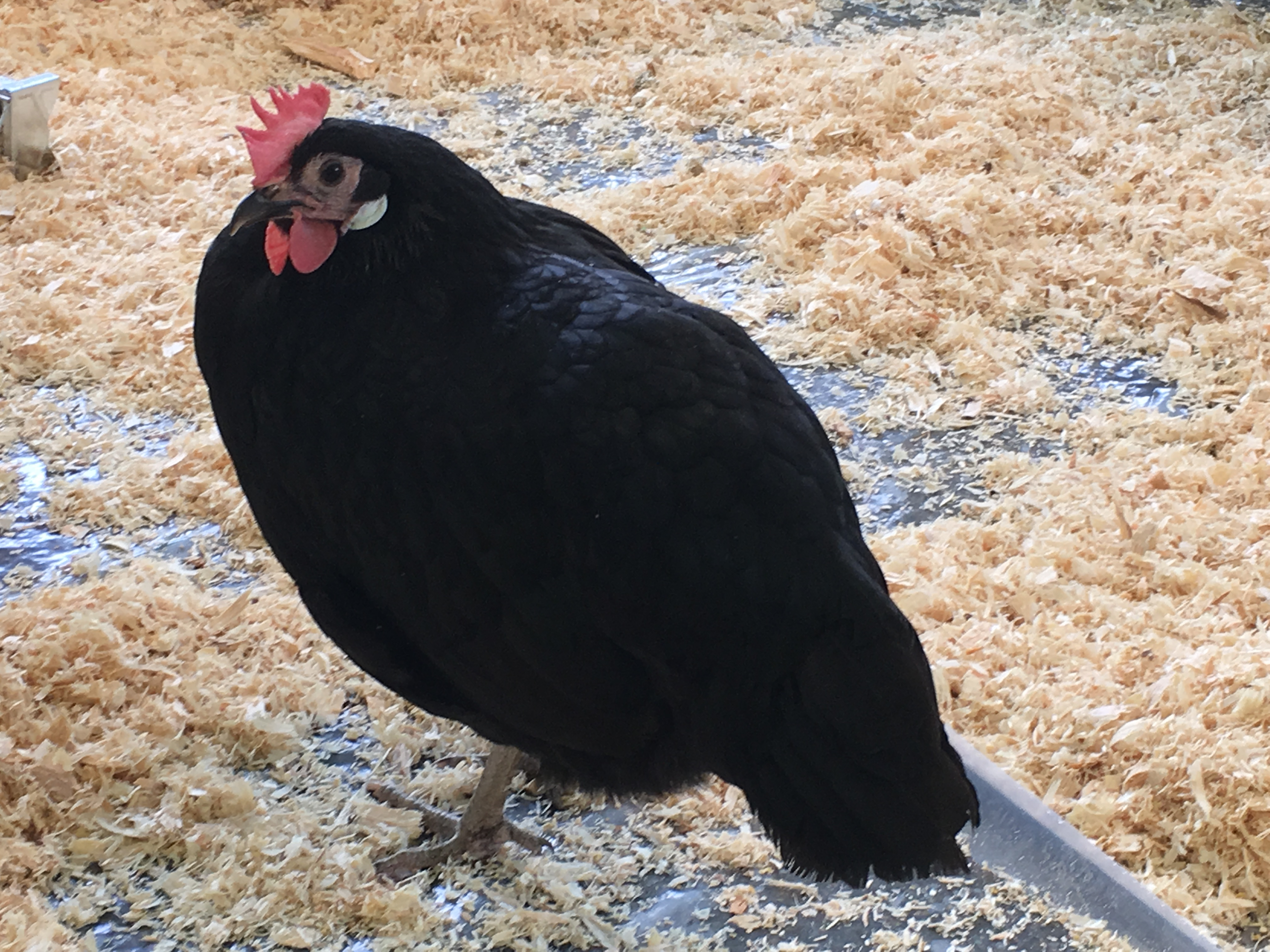
Hen at the Rural Festival of Gaiole in Chianti, 2016

The Valdarno is an Italian breed of black dual-purpose chicken. It originates in, and is named for, the lower part of the Valdarno, the valley of the Arno river, in Tuscany in central Italy. It became virtually extinct in the twentieth century, but the population is recovering. It is a quite different breed from the Valdarnese, which originates in the upper Valdarno, and is white.

== History ==
The Valdarno chicken takes its name from the Valdarno, the valley of the Arno river. It was in the past extensively raised in the lower part of the valley between Florence and the Tyrrhenian Sea and in the plains surrounding Pisa, in the areas of comuni such as Cerreto Guidi, Pontedera, Empoli, Poggibonsi and San Miniato.

The earliest description of the Valdarno chicken is that given in 1900 by Luigi Pochini, who recommends it above all others as suitable for both small- and large-scale rearing, for its rapid growth and the maternal instinct of the hens, but who notes that it requires space and does not adapt well to close confinement. He illustrates four colour varieties – black, white, buff, and cuckoo – and notes that the black and the white are the most common. The first breed standard was presented by Maggi at a conference in Mantua in 1905; the author believed the breed to date from before 1848 and noted the predominance of the black variety, as evidenced by the local saying "pollo nero, pollo vero", or "black chicken, real chicken". The breed was described by both Pascal and Faelli in the same year.

In the following years the Valdarno became the subject of extended and heated discussion of its authenticity, and of whether it should be considered a variety of the Livornese. Although its authenticity was eventually recognised, its numbers declined owing to competition from the White Leghorn, and despite various attempts by breeders to preserve it, continued to decline through most of the twentieth century until it had virtually disappeared. Recent reconstitution and recovery of the breed was based on a small number of autochthonous birds found in the Sienese countryside, with out-crossing to Bresse and Castellana Negra. The first results were presented at Reggio Emilia in 1998, and were well received. The Valdarno is bred to the 1905 standard, and is included in the official standard of the Federazione Italiana Associazioni Avicole, the federation of Italian poultry associations, the authority governing poultry breeding in Italy.

Breed numbers remain low. A study published in 2007 used a figure of approximately 200 for the total breeding stock, of which approximately 50 were cocks.

== Characteristics ==
The Valdarno is black, with dark green lights. The legs are a dark slate colour, and the beak is black. The skin is white. The comb is medium-large, with 5–6 points. The wattles are medium-long and red, the ear-lobes oval and porcelain white. Average weight is 2.5–2.8 kg for cocks, 2.0–2.3 kg for hens. The eggs are white and weigh at least 55 g. Ring size is 18 mm for cocks, 116 mm for hens.
