= Valdarnese =

Italian breed of chicken

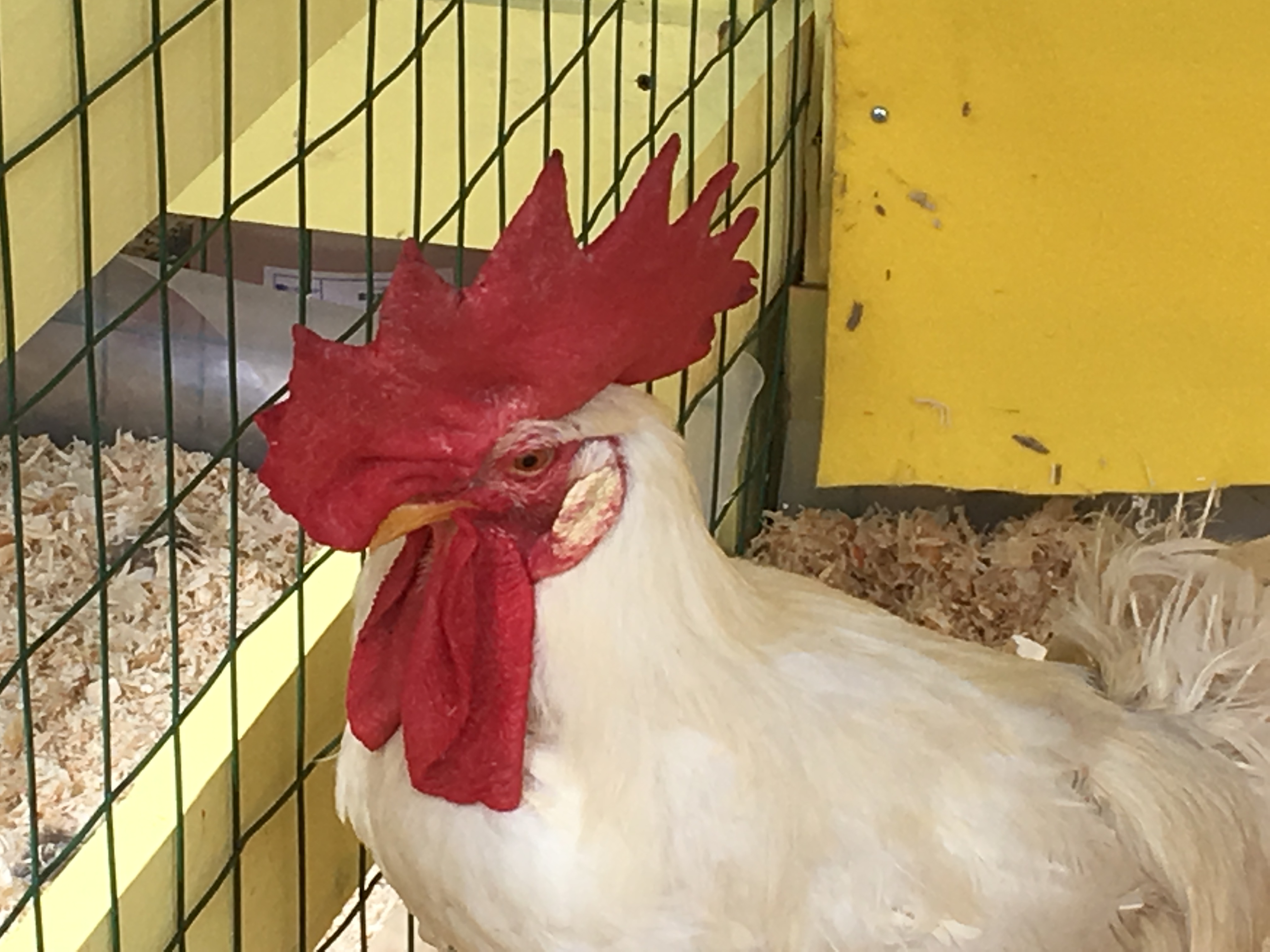
- Cock bird
- Conservation status: recovering
- Country of origin: Italy
- Distribution: Upper Valdarno, Tuscany

Traits
- Weight: Male: 2.9–3.3 kg (6.5–7.5 lb); Female: 2.0–2.5 kg (4.5–5.5 lb)
- Skin color: yellow
- Egg color: ivory white
- Comb type: single

Classification
- Chicken; Gallus gallus domesticus

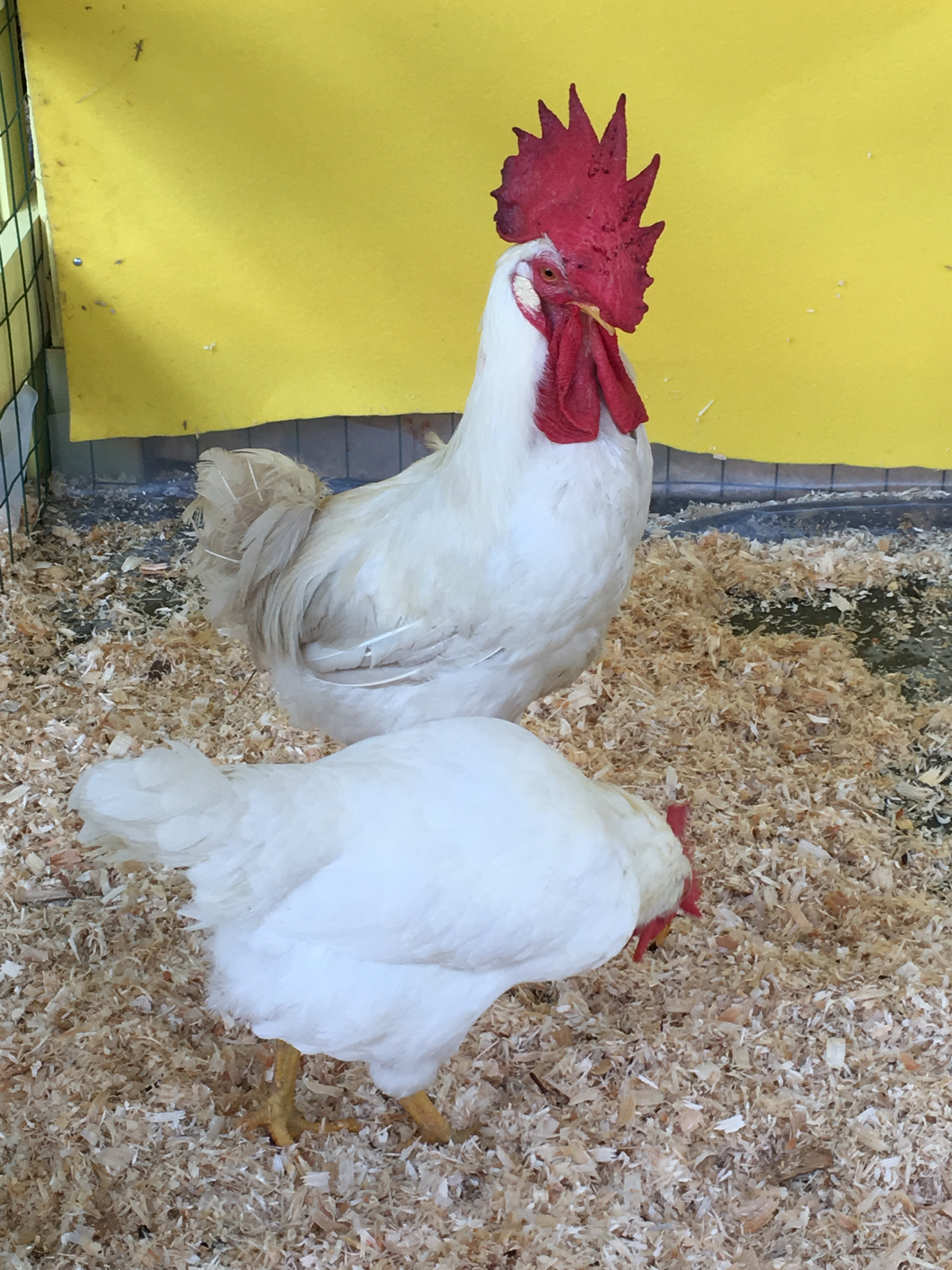
Cock and hen at the Rural Festival, Gaiole in Chianti, 2016

The Valdarnese, also referred to as Valdarnese Bianca, Valdarno Bianca or Pollo del Valdarno, is a breed of large white chicken from the upper Valdarno, the valley of the Arno river, in Tuscany in central Italy. It became virtually extinct in the twentieth century, but the population is recovering. It is a different breed from the Valdarno Nero, which originates in the lower part of the Valdarno, and is black.

== History ==
The Valdarnese takes its name from the Valdarno, the valley of the Arno river. It was in the past extensively raised in the upper part of the Arno valley which runs south-east from Florence towards Arezzo, in the comuni of Montevarchi, San Giovanni Valdarno and Terranuova Bracciolini in the heart of the valley, and neighbouring comuni including Bucine, Castelfranco di Sopra, Cavriglia, Figline Valdarno, Laterina, Loro Ciuffenna and Pergine Valdarno.

The first description of the white chickens of the Valdarno is that of Giuseppe Licciardelli in 1899. Luigi Pochini (1900, 1905) recommends the Valdarno breed above all others as suitable for both small- and large-scale rearing, for its rapid growth and the maternal instinct of the hens, but notes that it requires space and does not adapt well to close confinement. He illustrates four colour varieties, black, white, buff and cuckoo, and notes that the black and the white are the most common. The Valdarno breed was also described by Ferruccio Faelli in 1905.

Various examples of white Valdarnese chickens were exhibited in Cremona and Varese in the 1950s. In the following years the Valdarnese became the subject of extended and heated discussion of its authenticity, with critics maintaining that its high productivity was due to hybrid vigour. It also had supporters, and a breed association was formed in 1955. Studies of the Valdarnese by Raffaello Quilici, director of the Stazione Sperimentale di Pollicoltura ('experimental poultry-breeding station') of Rovigo from 1957, led to the first scientific description. The collapse of the traditional mezzadria system in the 1960s caused a rapid decline in breed numbers, aggravated both by the growth of intensive methods of poultry-farming and by competition from the White Leghorn breed, of which chicks incubated in northern Italy were readily available. The breed association closed in 1964, and the Valdarnese continued to decline through the later twentieth century until it had virtually disappeared.

The risk of extinction of the breed was recognised in the 1990s, and the Conservatorio delle Razze Avicole in Pericolo di Estinzione ('conservation centre for avian breeds in danger of extinction') of the Veneto region began a repopulation programme. When the Conservatorio closed in 2001, the remaining breeding stock was transferred to the Valdarno area. This stock formed the basis for a project for the recovery and protection of the breed launched by the Agenzia Regionale per lo Sviluppo e l'Innovazione nel Settore Agricolo-Forestale, a part of the Tuscan regional administration for agriculture.

The Valdarnese is not included in the official standard of the Federazione Italiana Associazioni Avicole, the federation of Italian poultry associations, which is the national authority governing poultry breeding in Italy. It is, however, recognised by the Regione Toscana, the regional administration of Tuscany, which publishes the breed standard. A breed register is held by the Associazione Provinciale Allevatori ('provincial breeders' association') of Arezzo.

Breed numbers remain low. A study published in 2007 used a figure of approximately 1200 for the total breeding stock, of which approximately 300 were cocks.

== Characteristics ==
The Valdarnese is white, with some tendency to straw-colour on the neck and back allowable in cocks. The legs are orange-yellow, and the skin is yellow. The comb and wattles are large and blood-red; the comb has five or six points. The ear-lobes are creamy yellow with some red veining. Weights are in the range 2.9 to 3.3 kg for cocks and 2.0 to 2.5 kg for hens.

== Use ==
The Valdarnese is raised principally for its meat, which is firm and of high quality. Approximately 6000 birds are slaughtered per year.

Hens have a strong tendency to broodiness, and so are poor layers. The annual egg yield is approximately 135; the eggs are ivory-white and usually weigh between 58 and 70 g..
