= Arzergrande =

- Comune
- Comune di Arzergrande
- Location within Italy Location within Veneto
- Coordinates: 45°17′N 12°3′E
- Country: Italy
- Region: Veneto
- Province: Province of Padua (PD)
- Frazioni: Vallonga

Area
  - Total: 13.6 km^{2} (5.3 sq mi)

Population (Dec. 2004)
  - Total: 4,257
  - Density: 313/km^{2} (811/sq mi)
- Time zone: UTC+1 (CET)
  - Summer (DST): UTC+2 (CEST)
- Postal code: 35020
- Dialing code: 049

Arzergrande is a comune (municipality) in the Province of Padua in the Italian region Veneto, located about 25 kilometres (16 mi) southwest of Venice and about 20 kilometres (12 mi) southeast of Padua. As of 31 December 2004, it had a population of 4,257 and an area of 13.6 square kilometres (5.3 mi^{2}).

The municipality of Arzergrande contains the frazione (subdivision) Vallonga.

Arzergrande borders the following municipalities: Codevigo, Piove di Sacco, Pontelongo.

== Demographic evolution ==
Historical population

| Year | Pop. | ±% |
|---|---|---|
| 1861 | ? | — |
| 1871 | 2,288 | — |
| 1881 | 2,361 | +3.2% |
| 1901 | 2,912 | +23.3% |
| 1911 | 3,690 | +26.7% |

| Year | Pop. | ±% |
|---|---|---|
| 1921 | 4,411 | +19.5% |
| 1931 | 5,069 | +14.9% |
| 1936 | 5,229 | +3.2% |
| 1951 | 5,009 | −4.2% |
| 1961 | 4,181 | −16.5% |

| Year | Pop. | ±% |
|---|---|---|
| 1971 | 4,021 | −3.8% |
| 1981 | 3,973 | −1.2% |
| 1991 | 4,040 | +1.7% |
| 2001 | 4,113 | +1.8% |

Source: Data from ISTAT
