= Siciliana chicken =

Italian breed of chicken

Siciliana
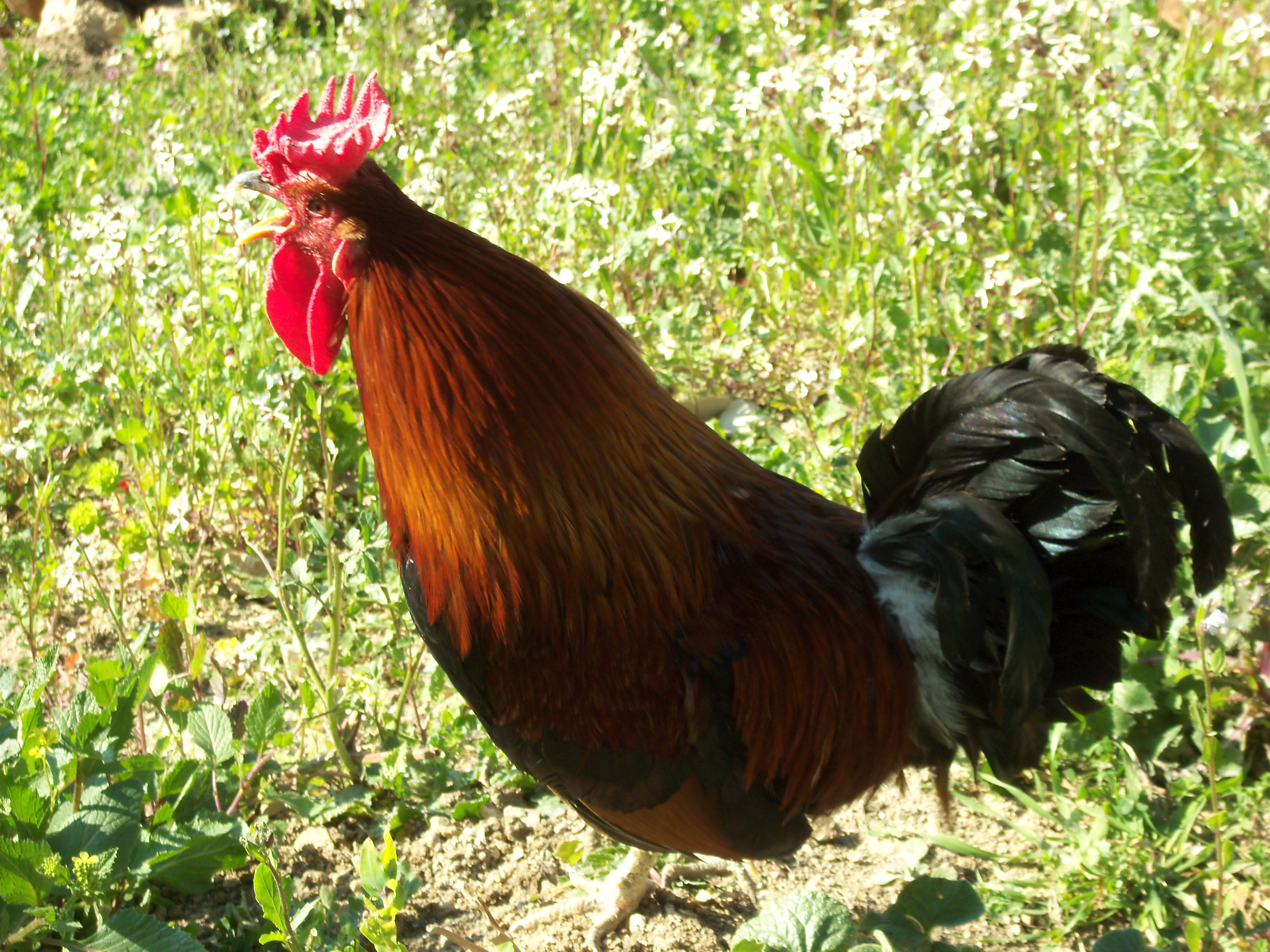
- Conservation status: recovering
- Country of origin: Sicily, Italy

Traits
- Weight: Male: 2.0–2.4 kg (4.5–5.5 lb); Female: 1.6–1.8 kg (3.5–4 lb)
- Skin colour: yellow
- Egg colour: variable, white to light brown
- Comb type: crown

Classification
- Chicken; Gallus gallus domesticus

The Siciliana is an ancient Italian breed of chicken from the Mediterranean island of Sicily. It is notable for its unusual double or rose comb, for the early age at which birds reach maturity, and for the unusual shape of the eggs. The Sicilian Buttercup, bred in Australia, Great Britain and the North America, derives from it, but its long separation from the original stock has led to marked differences between the two.

== History ==
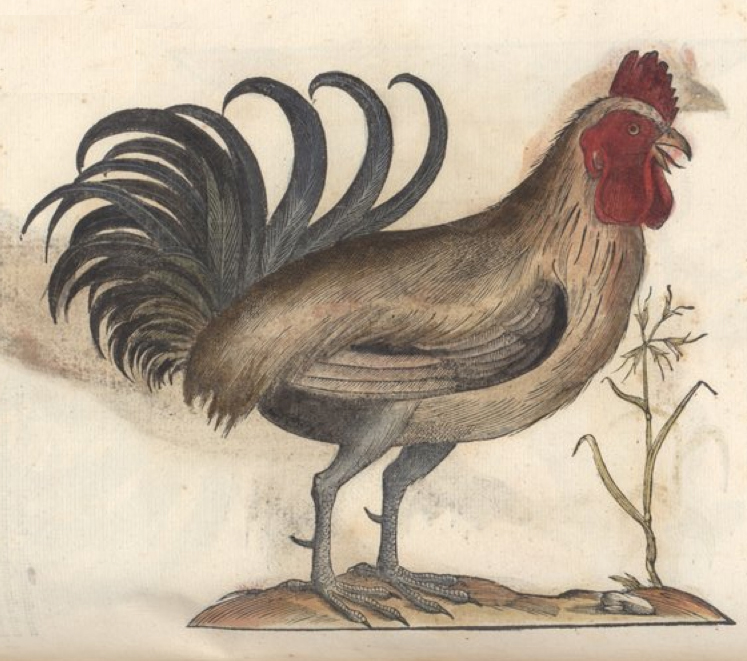
Gallus turcicus, from the Ornithologiae tomus alter of Ulisse Aldrovandi (1522–1605)

The Siciliana appears to derive from ancient inter-breeding of local Sicilian birds with North African stock such as the rose-combed Berbera breed or the Tripolitana described by Tucci. These birds may have been similar to the Gallus turcicus described by Ulisse Aldrovandi in 1600. Chickens similar to the Siciliana are depicted in sixteenth-century paintings in the Vatican Museums and the Galleria Borghese in Rome, and in Florence and Paris.

In about 1863 or 1877, a certain Cephas Dawes of Dedham, Massachusetts, captain of the Frutiere, was loading oranges in Sicily and bought a number of chickens to provide meat on his homeward journey. Some of these continued to lay well during the voyage, and were kept for eggs instead. Some of them were later sold to one C. Carroll Loring, also of Dedham, who became the first breeder of what would become the Sicilian Buttercup. All American Buttercups, however, descend from a later shipment of hatchlings, in 1892.

In Sicily, the Siciliana was bred from 1913 by Francesco Tucci, director of the Istituto Zootecnico, or zoo-technical institute, of Palermo, who bred only gold-coloured birds and who established the first standard for the breed. The Siciliana was described in 1922 by Ferruccio Frau-Sanna, who praised the work of Tucci but found stocks to be low and of uneven type. The breed declined through most of the twentieth century until by the 1980s it was all but extinct. In 1986 some examples were shown at Forlì, and interest in the breed was renewed; it was for some time among the breeds under the protection of the Stazione Sperimentale di Pollicoltura (experimental poultry-breeding station) of Rovigo and of the Conservatorio delle Razze Avicole in Pericolo di Estinzione (centre for avian breeds in danger of extinction) of the Veneto region.

In 2004 the Siciliana was included in the official standard of the Federazione Italiana Associazioni Avicole, the federation of Italian poultry associations, which is the national authority governing poultry breeding in Italy.

Breed numbers remain low. A study published in 2007 used a figure of approximately 1000 for the total breeding stock, of which approximately 250 were cocks.

== Characteristics ==
Four colour varieties are recognised in the Siciliana: golden duckwing, black, white and – since June 2008 – blue. The legs are willow green, and the skin is soft and yellow. The comb is cup-shaped, the two parts joined at the front and preferably also at the back, preferably with five well-defined points on each side. The ear-lobes are red; some white is tolerated. Average weight is 2.0–2.4 kg for cocks, 1.6–1.8 kg for hens.

== Use ==
The Siciliana matures early. Male chicks may begin to crow at four weeks and display sexual behaviour at 40 days. Pullets begin laying at four or five months.

The eggs range from white to light brown in colour, and weigh at least 45 g. They are of an unusually elongated and pointed shape. Ring size is 18 mm for cocks, 16 mm for hens.
