= Mugellese =

Italian breed of chicken

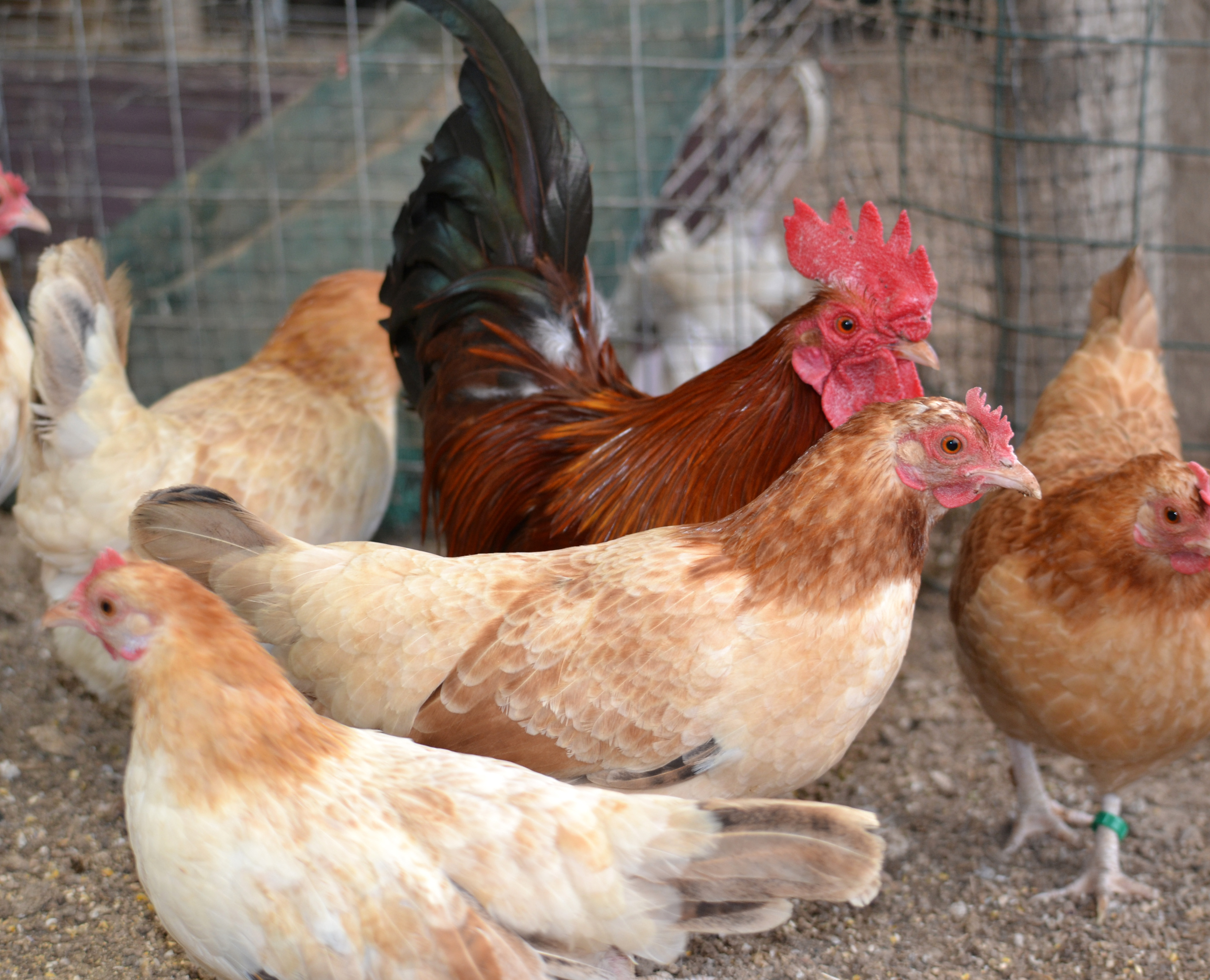
- Conservation status: DAD-IS (2021): at risk
- Other names: Mugginese
- Country of origin: Italy
- Distribution: Tuscany

Traits
- Weight: Male: 0.8 kg; Female: 0.7 kg
- Skin colour: white
- Egg colour: ivory white
- Comb type: single

Classification
- APA: no
- EE: no
- PCGB: no
- Chicken; Gallus gallus domesticus

The Mugellese, also known as Mugginese, is a rustic dual-purpose breed of small chicken or bantam from Tuscany, in central Italy. It takes its name from the historic Mugello region to the north-east of Florence. It is not officially recognised as a breed in Italy, but is being considered for recognition.

== History ==
The Mugellese is named after the Mugello, a historic and rural region which extends to the north-east of Florence and which traditionally corresponds with the comuni of Barberino di Mugello, Borgo San Lorenzo, Dicomano, San Piero a Sieve, Scarperia, Vaglia and Vicchio. It is one of the few bantam breeds in Italy, others being the Mericanel della Brianza and the Pépoi.

The Mugellese is a traditional chicken breed of Tuscany, of uncertain origins. It was once extensively kept not only in the Tuscan countryside, but also in the gardens or on the balconies of town houses, perhaps as a pet. It was traditional for grandparents to give a pair of Mugellesi to a child who had reached an age to care for them. Once very common, it became rare in the second half of the twentieth century; it is now in a phase of recovery, selection and improvement.

In early 2012, the Mugellese was not officially recognised by the Federazione Italiana Associazioni Avicole, but was under consideration. A draft standard had been prepared, but not yet approved.

== Characteristics ==
The colouring of the Mugellese is dark golden (partridge); hens may also be wheaten buff. The skin is white and legs are pale or flesh-coloured. The comb is single, with 4–6 points. The ear-lobes range from red to white; the latter is preferred. Average weight is 0.8 kg (1.8 lb) for cocks, 0.7 kg (1.5 lb) for hens. The eggs are small and ivory-white.

The Mugellese is an active and lively breed. Although small, cocks are highly aggressive towards other cocks. Hens are good sitters, and may sit almost year-round. In the past, capons were often used to care for hatchlings. Birds are robust and resistant to heat and cold, and can be kept in the open all year. If allowed to, they roost in trees.
