= Codevigo =

- Comune
- Comune di Codevigo
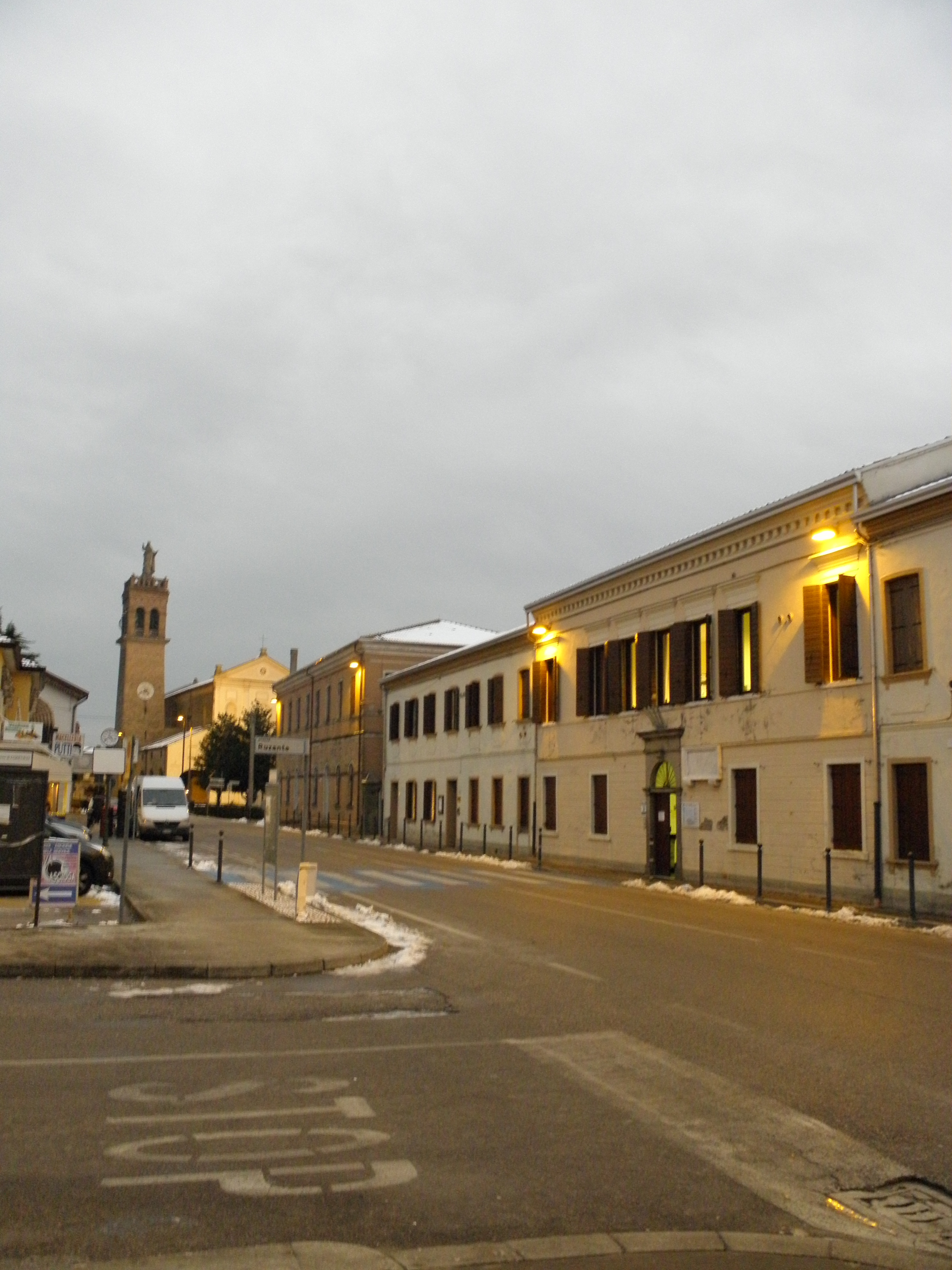

- Location within Italy Location within Veneto
- Coordinates: 45°16′N 12°6′E
- Country: Italy
- Region: Veneto
- Province: Province of Padua (PD)

Area
  - Total: 69.9 km^{2} (27.0 sq mi)

Population (Dec. 2004)
  - Total: 5,901
  - Density: 84.4/km^{2} (219/sq mi)
- Time zone: UTC+1 (CET)
  - Summer (DST): UTC+2 (CEST)
- Postal code: 35020
- Dialing code: 049

Codevigo is a comune (municipality) in the Province of Padua in the Italian region Veneto, located about 25 kilometres (16 mi) southwest of Venice and about 25 kilometres (16 mi) southeast of Padua. As of 31 December 2004, it had a population of 5,901 and an area of 69.9 square kilometres (27.0 mi^{2}).

Codevigo borders the following municipalities: Arzergrande, Campagna Lupia, Chioggia, Correzzola, Piove di Sacco, Pontelongo.

The mayor of Codevigo is Annunzio Belan who is the leader of the citizens league "Cambiare si puo'" (transl. "It is possible to change") which won the administrative elections on 27 May 2013.

== Demographic evolution ==
Historical population

Year	Pop.	±%
1861	?	—
1871	2,365	—
1881	2,821	+19.3%
1901	3,739	+32.5%
1911	4,814	+28.8%

Year	Pop.	±%
1921	5,648	+17.3%
1931	6,358	+12.6%
1936	7,001	+10.1%
1951	7,318	+4.5%
1961	5,518	−24.6%

Year	Pop.	±%
1971	5,073	−8.1%
1981	5,299	+4.5%
1991	5,384	+1.6%
2001	5,617	+4.3%

Source: Data from ISTAT

== Twin towns – sister cities ==
Codevigo is twinned with:

- Szécsény, Hungary
