= Romagnola chicken =

Italian breed of chicken

Romagnola
- Conservation status: recovering, awaiting recognition
- Country of origin: Italy
- Use: dual-purpose breed

Traits
- Weight: Male: 2.0–2.5 kg (4–6 lb); Female: 1.9–2.0 kg (4–4 lb)
- Skin colour: creamy or pale yellow
- Egg colour: white
- Comb type: single

Classification
- Chicken; Gallus gallus domesticus

The Romagnola is a traditional Italian breed of dual-purpose chicken from the Emilia-Romagna region. It was formerly widespread in central Italy, but in the late twentieth century came close to extinction. In early 2012 the population was recovering, and the breed was awaiting official recognition by the Federazione Italiana Associazioni Avicole, the federation of Italian poultry associations.

== History ==
The Romagnola is a traditional rustic dual-purpose chicken breed. It was once widespread in central Italy, particularly in the provinces of Ravenna, Forlì-Cesena and Bologna in Emilia-Romagna. In the mid-twentieth century, selective breeding by the Stazione Sperimentale di Pollicoltura ('experimental chicken breeding centre') of Rovigo, in the Veneto, and the Ispettorato Provinciale dell'Agricoltura ('provincial inspectorate for agriculture') of Ravenna produced two well-defined colour varieties, a silver and a golden. Subsequently, the Romagnola declined, and was close to extinction when the provincial administration of the Province of Parma and the faculty of veterinary medicine of the University of Parma began a joint recovery programme. A breeders' association, the Associazione Razze e Varietà Autoctone Romagnole, was formed in 2007 and a pilot production programme begun. In early 2012, the breed was awaiting recognition by the Federazione Italiana Associazioni Avicole.

Breed numbers remain low. A study published in 2007 used a figure of approximately 100 for the total breeding stock, of which about 30 were cocks.

== Characteristics ==
The colour of the Romagnola is variable; the black-flecked silver and black-flecked golden colour varieties are most often seen. The skin is creamy white or pale yellow. The legs vary from yellow to very dark, which is preferred. The ear-lobes are creamy white, sometimes tinged with blue. The comb is single, with five or more points. Weights are in the range 2.0–2.5 kg for cocks, 1.9–2.0 kg for hens.

== Uses ==
The Romagnola is a dual-purpose breed. Hens lay some 150 eggs per year. Young birds are hardy and fast-growing; the meat is well-flavoured. The eggs are white and weigh about 60 g.
