= Rhode Island Red =

American breed of domestic chicken

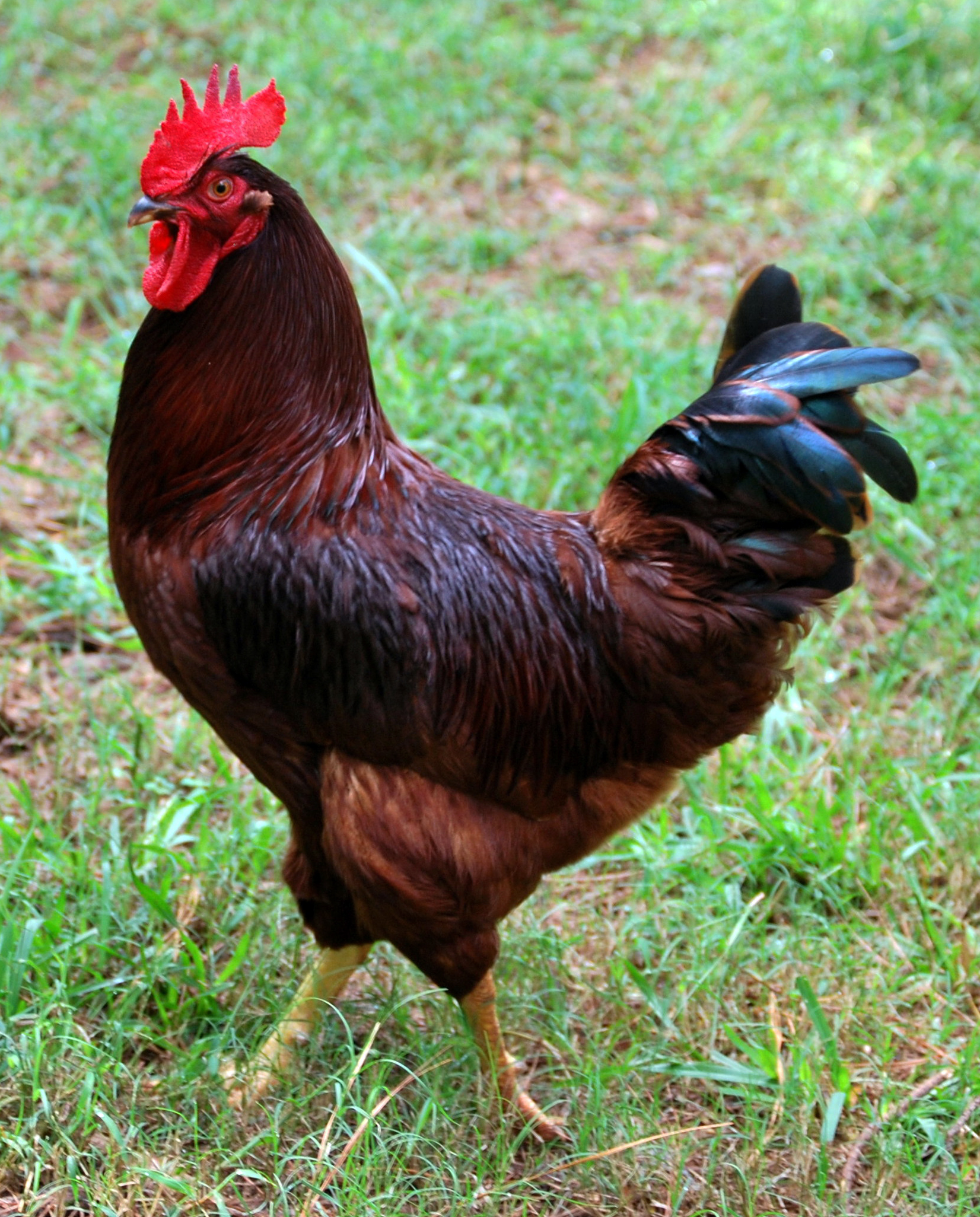
- Rhode Island Red cock
- Conservation status: Livestock Conservancy: watch
- Other names: Rhode Islands; Golden Buffs; John Macomber Fowls; Tripp Fowls
- Country of origin: United States
- Use: dual-purpose

Traits
- Weight: Male: Standard: 3.9 kg (8.6 lb); Bantam: 965 g (34.0 oz); Female: Standard: 3 kg (6.6 lb); Bantam: 850 g (30 oz)
- Skin color: yellow
- Egg color: brown
- Comb type: single or rose

Classification
- APA: American
- EE: yes
- PCGB: soft feather: heavy
- Chicken; Gallus gallus domesticus

The Rhode Island Red is an American breed of domestic chicken. It is the state bird of Rhode Island. It was developed there and in Massachusetts in the late nineteenth century, by cross-breeding birds of Oriental origin such as the Malay with brown Leghorn birds from Italy. It was a dual-purpose breed, raised both for meat and for eggs; modern strains have been bred for their egg-laying abilities. The traditional non-industrial strains of the Rhode Island Red are listed as "watch" (medium conservation priority, between "recovering" and "threatened") by The Livestock Conservancy. It is a separate breed to the Rhode Island White.

== History ==
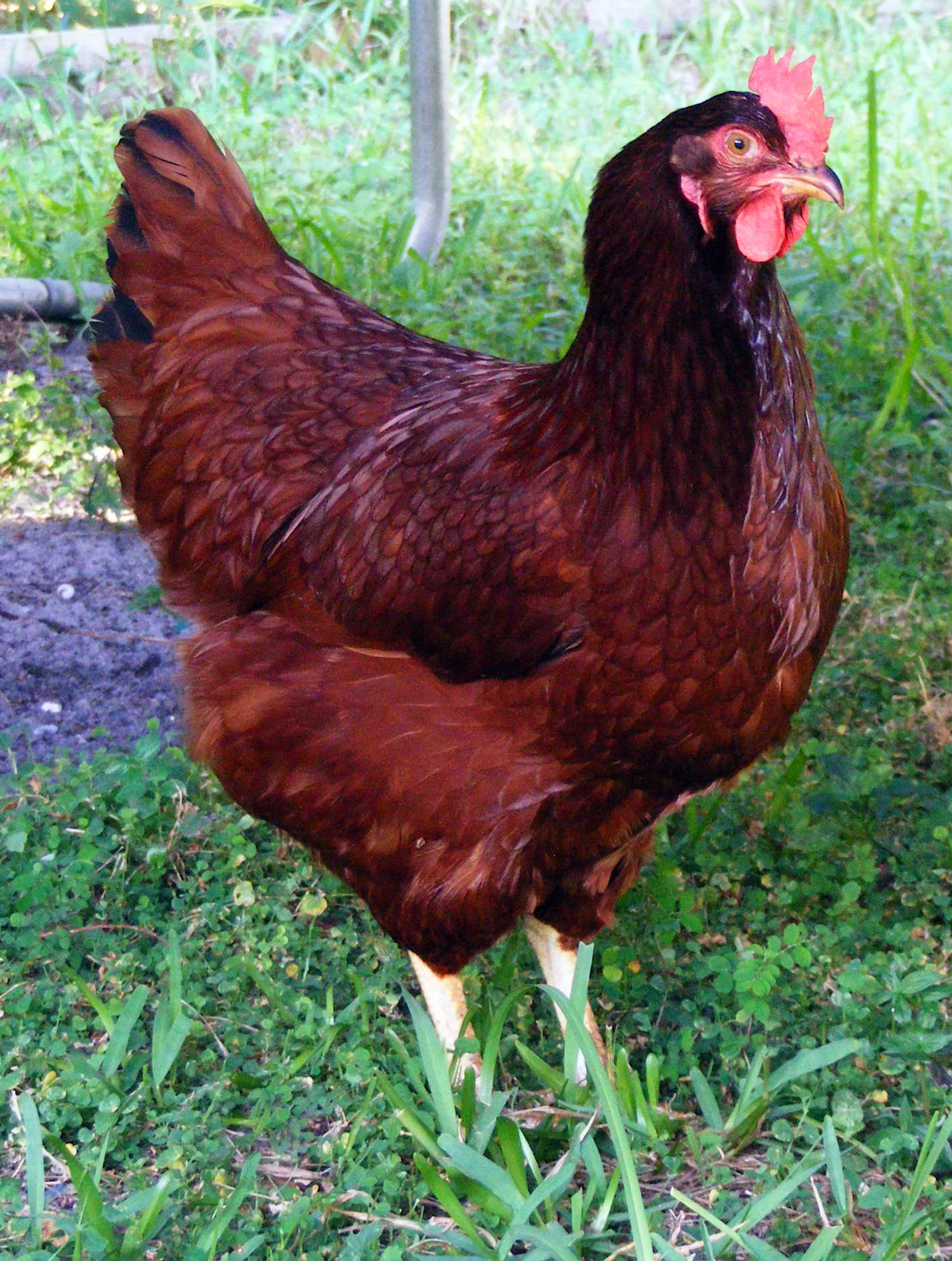
Hen

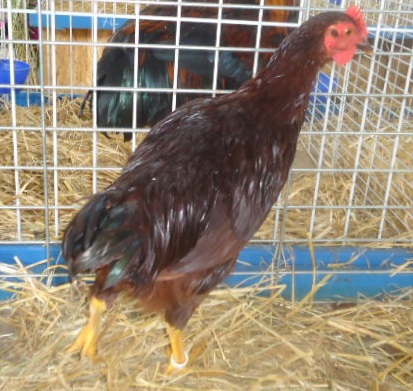
Rhode Island Red bantam

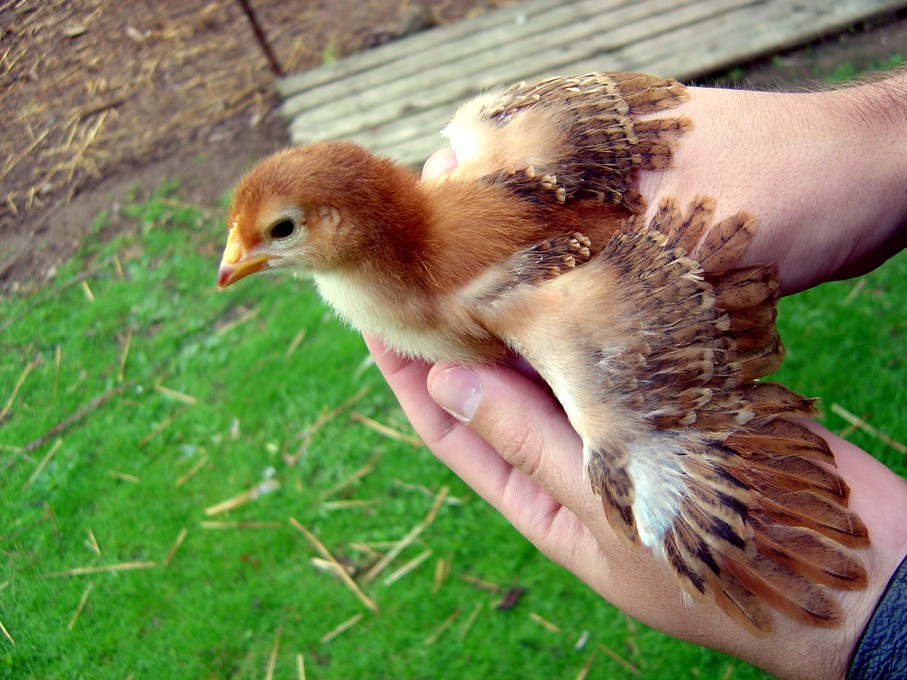
Chick, 9 days old

The Rhode Island Red was bred in Rhode Island and Massachusetts in the second half of the nineteenth century, by selective breeding of birds of Oriental origin such as the Cochin, Java, Malay and Shanghai with brown Leghorn birds from Italy. The characteristic deep red plumage derived from the Malay. The State of Rhode Island celebrated the centenary of the breed in 1954, when the Rhode Island Red Monument was raised at the William Tripp farm, in Little Compton, Rhode Island.

The name of the breed is ascribed either to Isaac Champlin Wilbour of Little Compton at an unknown date, or to a Mr. Jenny of the Southern Massachusetts Poultry Association in 1879 or 1880. In 1891 Nathaniel Borden Aldrich exhibited some as "Golden Buffs" in Rhode Island and in Philadelphia; they were first exhibited under the present name in 1895. They were previously also known as "John Macomber fowls" or "Tripp fowls."

The first breed standard was drawn up in 1898, and was approved by the American Rhode Island Red Club in Boston in 1901; the single-comb variety was admitted to the Standard of Perfection of the American Poultry Association in 1904, and the rose-comb in 1906.

== Characteristics ==
The color of the plumage of the traditional Rhode Island red ranges from a lustrous deep red to almost black; the tail is mostly black. The comb may be either single or rose-comb; it is vivid red, as are the earlobes and wattles. The beak is a reddish horn color, the eyes are reddish bay, and the feet and legs are yellow, often with some red on the toes and sides of the shanks. Industrial strains may be smaller and paler in color than the old-type breed.

== Use ==
The Rhode Island Red was developed as a dual-purpose breed, to provide both meat and eggs. Since about 1940, it has been selectively bred predominantly for egg-laying qualities, and the modern industrial Rhode Island Red is a layer breed. Rhode Island Reds have been used in the creation of many modern hybrid breeds.

The traditional dual-purpose "old-type" Rhode Island Red lays 200–300 brown eggs per year, and yields rich-flavored meat. It is included in the Ark of Taste of the Slow Food Foundation.
