= Rhode Island White =

American breed of chicken

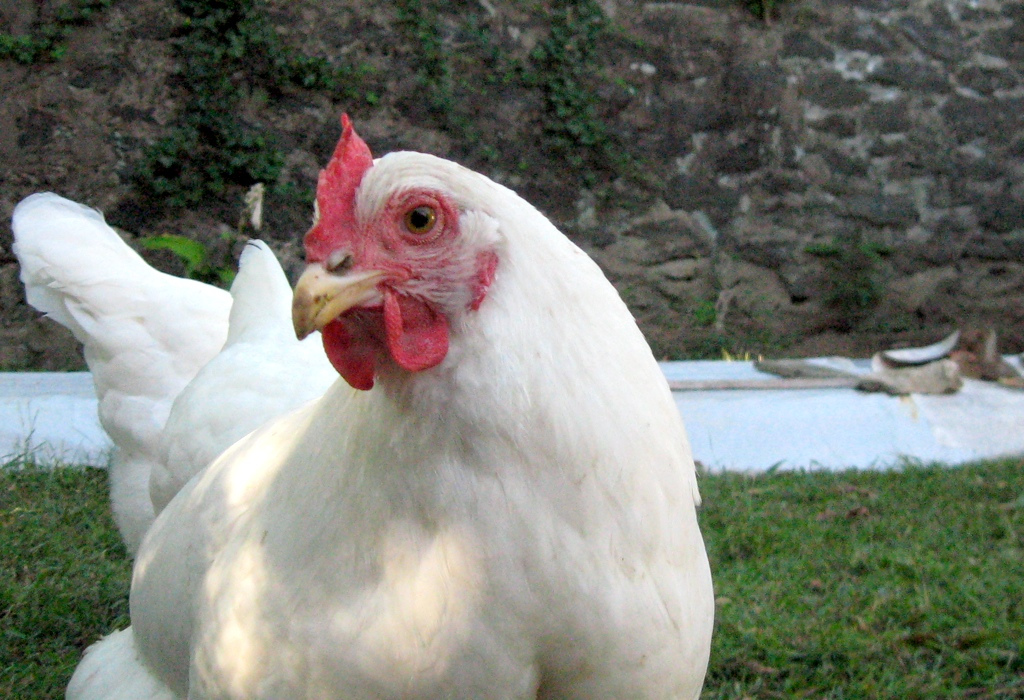
- A hen
- Conservation status: FAO (2007): not at risk; Livestock Conservancy (2025): watch; DAD-IS (2026): unknown
- Country of origin: United States
- Use: dual-purpose layer breed

Traits
- Egg colour: light brown to dark brown
- Colour: white

Classification
- APA: American
- ABA: rose comb clean legged
- EE: listed, not recognised
- PCGB: no

The Rhode Island White is an American breed of chicken. It originates in the state of Rhode Island, in New England in the eastern United States. It is considered in that country to be a distinct breed from the Rhode Island Red. In Australia and in the European Union it is considered a color variant of the Rhode Island breed.

== History ==
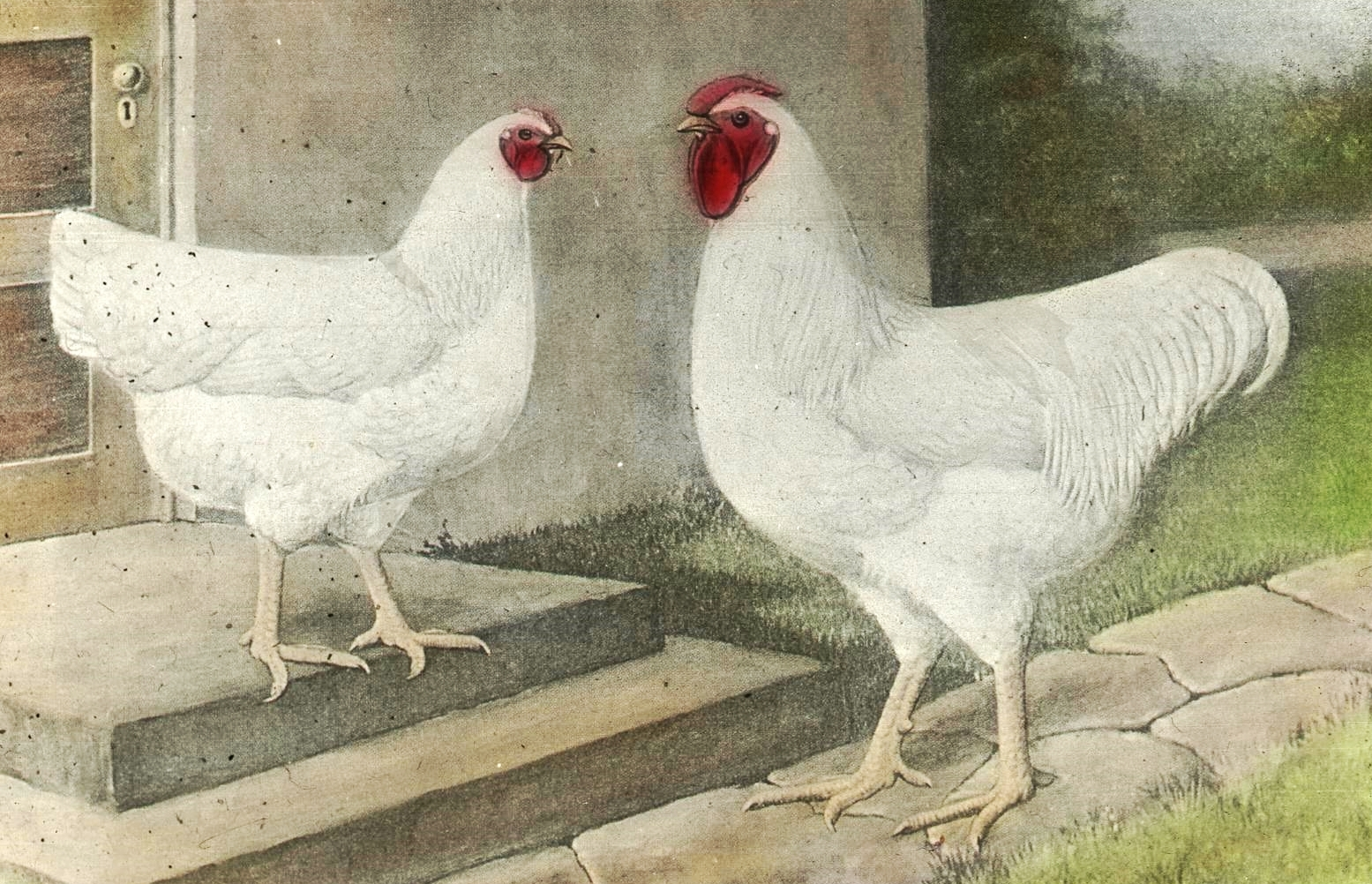
Hen and cock, illustration from the 1920s

The Rhode Island White arose from the work of John Alonzo Jocoy of Peacedale, Rhode Island, who from about 1888 cross-bred Partridge Cochins, White Wyandottes and the rose-comb type of White Leghorn. He started selling birds in 1903, but continued selective breeding to increase the resemblance of his stock to the Rhode Island Red.

It was added to the Standard of Perfection of the American Poultry Association in 1922; the bantam version was added in 1960. In the European Union the white is listed by the Entente Européenne as a color variant of the Rhode Island breed, but is not recognised; nor is it recognised by the Poultry Club of Great Britain.

The breed was fairly widespread until the 1960s, since when numbers have fallen. No numbers have been reported to the DAD-IS database of the Food and Agriculture Organization of the United Nations since 2015, when a total population of 534 birds was reported. In 2025 it was listed as "watch" by the Livestock Conservancy, and in 2026 its conservation status was listed by the FAO as "unknown".

== Characteristics ==
There is only one color variety, the white. The rose-comb, the wattles and the oblong earlobes are all of medium size and are bright red. The eyes are a reddish bay, while the beak, shanks and toes are yellow. Average bodyweights for large fowl are about 3.9 kg (8.5 lb) for cocks and 3.0 kg (7 lb) for hens; the corresponding weights for bantams are approximately 1000 g (35 oz) and 850 g (30 oz).

== Use ==
The Rhode Island White is a dual-purpose fowl, suitable for production of both meat and eggs. Hens may give some 200–250 large eggs per year, varying from light to dark brown in colour; they have little tendency to broodiness.

It may be cross-bred with the Rhode Island Red create Red Sex-Link hybrids.
