= Padovana chicken =

Italian breed of chicken

Padovana
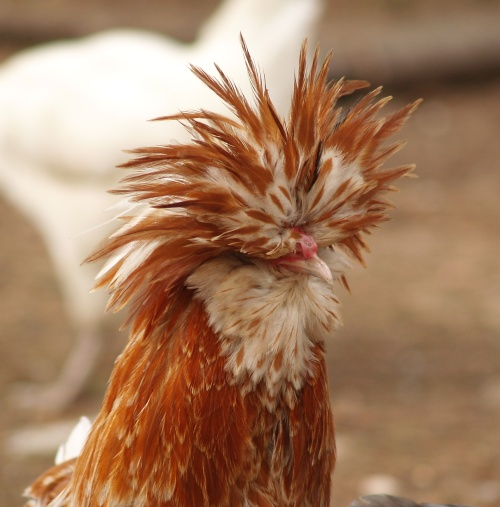
- Cock bird
- Conservation status: FAO (2007): not listed; DAD-IS (2023): at risk/endangered
- Other names: Padovana dal gran ciuffo
- Country of origin: Italy

Traits
- Weight: Male: 1.8–2.3 kg; Female: 1.5–2.0 kg
- Skin colour: white
- Egg colour: cream to light brown
- Comb type: none

Classification

Notes
- crested breed
- Chicken; Gallus gallus domesticus

The Padovana or Padovana dal gran ciuffo is an ancient Italian breed of small crested and bearded chicken. It originates in – and is named for – the city of Padova and the surrounding province, in the Veneto region of north-eastern Italy. Despite continuing discussion surrounding its true origins, it is recognised in Italy as an indigenous Italian breed.

== History ==
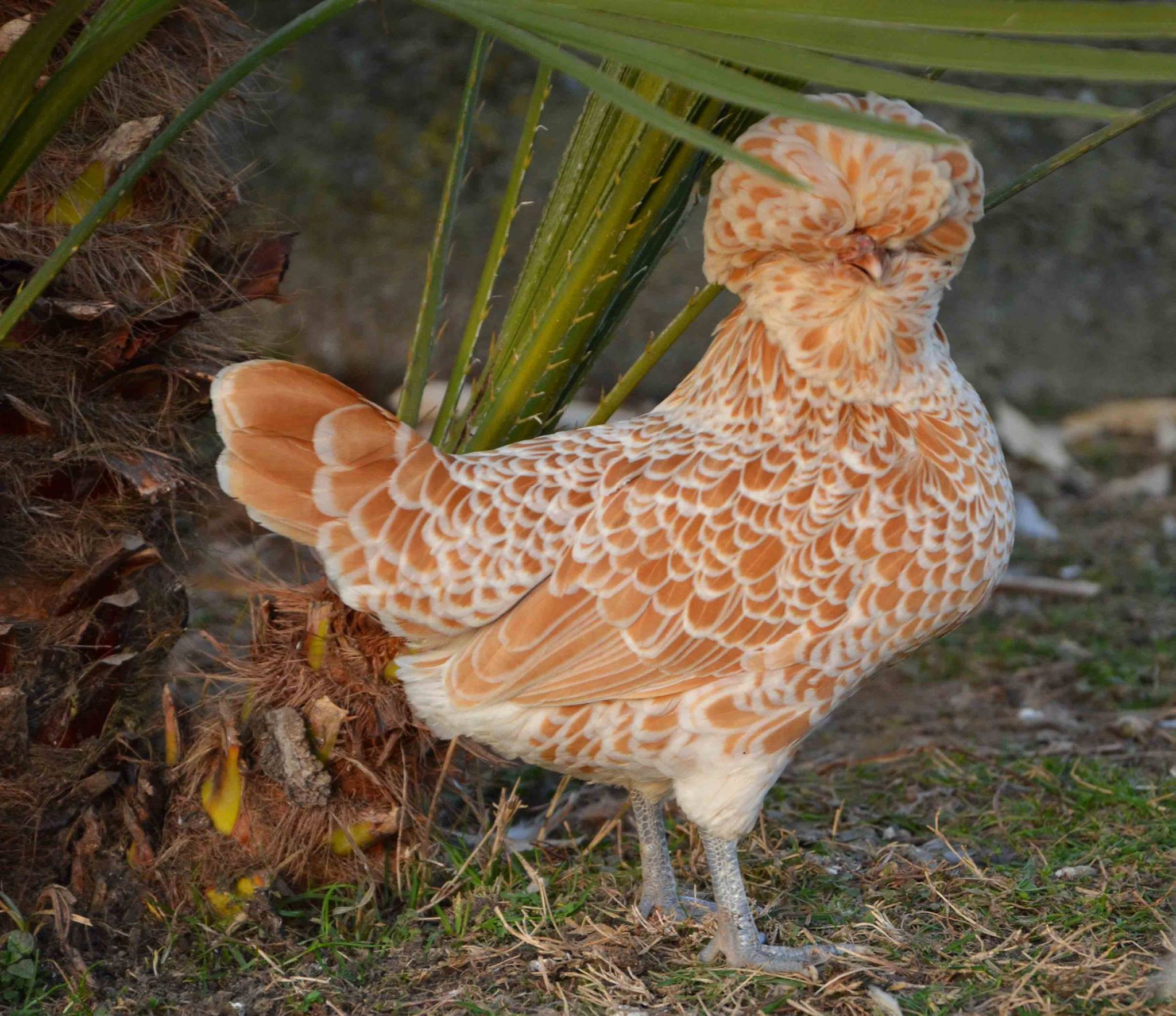
Buff laced hen bird

The early history of the Padovana is unclear, and the subject of continuing discussion, as is its relationship to the Polish and the Dutch crested (Hollandse Kuifhoen) and Dutch bearded crested (Nederlandse Baardkuifhoen) breeds, which are variously considered to have originated in the Netherlands, in Poland, in Russia, or elsewhere. It is often reported that the Padovana was brought from Poland to Italy by the "Marquis" Giovanni Dondi dell'Orologio (1330–1388). However the Dondi who was ennobled was the soldier Francesco Dondi, created Marquis by King John III Sobieski in 1676; no journey to or contact with Poland by Giovanni Dondi in the fourteenth century is documented.

Two sources provide evidence of crested chickens in Europe in Roman times: the two marble statuettes of crested chickens observed in the Sala degli Animali of the Vatican Museums in 1927 by Alessandro Ghigi date from the first or second century AD; a chicken skull excavated at West Hill, Uley, in Gloucestershire in England, shows the typical cerebral hernia of the crested breeds and dates from the fourth century.

Early iconographic evidence of the breed in Padova is the fresco of the Annunciation painted in 1397 by Jacopo da Verona in the Oratorio di San Michele in Padova, which shows a peasant woman feeding a crested hen and her chicks.

The Padovana is described and illustrated as gallina patavina by the Bolognese naturalist Ulisse Aldrovandi in the second part of his work on ornithology, Ornithologiae tomus alter cum indice copiosissimo variarum linguarum, published in Bologna in 1600.

In the twenty-first century, breed numbers remain low. A study published in 2007 used a figure of approximately 1200 for the total breeding stock, of which some 300 were cocks.

== Characteristics ==
Nine colour varieties are recognised for the Padovana, of which six are well-known and documented in older treatises: white, black, silver-laced, gold-laced, buff-laced and "sparrowhawk". The skin is white and the legs slate-coloured or black. The comb is absent and the wattles vestigial; the ear-lobes are small, whitish and completely covered by the crest. Average weight is 1.8–2.3 kg (4–5 lb) for cocks, and 1.5–2.0 kg (3–4 lb) for hens. The eggs vary from cream to light brown, and weigh some 50–60 g.

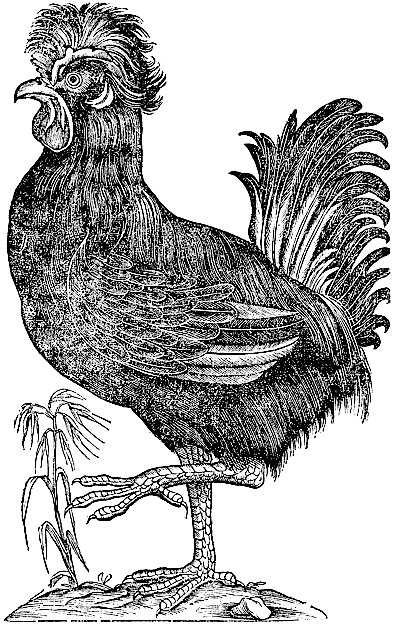
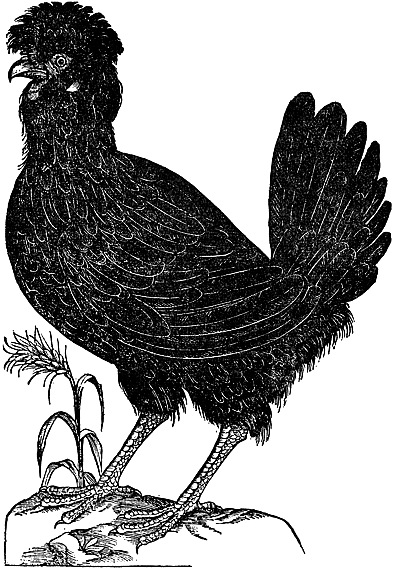
Padovana cock and hen from Ulisse Aldrovandi, Ornithologiae tomus alter, 1600.
