= List of true bantam chicken breeds =

This is a list of the true bantam breeds of chicken, breeds which are naturally small and do not have a corresponding "full-size" version.

| Local name(s) | English name if used | Notes | Image |
|---|---|---|---|
| Barbu d'Anvers; Antwerpse Baardkriel | | Belgium | |
| Barbu d'Everberg; Everbergse Baardkriel | | Belgium | |
| Barbu d'Uccle; Ukkelse Baardkriel | | Belgium | |
| Barbu de Boitsfort; Bosvoordse Baardkriel | | Belgium | |
| Barbu de Grubbe; Grubbe Baardkriel | | Belgium | |
| Barbu de Watermael; Watermaalse Baardkriel | | Belgium | |
| Bassette Liégeoise | | Belgium | |
| Belgisch Kriel; Naine Belge | Belgian Bantam | Belgium | |
| Bleue de Lasnes | | Belgium | |
| Federfüßige Zwerghühner; Sabelpoot | Booted Bantam | | |
| | Burmese | | |
| Hollandse Kriel | Dutch Bantam | Holland | |
| Chabo | Japanese Bantam | Japan | |
| Mericanel della Brianza | | Italy | |
| Mugellese | | Italy | |
| Naine du Tournaisis | | | |
| | Nankin Bantam | | |
| | Nankin Shamo | | |
| Ohiki | | Japan | |
| | Pekin Bantam | | |
| Pépoi | | Italy | |
| Pictave | | France | |
| | Pyncheon | United States | |
| | Rosecomb | | |
| | Sebright | | |
| Serama | | Malaysia | |
| Tuzo | | | |
| Waasse kriel; Naine de Waes | | Belgium | |
| Yakido | | Japan | |
