= Solid black (chicken plumage) =

Chicken plumage color pattern

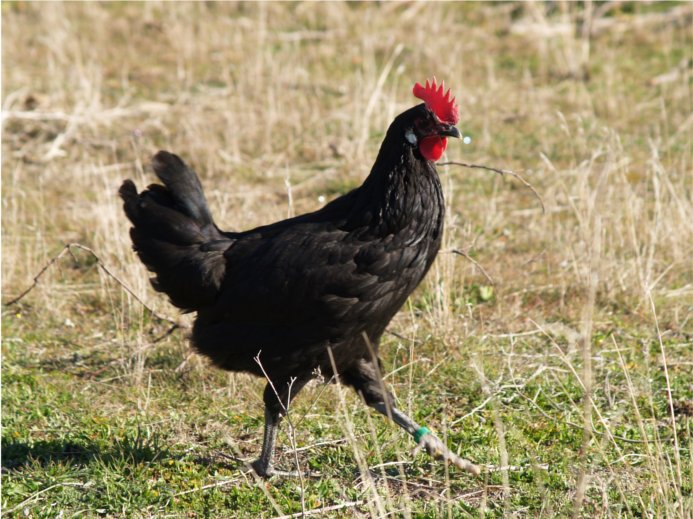
Castilian Black hen, a typical solid black breed.

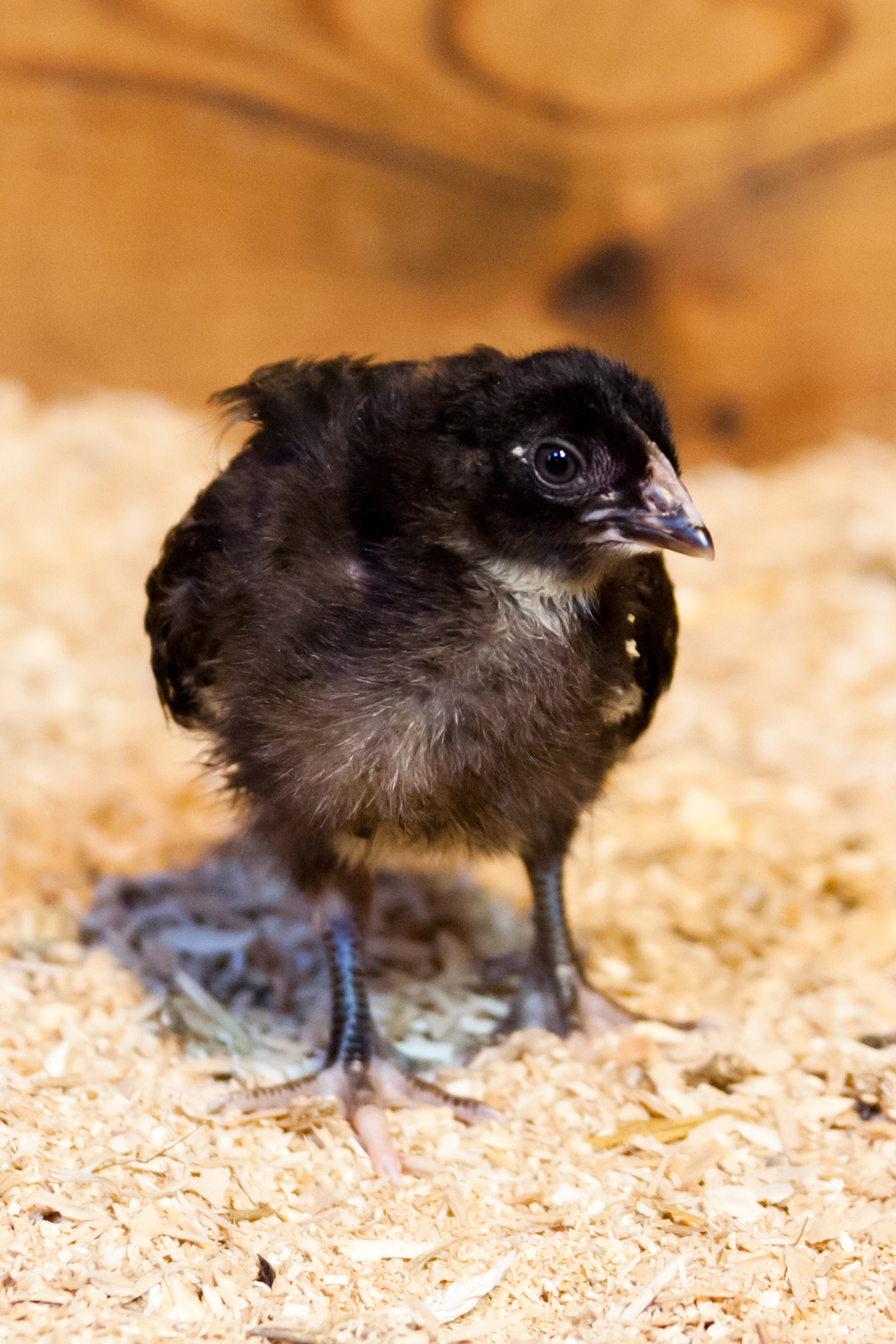
Black chick exhibiting attributes associated with extended black E allele: Black down with grayish white in the ventral surface and black pigment extended to beak, legs and toes.

Solid black plumage color refers to a plumage pattern in chickens (Gallus gallus domesticus) characterized by a uniform, black color across all feathers. There are chicken breeds where the typical plumage color is black, such as Australorp, Sumatra, White-Faced Black Spanish, Jersey Giant and others. And there are many other breeds having different color varieties, which also have an extended black variety, such as Leghorn, Minorca, Wyandotte, Orpington, Langshan and others.

Color is an important feature of most living organisms. In the wild, color has great significance affecting the survival and reproductive success of the species. The environmental constraints which lead to the specific colors of birds and animals are very strong and individuals of novel colors tend not to survive. Under domestication, mankind has transformed all the species involved which have thus been freed from environmental pressures to a large extent. Early color variants were mostly selected for utility reasons or religious practices. In more recent centuries color varieties have been created purely for ornament and pleasure, fashion playing a surprisingly large part in their development. A bewildering array of colors and patterns can now be found in the domestic fowl.

The occurrence of solid or nearly solid colored black plumage is widespread among avian species. Such phenotypes result mostly from single mutations associated with an increase of eumelanin deposition. In the case of the domestic fowl, two genetically different black plumage phenotypes have been described.

== Description ==
=== Chick color ===
Chicks of black plumage varieties are also black, with some black in beaks, legs and dorsal side of the toes, but with a varying degree of white or grayish white in the ventral surface and the tip of the wings. To the naked eye, the length of the down in black chicks is also shorter than that of any other color variety. Juvenile plumage frequently show one or more white feathers.

=== Adult plumage color ===
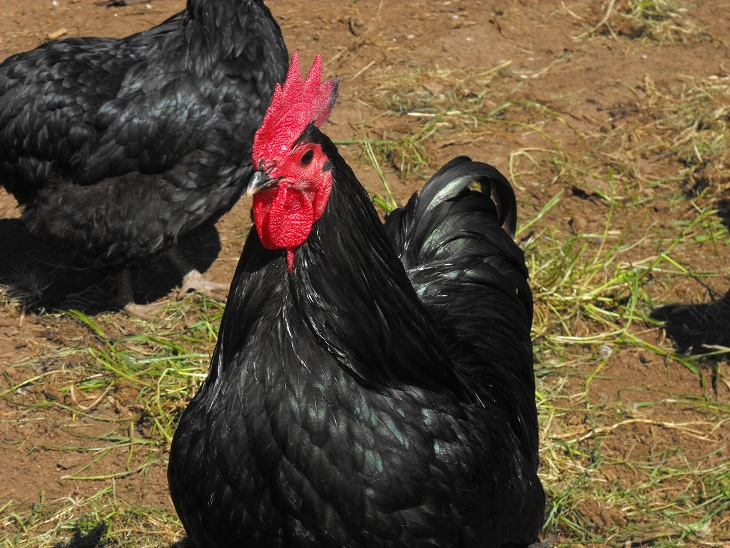
Australorp adult male showing its typical solid black plumage associated with extended black E allele.

Entire surface is pure black due to the presence of eumelanin pigmentation in all parts of the feathers with considerable extension of black pigment to the shanks and beaks. The head, hackle, back, saddle, sickles and wing bows of the may have a beetle-green to purple sheen that may be particularly rich in male birds but still very evident in females. The green and purple sheens are a structural coloration, not pigment. The feathers of chickens and nearly all birds which appear to have green feathers do not have any green pigment. Green pigment has only been found in turacos (Cuculiformes, Musophagidae), small African birds. Structural coloration is produced by the constructive interference of light reflecting from different layers of the structures in feathers.

== History ==
Most chicken plumage color genetic factors were manipulated during domestication by selection and crossings which led to the modern chicken breeds, but there are no historical records of when or where the first solid black chickens arose. In the creation of new black breeds, black colors have been sometimes introduced from breeds of solid black.

Black Cochin or Cochin China breed was originally bred in China and later exported to Britain and America in the mid 19th century. The first specimens came from Shanghai to Europe as a present given to the Queen of the United Kingdom in 1843, and twenty years later they were known in all Europe.

The Langshan breed, a breed of solid black plumage, was also originally bred in China and was first imported to Europe by the Major Croad, of the English Army in 1872. The original Black Orpington was bred by William Cook in 1886 by crossing Minorcas, Langshans and Plymouth Rock to create a new hybrid bird. Cook selected a black bird that would exhibit well by hiding the dirt and soot of London. Australorps were developed in Australia mainly from Black Orpingtons .

Castilian Black, a typical black chicken breed was originally bred in Spain. Plumage is completely black with green sheen in the wing bows. Minorca was later developed in England from imported Castilian fowls of Spain.

Andalusian Blue was very well known and appreciated in Spain at the second half of the 19th century, being present in the Real Botanical Garden of Madrid in 1864. Although not regarded as a solid black plumage breed, but registered by the American Poultry Association as a "blue" breed, it is really a black plumage breed segregating for locus Bl, a mutation that dilutes black to a bluish gray. Only heterozygotes are "blue", so it is impossible to fix the "blue" color plumage. Heterozygotes Bl/bl^{+} individuals have the entire surface of a uniform shade of plain slaty blue, clearly and sharply laced with bluish black. Homozygotes Bl/Bl are white with a faint bluish gray tinge, and blue in feathers with the form of large irregular shaped blobs. And homozygotes bl^{+}/bl^{+} are solid black. The mating of "blue" cocks and hens" give an offspring of black, "blue" and whitish gray tinged fowls in the Mendelian proportion 1:2:1 respectively.

== Genetics of solid black plumage ==
Inheritance of chicken plumage color is complex. It depends on several genetic factors which interact epistatically. Solid black plumage is the result of a combination of genes which interact to give the final result. In plumage, the expression of any color, except white, requires the presence of the allele C (color), an autosomic dominant allele that allows the synthesis of pigment in the feathers.

In the domestic fowl, two black plumage phenotypes have been described. The best known of these is due to the extended black mutation E, which is the most dominant of the multiple alleles at the E locus and is primarily responsible for the completely black plumage of most breeds of fowl.

=== Extended black E mutation ===
E (extended black) is the most dominant allele of an autosomic locus which controls the extension of black to different parts of the plumage. These allele allows the extension of black pigment to the feathers of the whole plumage, producing solid black plumage. It is present not only in most solid black plumage breeds, but also in black barred breeds, such as Barred Rocks, in mottled breeds such as Ancona and some white breeds such as White Leghorns. This mutation is epistatic to many other color patterns based on the recessive alleles of the locus E: Most crossings between solid black plumage fowls and fowls exhibiting other plumage patterns, give a solid black plumage offspring. But E is also hypostatic to a type of white: Crossings between Black Australorps and White Leghorns, which are so popular in many countries to produce egg layers, give an offspring of nearly white plumage.

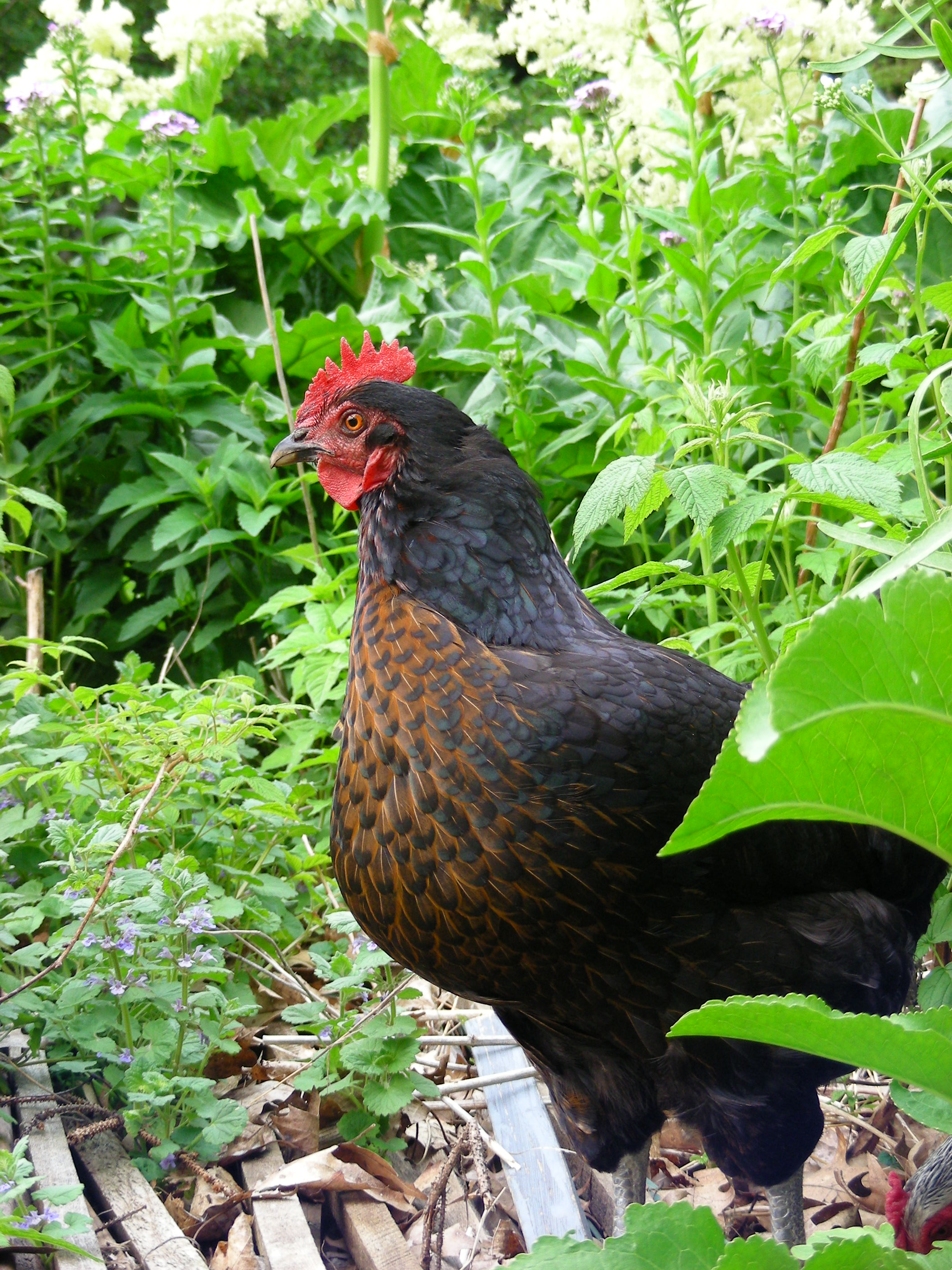
Sex link black hen obtained from the mating of Rhode Island Red males with Barred Rock females

Otherwise, non-black fowls may have black offspring too: The popular cross between Rhode Island Red males and Barred Rock females, commonly employed to obtain hybrid brown egg layers, such as ISA Brown, gives solid black females with a few brushstrokes of red in the chest.

A few other color genes affect the expression of the extended black E mutation reducing the amount of black in all, or some parts of the feathers:

- Bl (blue) as in Andalusian Blue
- mo (mottling)- Autosomal recessive. In homozygosis makes a small V-shaped white tip every two-four feathers, producing a mottled or pied plumage, as in Ancona or Exchequer Leghorn.
- "B" (barred)- Sex linked. It produces regular parallel black and white alternating bars over the entire plumage, giving the so-called "cuckoo" plumage as in Barred Rock or in California Gray. Females are always a darker shade than males.
- I (inhibitor of black)- Autosomal dominant. It produces a solid white plumage as in White Leghorn or in Rhode Island White.

=== Melanotic Ml mutation ===
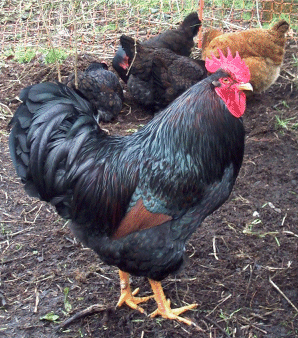
Barnevelder cock exhibiting a nearly black plumage associated with melanotic Ml mutation in homozygosity.

A second black or nearly all black adult phenotype but with little eumelanin in the shanks and beak, has been described. This mutation, unlike E has no influence on down coloration. But is responsible for the extension of black pigment into the normally red areas of red-zone fowl interacting with the other alleles at the E locus. This autosomic mutation is Ml (melanotic) and its expression varies however with the E allele present.

In other words, Ml interacts with the recessive alleles of the E allelic series which normally produce non-solid black plumage, "extending" black to zones which otherwise would be of some other color. This gene has little or none effect on the chick down color nor extends black to the shanks.

Ml was incorporated by selection during the fixation of the black color of some breeds to reinforce the processes leading to completely black plumage. Its presence has been confirmed in Black Minorca, Laced Cochin, Laced Wyandotte and in White Crested Black Polish (chicken), although the latter has not a solid black plumage, but a white crest instead. Presence of Ml was also confirmed in Castilian Black and in Double-Laced Barnevelder where only the females show double-laced pattern whereas males are melanized black-breasted reds.

==== Homozygotes Ml/Ml ====
Homozygotes Ml/Ml are nearly all black especially in combination with some recessive alleles of the E allelic series such as e^{b} (brown) and e^{+} (wild type), except that females with e^{+} are black with salmon breasts, while females with e^{Wh} are wheaten with dark brown back and hackle. Males are nearly all black.

==== Heterozygotes Ml/ml^{+} ====
Melanotic Ml in single dose has little or no effect on plumage color in combination with e^{Wh} in females. Heterozygotes Ml/ml^{+} have black head and hackle in combination with e^{b} and e^{+} but little effect on e^{Wh} females. It is difficult to distinguish the heterozygous males from the wild type but the black head and hackle of the heterozygous females is quite obvious. Melanotic is considered incompletely dominant because heterozygotes are unlike either homozygote.

== Breeds better known by their black variety ==
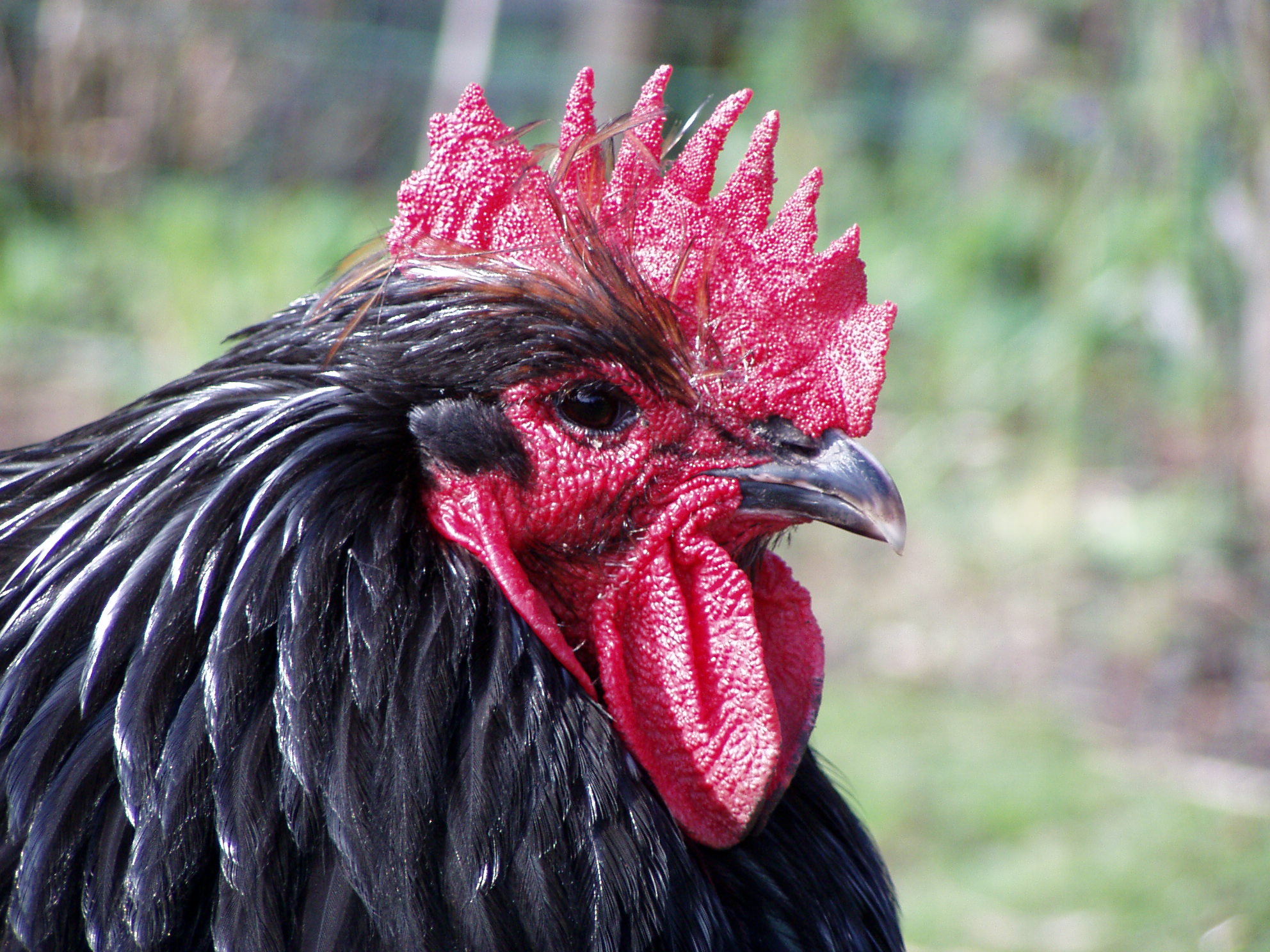
Black Orpington rooster

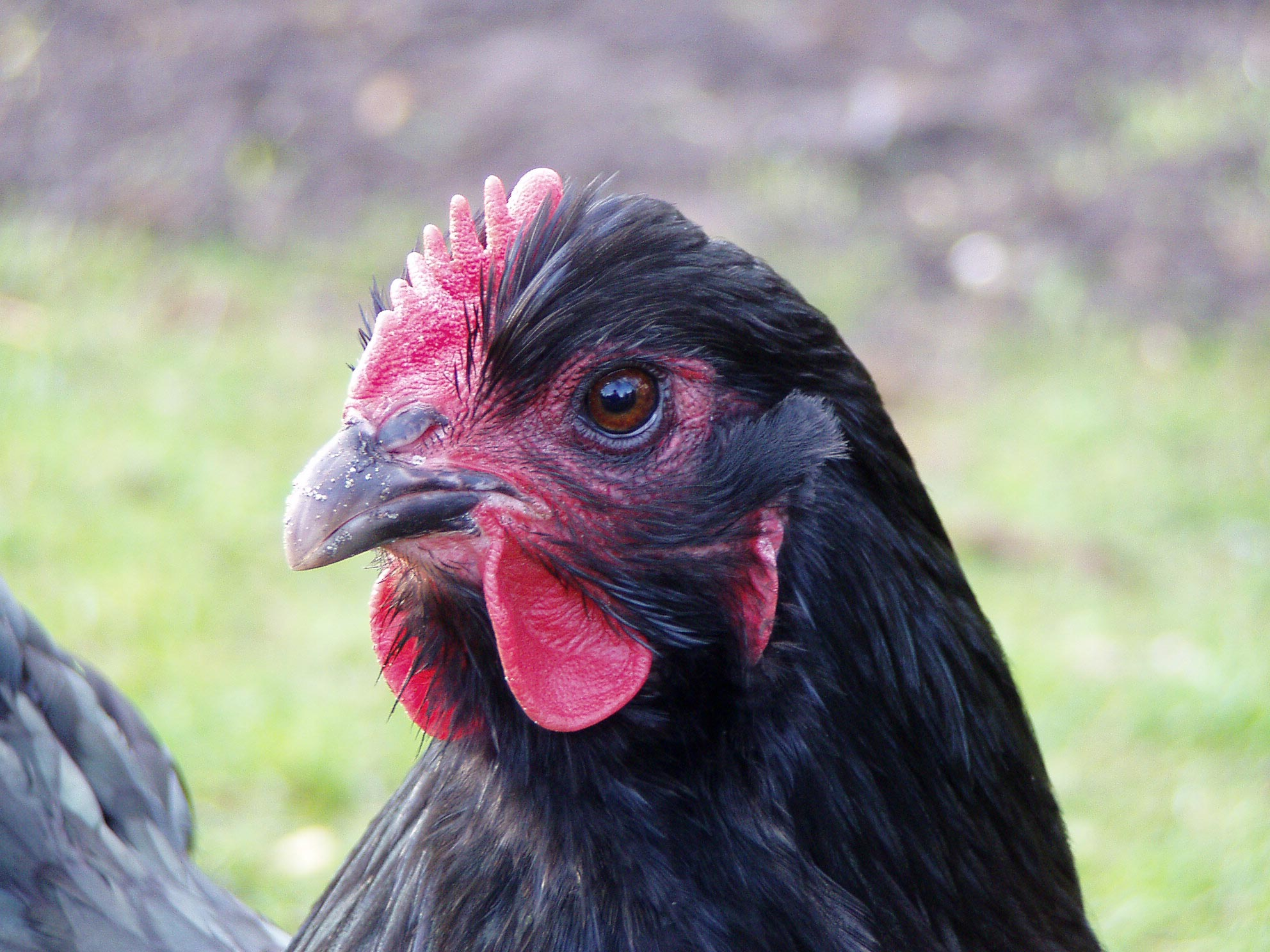
Black Orpington hen

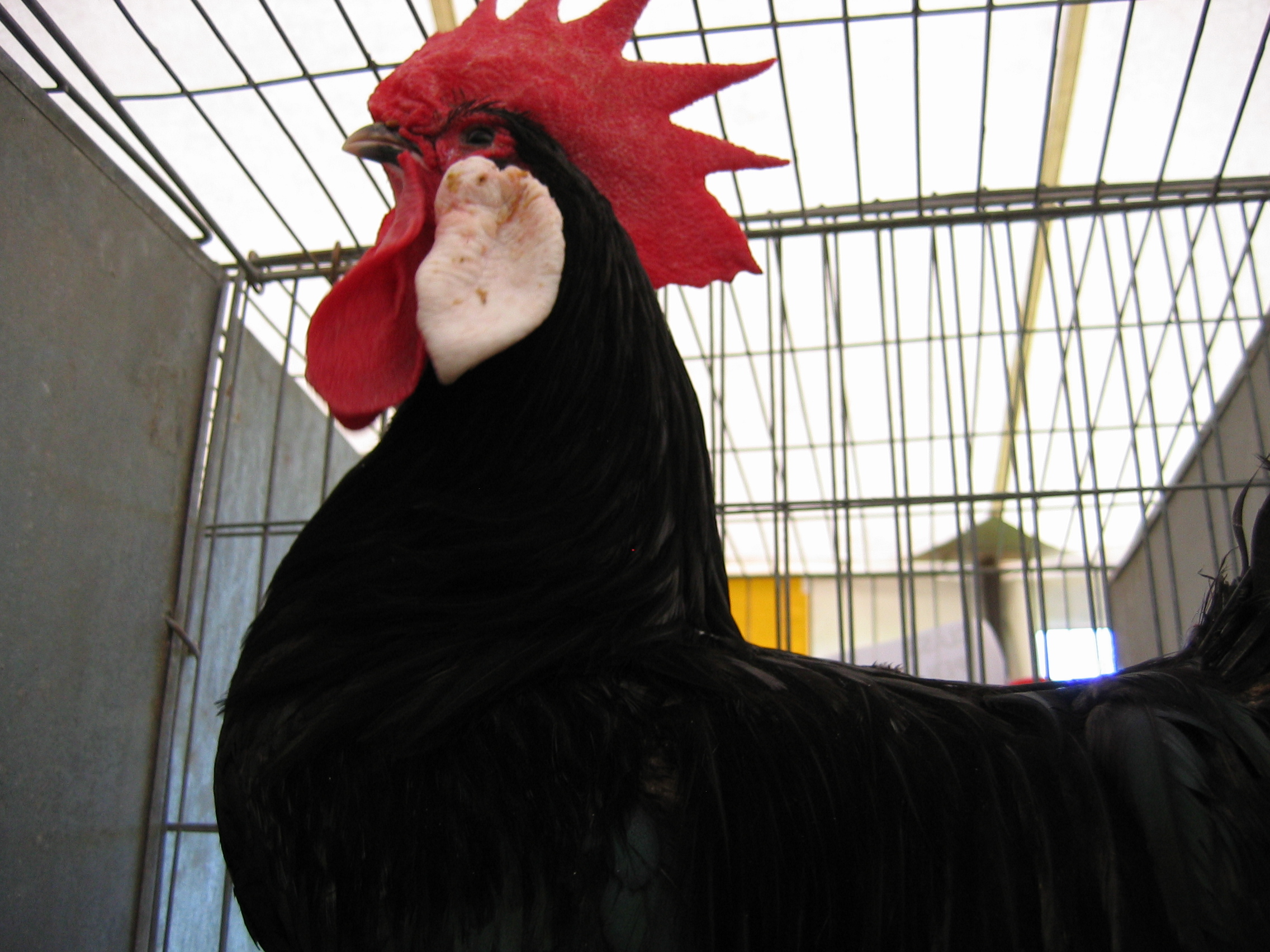
Black Minorca rooster

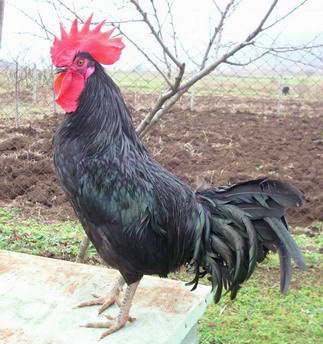
Black Shumen rooster

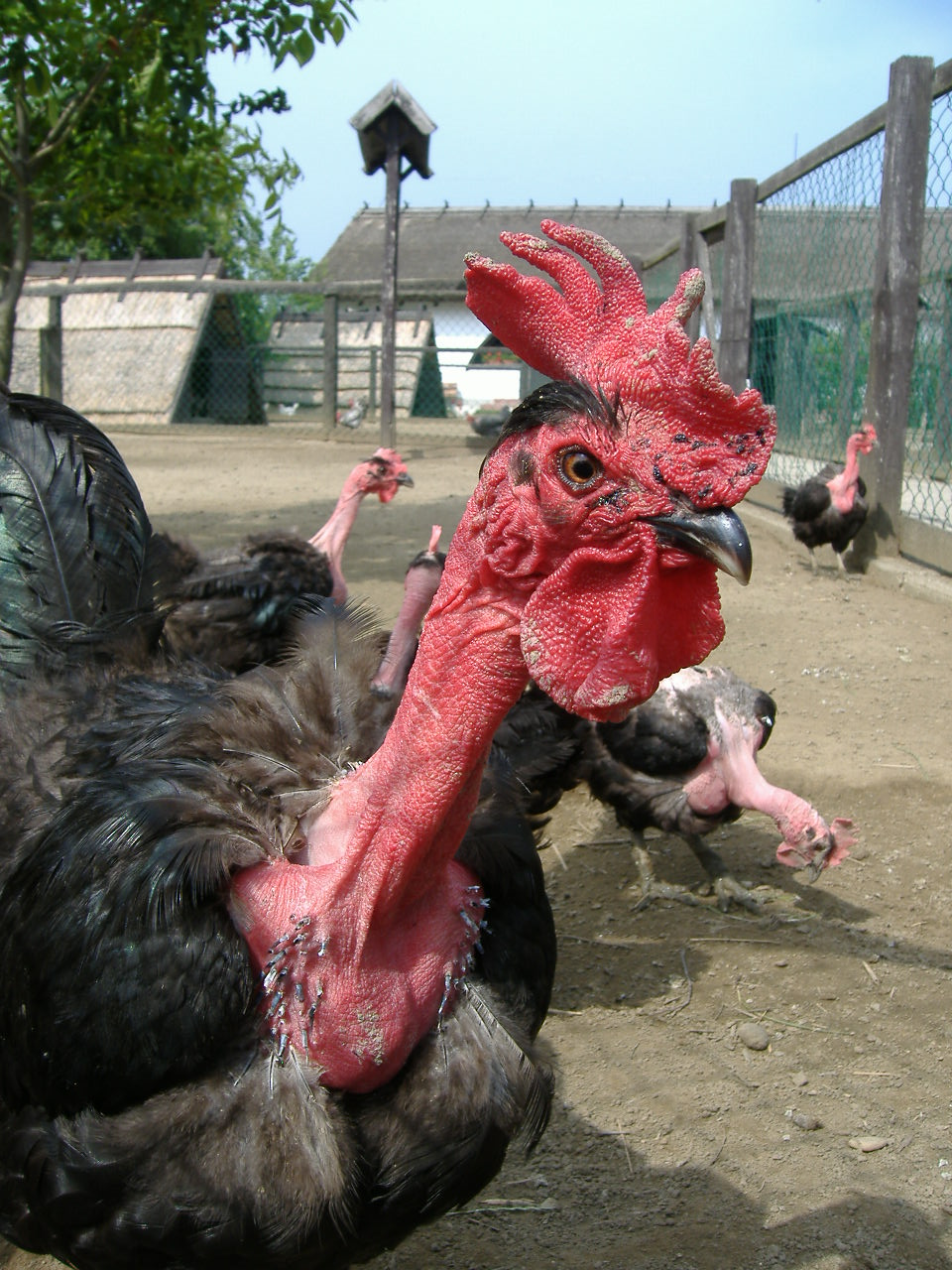
Transylvanian Naked Neck rooster

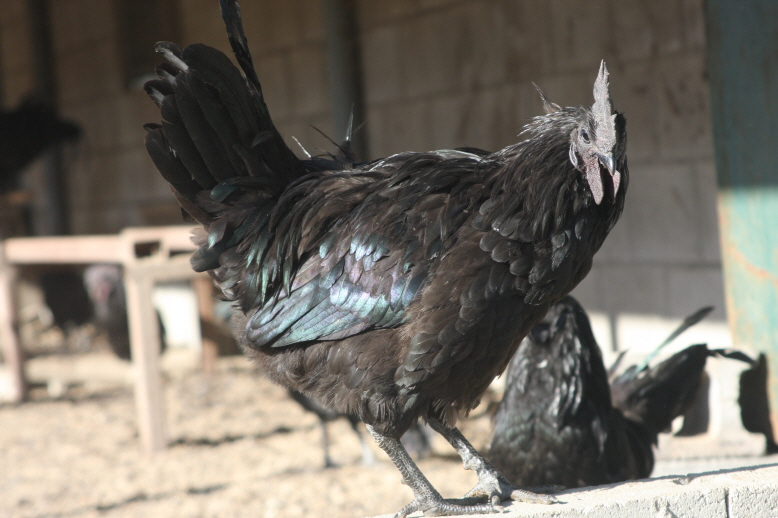
Ogye rooster

- Australorp
- Breda
- Castilian Black
- Cubalaya
- Crevecoeur
- Jersey Giant
- La Flèche
- Minorca
- Ogye
- Sumatra
- Transsylvanian Naked-neck
- Utrerana Negra
- White-Faced Black Spanish

== Breeds having varieties of black plumage ==
- Andalusian
- Aseel Rampur
- Araucana
- Ausburger
- Barnevelder
- Belgian Bearded d'Anvers bantam
- Belgian Bearded d'Uccle bantam
- Bergische Schlotterkamm bantam
- Black Shumen
- Booted Bantam
- Burmese bantam
- Cochin
- Dutch bantam
- Faverolles
- Frizzle (the term can also describe the frizzle plumage type as well as this specific breed)
- Andalusian Blue (article in Spanish)
- Hamburg
- Java
- Korean Native chicken
- Langshan
- Leghorn
- Modern Game
- Naked-neck
- Old English Game
- Orpington
- Plymouth Rock
- Polish
- Schamoo
- Shumen
- Silkie
- Wyandotte

== Other species ==
=== Turkeys ===
Solid black plumage is controlled by B (black), an autosomal dominant allele in the triple allelic b'^{+} series. It produces an entire plumage black with a bright metallic sheen.

=== Japanese quail ===
Solid black plumage is controlled by E (extended black), an autosomal incomplete dominant allele in its allelic series. It extends black and dark brown pigment throughout the plumage.

== See also ==
- Lavender (chicken plumage)
- Solid white (chicken plumage)
- List of chicken colours
- List of chicken breeds
