= Lavender (chicken plumage) =

Chicken plumage color pattern

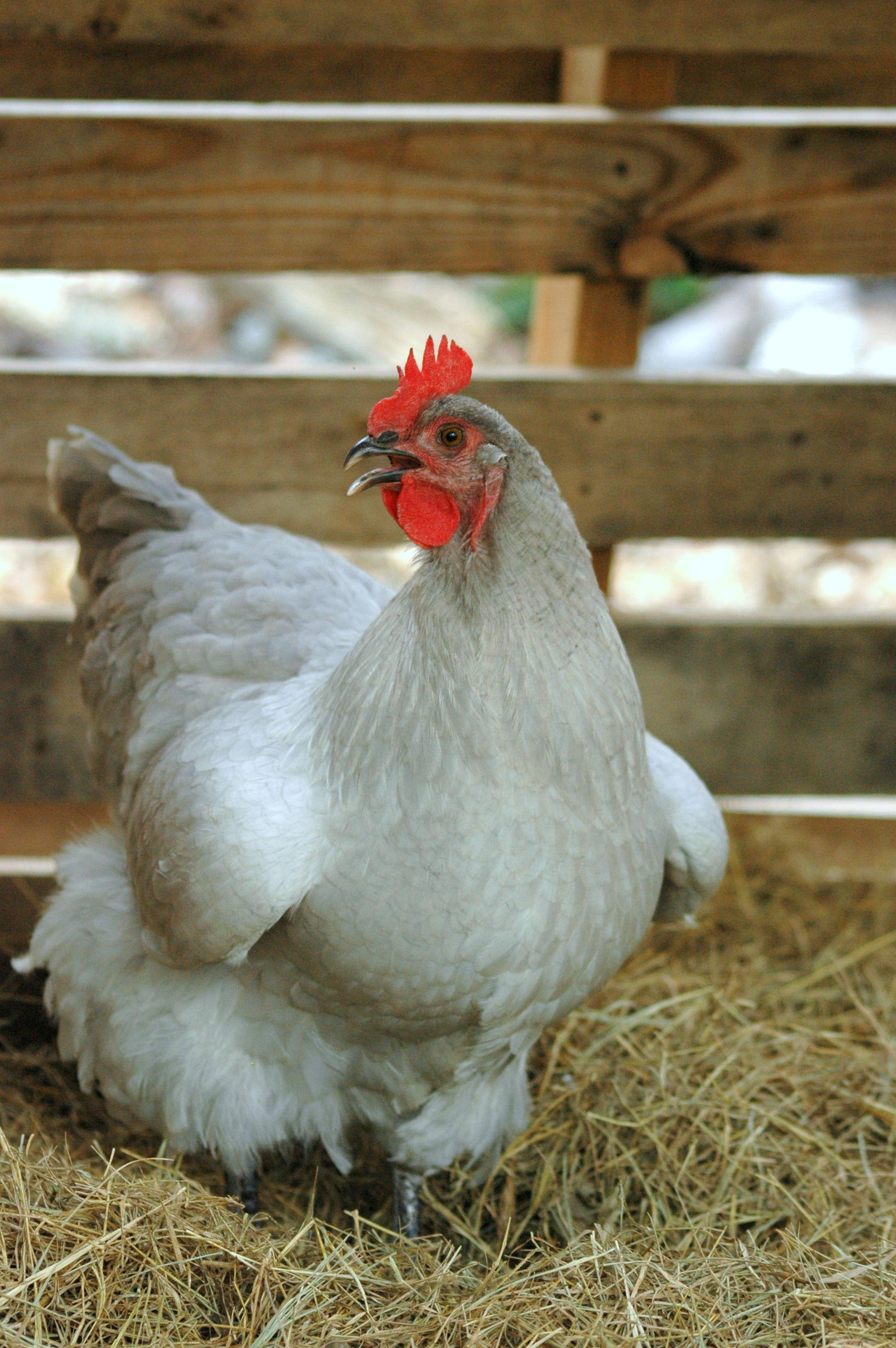
Orpington hen exhibiting typical self-blue plumage due to lavender (lav) gene on black background.

Lavender or self-blue refers to a plumage color pattern in the chicken (Gallus gallus domesticus) characterized by a uniform, pale bluish grey color across all feathers. The distinctive color is caused by the action of an autosomal recessive gene, commonly designated as "lav", which reduces the expression of eumelanin and phaeomelanin so that black areas of the plumage appear pale grey instead, and red areas appear a pale buff.

== Description ==
The "lavender" gene (lav) in the chicken causes the dilution of both black (eumelanin) and red/brown (phaeomelanin) pigments, so according to color background, dilution due to "lavender" gives a sort of plumage color patterns: On an extended black background, this condition causes the entire surface of the body an even shade of light slaty blue, which is the typical phenotype known as '"self-blue"'.

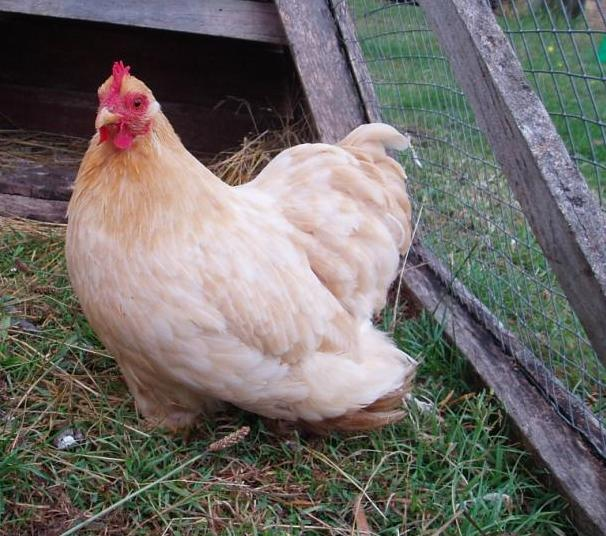
Pekin Bantam hen exhibiting the effect of lavender on a red plumage background

On a red/brown color plumage background, lavender gene degrades color to beige, like in some Pekin Bantams as in the picture set aside. On the color background of the Belgian Bearded d'Uccle Bantams, frequently referred to as the "Mille Fleur" in the United States, lavender causes the pattern known as "porcelain". The resulting "porcelain" pattern is beige with each feather tipped with a V-shaped of slate blue near the end of the feather and the feather tipped with a V-shaped white spangle.

Light and electron microscope studies have revealed that, although lavender melanocytes possess relatively normal dendrite morphology, there is defective peripheral accumulation of melanosomes to the dendrites. This results in the patchy transfer of melanosomes into the keratinocytes of the growing feather. The dilution effect is essentially the result of a mixture of pigmented and unpigmented regions within the feather barbs.

== History ==
The lavender gene was first discovered in the Porcelain variety of Belgian Bearded d'Uccle bantams in 1972, and verified in 1980. Porcelain colored d'Uccle bantams were around as early as 1909, though the Porcelain variety was not recognized by the American Poultry Association until 1964. Whether from the Porcelain d'Uccle or other, unknown sources, the lavender gene has been introduced to a number of new chicken breeds over the years, including the Polish and the Silkie.

== Genetic studies ==
"Lavender" is an autosomal recessive mutation of the chicken affecting the neural crest derived melanocytes. It causes the dilution of both eumelanin and phaeomelanin to a light grey or buff, respectively. It has been assigned the symbol lav.

The ultimate goal of the modern genetic studies is to find out the underlying genes involved in these traits. Lavender in chickens has been found to be a mutation caused by a single base-pair change in exon 1 of MLPH (melanophilin) gene.

In genetic linkage studies, Lav locus has been assigned to a linkage group known as Cp-R-U group (Creeper-Rose comb-Uropygial). Although Lavender locus is linked to the R (rose comb) locus by 32.5%, its position has not yet been mapped.

== Homologous mutations in other species ==
Until now, all the reported causal mutations in MLPH (melanophilin) of humans, mice, and other species have been single-base substitutions or small deletions, the effects of which were limited to the dilution of hair or feather colour. The MLPH-associated dilution of coat or plumage pigmentation should then result in the defective transport of melanosomes. This produces a diluted, leaden or lavender blue-grey colour and has been reported in several mammals: humans (Griscelli syndrome type 3), mice, cats, dogs and minks.

=== In Japanese quail ===
The lavender phenotype in Japanese quail (Coturnix coturnix japonica) is a dilution of both eumelanin and phaeomelanin in feathers that produces a blue-grey colour on a wild-type feather pattern background. Studies of intergeneric hybridization proved that the lavender mutation in quail is homologous to the same phenotype in chickens.

In this species, the lavender phenotype is associated with a non-lethal complex mutation involving three consecutive overlapping chromosomal changes (two inversions and one deletion) that have consequences on the genomic organization of four genes (MLPH and the neighbouring PRLH, RAB17 and LRRFIP1). The deletion of PRLH has no effect on the level of circulating prolactin. Lavender birds have lighter body weight, lower body temperature and increased feed consumption and residual feed intake than wild-type plumage quail, indicating that this complex mutation is affecting the metabolism and the regulation of homeothermy.

=== In other bird species ===
In other bird species, similar feather colour dilutions have been described, including the autosomal recessive slate turkey (Meleagris gallopavo), milky pigeon (Columba livia), and the lavender muscovy duck (Cairina moschata). It is not yet known which genes are responsible for these dilution mutations in these bird species.

== Chicken breeds with "lavender" varieties ==
- Araucana
- Belgian Bearded d'Anvers (Self-blue and Porcelain phases)
- Belgian Bearded d'Uccle Bantam
- Belgian d'Everberg
- Booted Bantam (also called Dutch Booted Bantam)
- Dutch Bantam
- Old English Game Bantam
- Orpington
- Pekin (chicken)
- Silkie
- Wyandottes, in the UK as recently as 2014

== See also ==
- Solid black (chicken plumage)
- Solid white (chicken plumage)
- List of chicken breeds
- List of chicken colours
