= Belgian bantam =

Belgian bantam may refer to:

The breeds of chicken collectively standardised as Belgian Bantam in the United States, Australia and United Kingdom (but classified separately elsewhere).

- Barbu d'Anvers
- Barbu d'Everberg
- Barbu d'Uccle
- Barbu de Grubbe
- Barbu de Watermael
- Barbu de Boitsfort

Or

- Belgian Bantam (Naine belge)

== See also ==
- Dutch Bantam
- List of Belgian chicken breeds
