= Solid white (chicken plumage) =

Breed of chicken

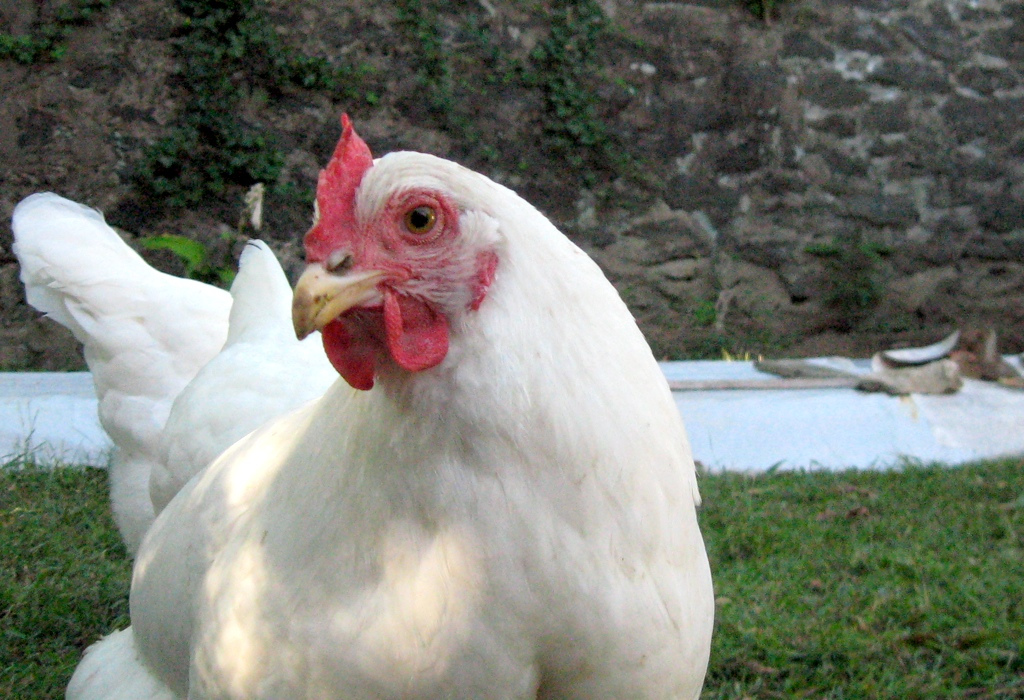
A Rhode Island white hen displaying the "dominant white" plumage color genotype.

In poultry standards, solid white is coloration of plumage in chickens (Gallus gallus domesticus) characterized by a uniform pure white color across all feathers, which is not generally associated with depigmentation in any other part of the body.

Color is an important feature of most living organisms. In the wild, color has great significance affecting the survival and reproductive success of the species. The environmental constraints which lead to the specific colors of birds and animals are very strong and individuals of novel colors tend not to survive. Under domestication, mankind has transformed all the species involved which have thus been freed from environmental pressures to a large extent. Early color variants were mostly selected for utility reasons or religious practices. In more recent centuries color varieties have been created purely for ornament and pleasure, fashion playing a surprisingly large part in their development. A bewildering array of colors and patterns can now be found in the domestic fowl. In the last decades white plumage color has become essential for the efficient processing of broilers and most types of meat-type poultry. Slaughterhouses and meat processing plants require poultry with a white or very light undercolor to produce carcasses without the typical "hair", which colored chickens have, that necessitates singeing after plucking.

There are several chicken breeds having solid white as the most typical plumage color, such as Leghorn, Dorking, Bresse Gauloise, Polish, Wyandotte and others. And there are many other breeds better known by their colored varieties, which also have a solid white variety, such as Plymouth Rock, Orpington, Rhode Island Red, Jersey Giant and others.

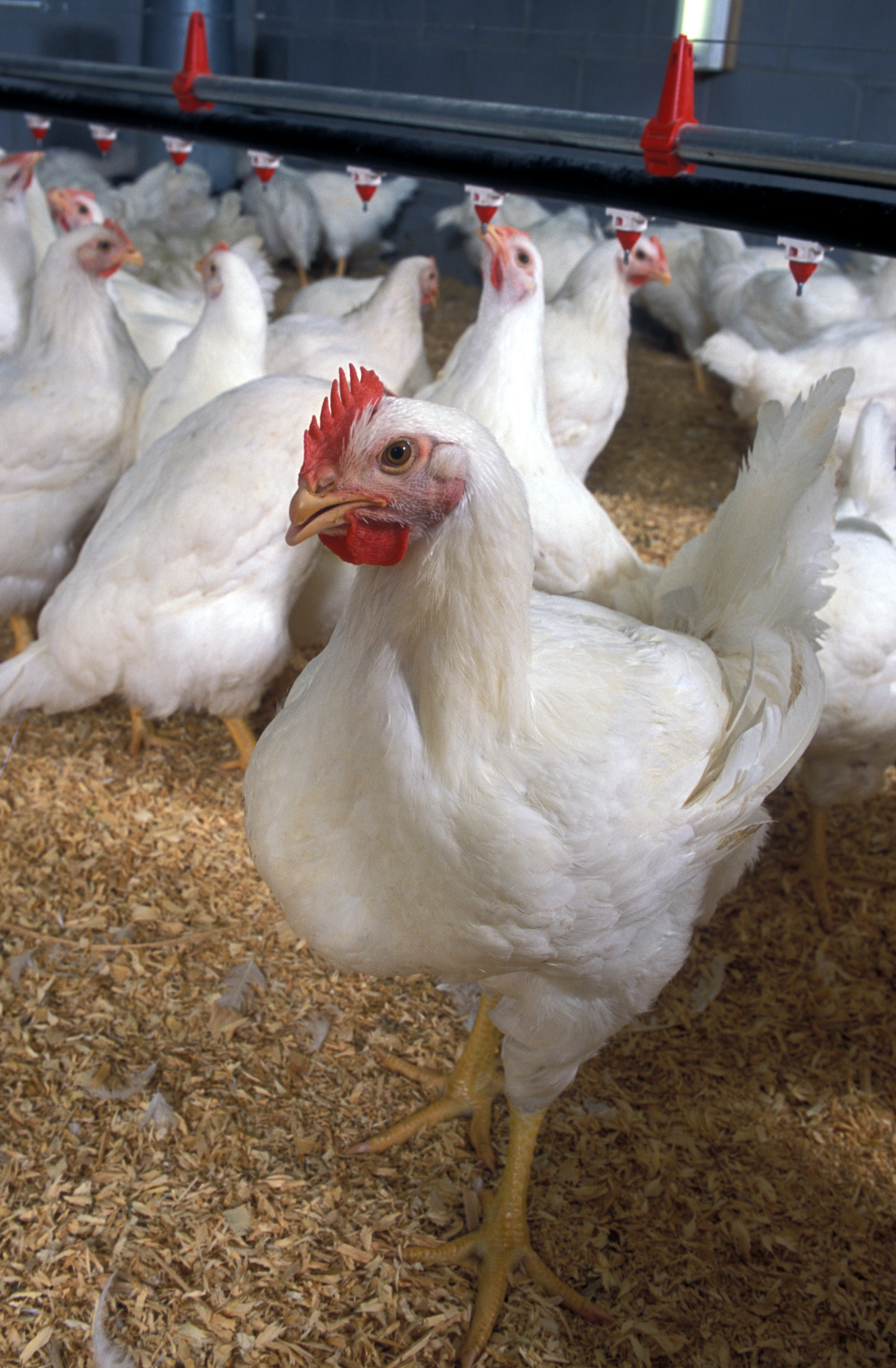
Broiler chickens exhibiting their typical solid white plumage color

== Description ==
Chicks down color of solid white chicken breeds can vary from a light creamy white, through different yellow shades, to a toasted orange. In adult phase, the entire surface of the plumage is pure white due to the absence of melanin pigmentation in all parts of the feathers. The absence of melanin in the plumage of solid white chicken breeds does not affect other body structures, except in the case of the albinos, which are easily recognized by their pink eye color.

== History ==
Most chicken plumage color genetic factors were manipulated during domestication by selection and crossings, which led to the modern chicken breeds, but there are no historical records of when or where the first chicken breeds with solid white plumage arose. In the creation of new white breeds, white color have been sometimes introduced from breeds of solid white plumage. Rhode Island White arose from the work of J. Alonzo Jocoy of Peacedale, Rhode Island, which began in 1888. Developed through crosses of Partridge Cochins, White Wyandottes, and the rose comb type of White Leghorn, it was solidified as a breed by 1903. And it was first accepted into the American Poultry Association's Standard of Perfection in 1922. Moderately popular up until the 1960s, it is now a relatively rare fowl.

On the other hand, there is not a unique genetic mutation for solid white plumage color. There are two very well known autosomal major mutations leading to solid white plumage color, but also a number of complementary mutations properly combined may reduce or restrict pigment with a sufficient intensity to produce a final solid white plumage color, even in the absence of the major mutations for white. Most varieties of solid white plumage chickens belong to some of the first two major mutations leading to solid white plumage color. These are commonly regarded as "dominant white" and "recessive white" according to the major mutation involved. The term "dominant white" has also been applied in genetic literature to a mutation producing white coat color in horses.

Four different recessive albino or albino-like mutations which also produce white plumage color in the chicken were also reported in literature, but those are not typical of any breed of chicken, and may be associated to a reduced perinatal viability or a deficient vision.

=== Dominant white ===
Dominant white was one of the first traits in aviculture which proved to be inherited according to the Mendelian laws, when in 1902 Bateson found that the cross of White Leghorns x Indian Games (or its reciprocal) gives F1 chicks with a white or a black spotted ashy white down. And that the F2 gives light and dark chicks in the 3:1 Mendelian proportion, which was confirmed by Hurst in 1905, Bateson and Punnet in 1906 and many others. The symbol I (inhibitor of black) to identify this mutation was introduced by Hadley in 1913. Although homozygotes I/I have always a solid white plumage color, heterozygous I/i^{+} chicks are generally black spotted, while the presence of black or partially black feathers on a whitish adult plumage is very common.

=== Recessive white ===
Solid white varieties of Dorkings, Plymouth Rocks, Wyandottes, Minorcas, Orpingtons and other breeds are regarded as recessive whites because their white is completely recessive to any other color. Both kinds of white plumage: "dominant white" and "recessive white" are phenotypically identical in adult phase, and can only be distinguished from each other by means of a progeny test. In 1906 and 1908 Bateson and Punnet demonstrated that White Dorkings are homozygous for an autosomal recessive mutation which prevents appearance of color. They assigned to this mutation the symbol c, as being recessive from the normal allele (C^{+}, chromogen) which allows normal plumage color development. This same kind of white plumage color was found by Bateson and Punnet in Rose Comb Bantam and in White Wyandotte. It was also found in White Cochin by Davenport in 1906, in White Langshan by Goodale in 1910, in White Plymouth Rock by Hadley in 1914, and in other breeds.

"Recessive white" chickens may be potentially black barred or of some other color pattern, but does not reveal this, unless they are submitted to a progeny test. White Plymouth Rock chickens carry a considerable mixture of genes taken from other breeds different from the original Barred Plymouth Rock from which the white variety originates.

=== Albinism and partial albinism ===
Dominant and recessive major solid white plumage varieties are not albinos, but just white chickens in which melanin is limited to eyes. In the ornithological literature there are many reports about totally or partially albino birds, but most of them are not studied genetically.

In 1933 Warren described in White Wyandotte a kind of complete albinism caused by an autosomal recessive mutation to which he assigned the symbol a. As the White Wyandotte birds were of a solid white plumage color, albinos could only be recognized by the brilliant red of their eyes. Those albinos had such a deficient vision that newborn chicks had difficulties to find the feeders, while adult females had difficulties to find the provided trap-nests . They were all very sensitive to sun light and preferred to remain indoors.

Light microscopic histology of the retinal pigment epithelium of autosomal albinos was done in the original study by Warren, but subsequent light or electron microscopic studies of autosomal albino eyes or feathers have not been reported. The histology of the iris showed no evidence of pigmentation. At the ultra-structural level, small, spherical, poorly pigmented granules were seen in autosomal albino retinal melanocytes.

In 1940 Warren described a different autosomal recessive mutation known as "pink eye" (pk) that severely reduce pigmentation in the eyes, but only dilutes the pigment in the plumage, so this mutation does not produce a solid white color. The ultra-structure of "pink eye" melanocytes from both the eyes and feathers of embryo chicks and adults has been extensively defined.

In 1941 Mueller and Hutt reported a sex-linked partial albinism in Barred Plymouth Rock due to a simple sex-linked recessive mutation. The same mutation was later found in another flock of Barred Rocks and in White Leghorn. Affected birds had as good vision as normal ones.

In 1983 Brumbaugh, Bargar and Oetting reported a third recessive allele at the C pigment locus, to which they assigned the symbol c^{a}. This allele in homozygous individuals produces a kind of partial albinism. Concomitant electron microscope studies of both retinal and feather melanocytes showed that both mutant alleles c and c^{a} are citochemically tyrosinase negative, possess hypertrophied Golgi systems and contain numerous vesicles that appear to be incompletely formed, unpigmented granules. Retinal melanocytes possess a few pigmented granules, more in recessive white (c) cells than in albino (c^{a}) cells. At the ultra-structural level, small, spherical, poorly pigmented granules were seen in autosomal albino retinal melanocytes. This explains the gradual but slight darkening of the eyes as a bird matures. Both variants are citochemically tyrosinase negative. Late embryonic mortality is higher in c^{a}/c^{a} homozygous individuals. Albinos exhibit shorter down length, reflecting a general state of immaturity and retardation of neonatal development, higher incidence of subcutaneous haemorrhage and inflammation, increased incidence of yolk sac protrusion and slower growth rate and smaller body size than colored chickens. Mortality in albinos is also significantly higher, feed consumption and feed utilization is reduced.

The numerous alterations associated with partial albinism in the fowl are difficult to explain merely considering C locus only the structural gene of tyrosinase. This locus may provide broader regulatory function instead. In the opinion of the scientists, it may exist additional physiological functions for melanin/functional tyrosinase that are not involved with pigmentation.

== Genetics of solid white plumage ==
Inheritance of chicken plumage color is complex. It depends on several genetic factors which interact epistatically. Genetic symbology for most color plumage mutations can be found in Hutt's classical book of poultry genetics published in 1949, in Abbott and Yee's Handbook published in 1975 and in Some's alphabetical list of genes issued in 1980.

=== Recessive white (c) ===
Solid white plumage is the result of several combinations of genes which interact to give the final result. The expression of any color, except white, requires the presence of the normal allele C^{+}, an autosomic dominant allele that allows the synthesis of pigment in the feathers. C^{+} is the most dominant of the allelic series of the locus C with the following order of dominance:

C^{+} (colored) > c (recessive white) > c^{a} (partial albinism)

But C^{+} is not completely dominant over c . In 1979 Carefoot found that in certain genetic backgrounds homozygous C^{+}/C^{+} can be distinguished from the heterozygous C^{+}/c

Recessive white is one of the two major causes of white plumage color. Most solid white chicken breeds are pure for recessive white c allele. c in homozygosity produces solid white plumage color in all individuals.

=== Dominant white (I) ===
A few breeds such as White Leghorn and Hamburg have a "dominant white" I mutation for plumage color. This mutation selectively inhibits black color and dilutes red color in the feathers. So, it is also known as "inhibitor of black". It is less effective in heterozygotes, having poor effect on red but reducing black to just a few ticks and spots. In other words, homozygous I/I chickens have solid white plumage regardless of the other major or complementary mutations present in the individuals, but without effect on the melanin of the eye. "Dominant white" is also frequent in breeds which are habitually "recessive white", such as White Minorca, White Wyandotte and White Plymouth Rock. Heterozygous I/i^{+} individuals show a drastic reduction of black in the plumage, but only a slight reduction of red pigment. While homozygous i^{+}/i^{+} individuals may be of any color if also carry the C^{+} allele which allows the normal expression of color Because of the ineffectiveness of I to reduce red pigment, it can go unnoticed in breeds with buff plumage color. In 1933 Danforth could extract the "dominant white" allele from Buff Leghorns and Buff Minorcas which showed no sign of having this mutation. As in both breeds it was not evident the presence of "dominant white" mutation, the results were completely unexpected until its revelation by the progeny tests. The presence of the "dominant white" from White Leghorn is due to previously made crossings with the intention to introduce some of the desirable qualities of this breed.

=== Disadvantages associated with recessive white ===
Since 1959 it had been reported that recessive white c allele in homocygosis significantly reduces body growth rate and body size in a magnitude of 4-10%. This was later confirmed in meat-type chickens by the researches of Fox and Smyth, and in egg-type breeds by the research of Mèrat and coworkers. This is a serious drawback to the poultry meat-type production which remains unsolved to the present day. A white or very light undercolor is essential for the efficient processing of broilers and decrepit layers in slaughterhouses and meat processing plants, however White Plymouth Rock, a typical "recessive white" breed, continues to be used as the female side of most commercial broiler crosses, while White Cornish continues to be used as the male side. As a result, most modern broiler chickens are homozygous c/c. It is of importance to the meat breeding industry to know the magnitude of the depression in growth rate caused by the recessive white genotype in the commercial stocks. Also, several other pigment dilution genes, have been reported to depress growth rate. The experimental results of Fox and Smyth in 1985 also proved that c (recessive white) and I (dominant white) do not act in additive manner in influencing growth rate, and more importantly, the depression observed for "recessive white" was not enhanced by the presence of "dominant white" (I). As part of the future strategy of the genetic work on the parent stocks of the male side It would not be necessary to eliminate segregating "dominant white" from recessive white lines, but it would be economically advantageous to remove "recessive white" from the male lines.

== White chicken breeds with "dominant white" ==
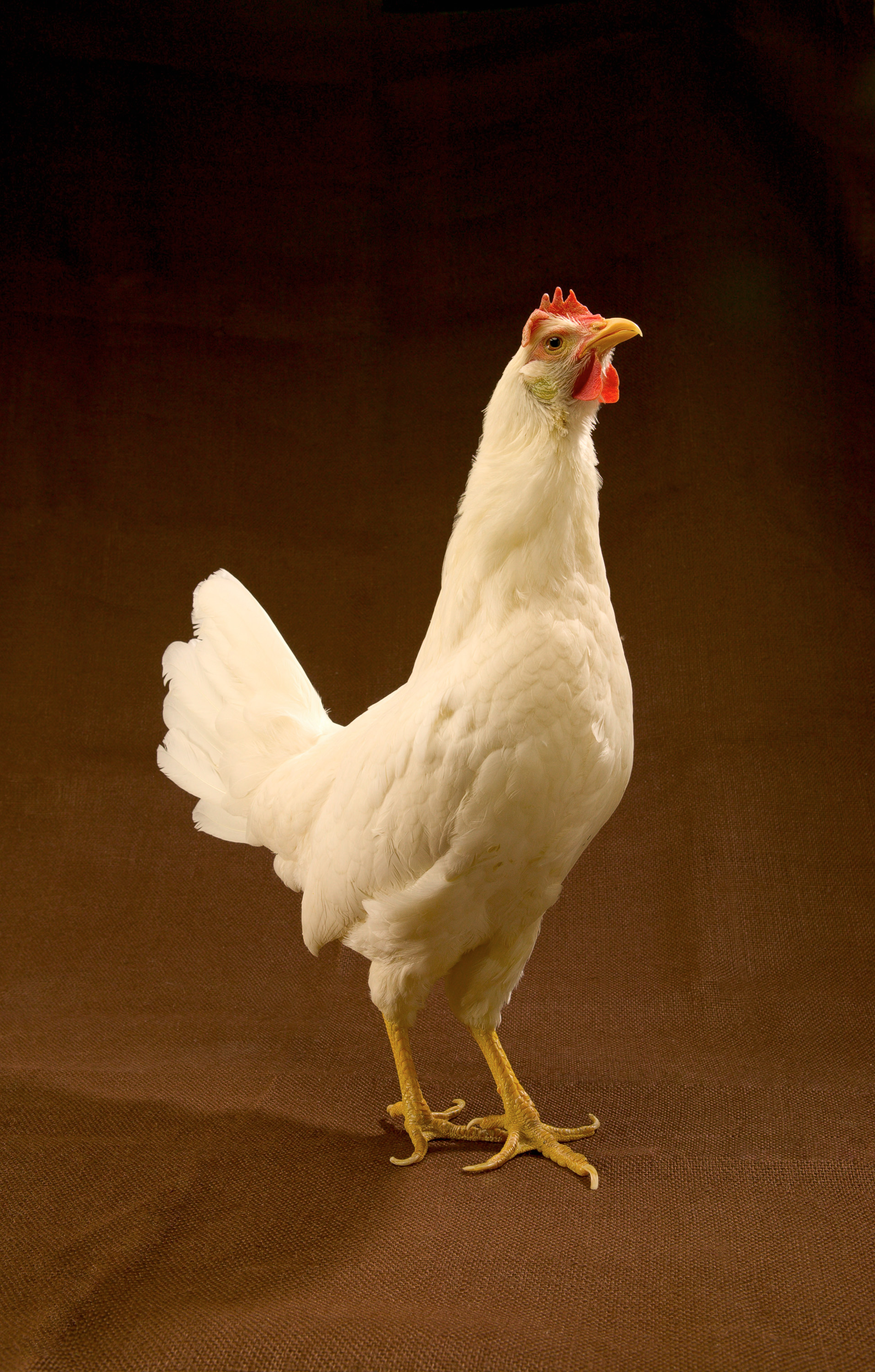
White Leghorn A typical "dominant white" breed.

- Brahma, white, regular and bantam
- Belgian Bearded d'Anvers bantam, white
- Hamburg white (a rare breed)
- La Bresse
- Leghorn white; regular single-comb, bantam single-comb, and regular rose-comb
- Minorca, white; single- and rose-comb
- Modern Game, white, regular and bantam
- Polish white; regular and bantam; both bearded and non-bearded in both sizes
- Rhode Island White, normal and rose-comb

== White chicken breeds with "recessive white" ==
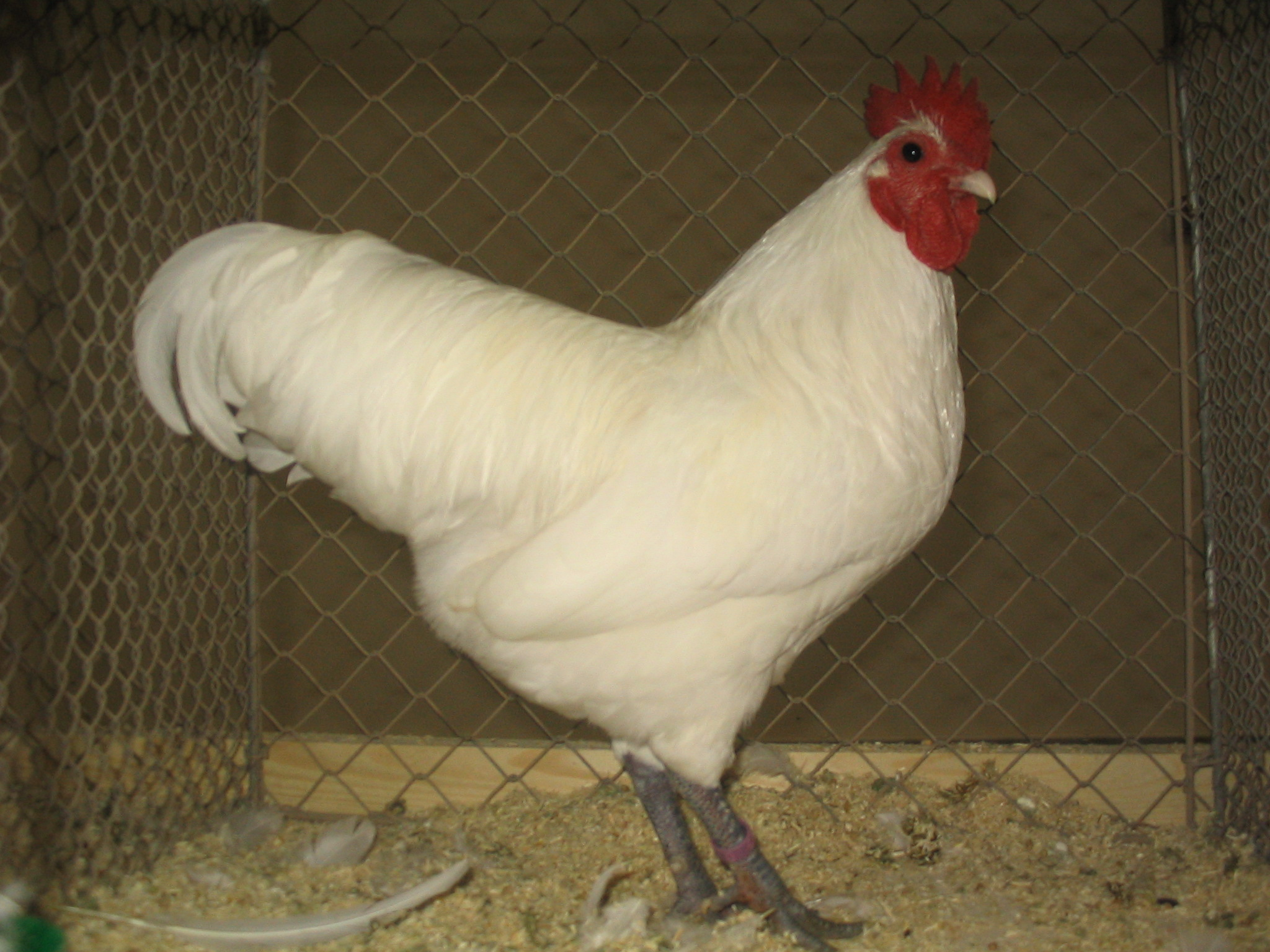
White Australorp bantam rooster.

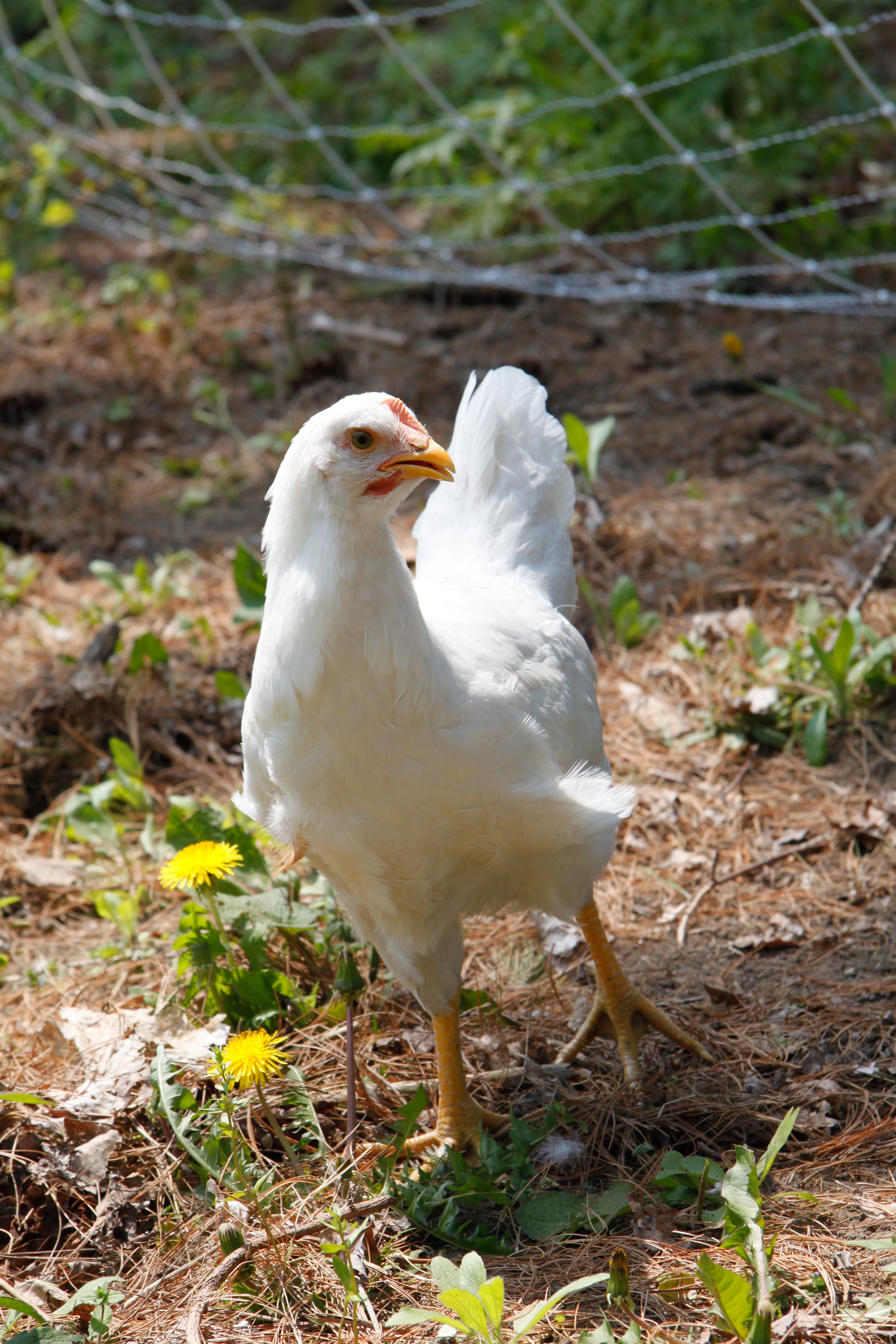
White Plymouth Rock pullet.

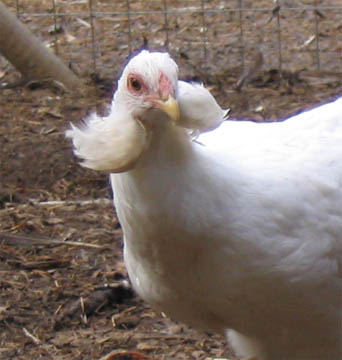
A white Araucana hen

- Ameraucana, white; large fowl and bantam varieties
- Araucana, white
- Asil, white
- Australian Langshan (little-known outside Australia)
- Australorp, white, regular and bantam
- Barnevelder, white, large/bantam (source in German)
- Bearded d'Uccle bantam, white
- Catalana del Prat, Spanish: blanca ('white') ,
- Cornish white, regular and bantam
- Cochin white, regular and frizzle
- Langshan, white
- Cubalaya, white
- Dorking, white, rose-comb
- Faverolles, white, regular and bantam
- Frizzle, white, regular and bantam (the term can also describe the frizzle plumage type as well as this specific breed)
- German Langshan
- Japanese Bantam white
- Jersey Giant white
- Lamona (practically extinct)
- Langshan bantam, white
- Malay bantam, white
- Old English Game, white, regular and bantam
- Orpington, white, regular and bantam
- Plymouth Rock, white; regular, bantam, and dwarf
- Silkie, white, non-bearded or bearded (recessive white); and bantam, white, non-bearded
- Sultan (chicken) white
- Transylvanian Naked-neck, white, regular and bantam
- Wyandotte, white, regular and bantam
- Yokohama, white

== Solid white plumage in other species ==
The occurrence of solid white plumage is widespread among avian species. Such phenotypes result mostly from single mutations associated with absence of melanin deposition.

=== Turkeys (Meleagris gallopavo) ===
Original wild plumage color of turkeys (Meleagris gallopavo) is bronzed, but solid white plumage color due to an autosomal recessive allele (c) in homocygosis is the most frequent phenotype, extended by domestication and imposed by the requirements of meat processing plants.

Hutt and Mueller (1942) found a partial albinism in bronzed turkeys determined by a simple sex-linked gene, which is semi-lethal during incubation period or later. The blindness associated with this albinism limits the individuals to find water and food. Incomplete sex-linked albinism in turkeys in different from that of chickens. The mutation in turkeys eliminates melanin from the retina, causing blindness and resulting lethal to most individuals.

=== Japanese quail (Coturnix japonica) ===
There is solid white feathered variety of Japanese quails (Coturnix japonica) with dark eyes. Solid white feather is due to an autosomal recessive allele (wh) in homocygosis, although some birds may exhibit a few black spots. This mutant color gene produces a white quail with dark eyes when homozygous and two-color pattern known as "tuxedo" when heterozygous. The tuxedo pattern is white on the ventral surface, including the neck and face, while the dorsal surface is an intermingling of black and brown pigment.

There is also another mutation (W) which is autosomal incomplete dominant. Homozygotes for this plumage color mutant have white plumage, whereas heterozygotes for the gene show a diluted plumage color. But quails homozygous for this gene have low viability.

It has also been described an imperfect sex-linked albinism due to the recessive allele al. This pigmentation mutant results in subnormal levels of pigmentation of the eyes and feathers of affected quails. Faint stripes on the backs of the adults is apparently due to structural color only. Perinatal viability is reduced in quails homozygous for this gene.

=== Wild canary (Serinus canaria) ===
There is a semi-albinism in the wild canary (Serinus canaria, Fringillidae) which produces pink eyes at hatch. Eyes darken in the adult phase and the plumage is not solid white but described as cinnamon. This is due to a sex-linked gen and was the first experimental demonstration of sex-linked inheritance in birds after the rediscovery of Mendelian laws.

An autosomal dominant white has been also described in the wild canary which is lethal in homozygosis. All individuals studied happen to be heterozygotes, giving a progeny of white and colored birds in a proportion of 2:1. Homozygotes die in an early phase of embryonic development.

=== Other avian species ===
Kokemüller (1935) described a sex-linked albinism in the budgerigar (Melopsittacus undulatus, Psittacidae). This kind of albinism eliminates melanin and the structural color found in the gene carriers, leaving untouched lipochrome pigments. As a result, budgerigars, which otherwise would be green with a few black spot, become brilliant yellow with pink eyes.

Cook (1939) described an hereditary albinism in the American robin (Turdus migratorius L., Turdidae).

McIlhenny(1940) found a type of albinism in the northern mockingbird (Mimus polyglottos L., Mimidae) which is inherited as a simple autosomal recessive.

== See also ==
- Lavender (chicken plumage)
- Solid black (chicken plumage)
- List of chicken breeds
- List of chicken colours
