= Burmese Bantam =

Burmese breed of bantam chicken

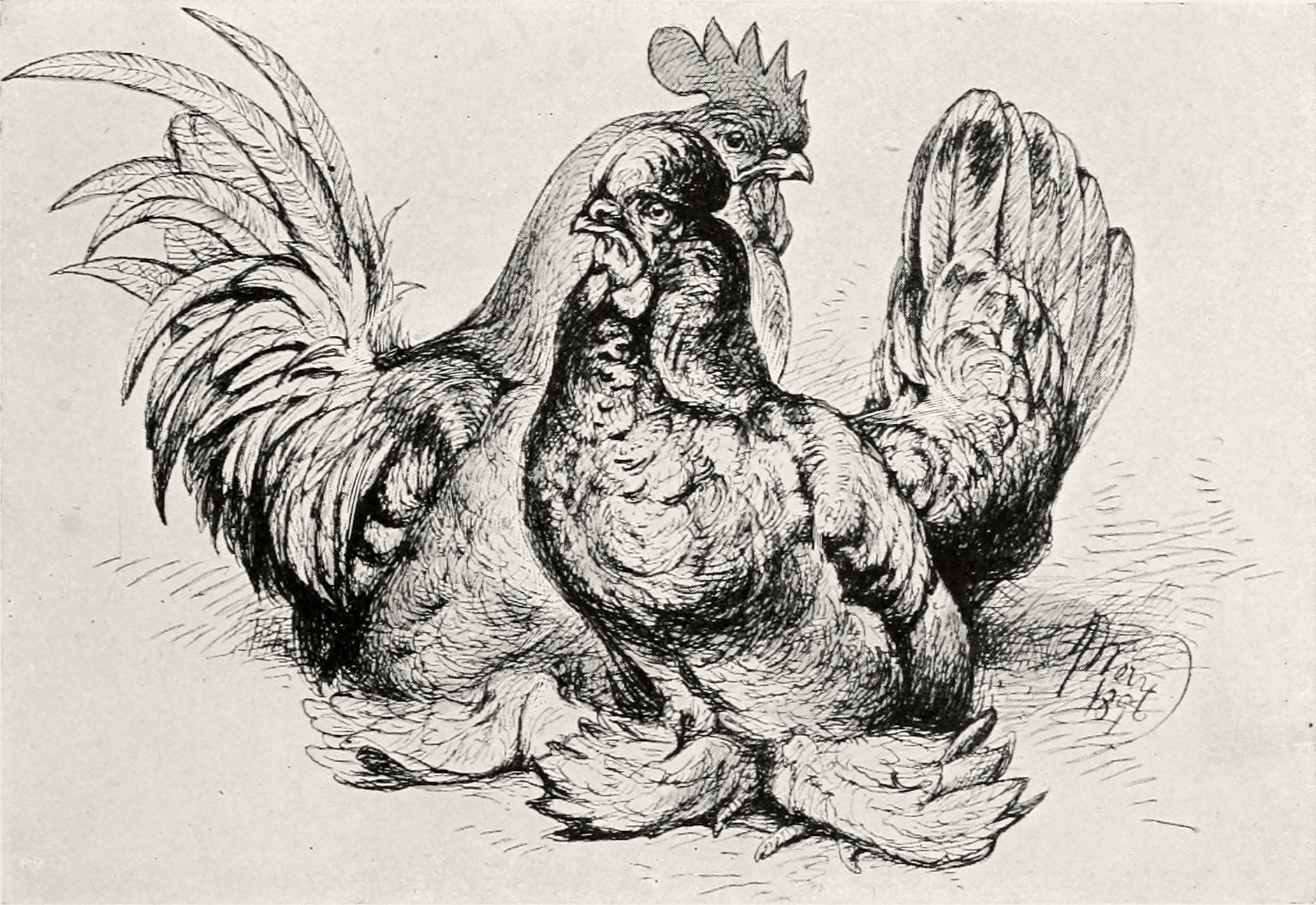
- Illustration by Harrison Weir, 1896
- Conservation status: FAO (2007): critical; DAD-IS (2026): unknown; RBST (2026): priority
- Other names: Burmese
- Country of origin: Myanmar; United Kingdom
- Use: ornamental

Traits
- Weight: Male: 570 g; Female: 450 g
- Egg colour: white
- Comb type: single

Classification
- Chicken; Gallus gallus domesticus

The Burmese Bantam or Burmese is a British breed of bantam chicken. It apparently originated in Myanmar, formerly Burma, in the latter part of the nineteenth century. By the time of the First World War it was thought to be extinct. Some surviving individuals were discovered in the 1970s and were bred with white Booted Bantams to recreate the breed. It is a true bantam – there is no corresponding large fowl.

== History ==
The Burmese Bantam is documented at least as far back as 1847, when it received a passing mention from Edward Blyth, the curator of the museum of the Asiatic Society of Calcutta (now Kolkata). Charles Darwin uses it as an example of a creeper chicken in his Variation of Animals and Plants Under Domestication of 1868, and also compares its bones to those of other chickens and jungle fowl; he collected a specimen, now in the Natural History Museum of London. According to the Poultry Club of Great Britain the Burmese derives from birds sent to the United Kingdom from Burma in the 1880s by an officer in the British Army. William Flamank Entwisle received one of these birds, apparently a carrier of the creeper gene, and bred from it. By the beginning of the First World War the breed was believed to be extinct.

In 1970 some were given to Andrew Sheppy, who had established the Rare Poultry Society. He bred them with white Booted Bantams and successfully re-established the breed. An attempt has been made in Holland to re-create the Burmese by cross-breeding other bantams, but the results do not closely resemble the birds shown in historic drawings by Harrison Weir and J.W. Ludlow of the original stock.

== Characteristics ==
The Burmese is a true bantam – there is no corresponding large fowl. It resembles the Booted Bantam, but is smaller and lower to the ground; it has a small crest. The legs are short, with heavy feathering. The comb is single, the earlobes are small and the wattles drooping and fairly long. Only one colour is recognised by the Poultry Club of Great Britain: the white. The Dutch re-creation is black.
