= Barbu de Grubbe =

Breed of chicken

- Conservation status: FAO (2007): no data; Moula (2012): in danger; DAD-IS (2023): unknown
- Other names: Dutch: Grubbe baardkriel
- Country of origin: Belgium

Traits
- Weight: Male: 700 g; Female: 600 g
- Comb type: rose comb

Classification
- PCGB: true bantam
- Chicken; Gallus gallus domesticus

The Barbu de Grubbe, Dutch: Grubbe baardkriel, is a Belgian breed of bantam chicken. It is a true bantam, and has no full-sized counterpart; males weigh about 700 grams and hens about 600 g. It is a tail-less variant of the Barbu d'Anvers, and is otherwise similar to it in every respect. The same colour varieties are accepted for the Barbu de Grubbe as for the Barbu d'Anvers.

== History ==
In about 1904 a tail-less Barbu d'Anvers was born to the breeder Robert Pauwels, creator of the Barbu d'Everberg breed, at his breeding farm in the municipality of Kortenberg, between Brussels and Louvain. By careful cross-breeding he created a good number of such tail-less birds, which were seen at many exhibitions up to the time of the First World War. The name Barbu de Grubbe was given to the breed. After the War they were not again seen for several decades.

In 2012 a total of 170 breeding Barbu de Grubbe birds were counted in Belgium. The breed is rare, and is considered to be 'in danger'; the conservation status of many other Belgian bantam breeds is classed as 'critical'. The Barbu de Grubbe is regularly seen at poultry exhibitions in the Netherlands, and has since 2008 been recognised in Germany. In the United Kingdom it is classed among the true bantams.

== Characteristics ==
The Barbu de Grubbe is identical in all respects to the Barbu d'Anvers, except that the tail and coccygeal bone are absent.

== Use ==
The Barbu de Grubbe is an ornamental breed, kept mainly for fancy. Hens lay small creamy-white eggs weighing about 35 g.
