= Black Shumen =

Bulgarian breed of chicken

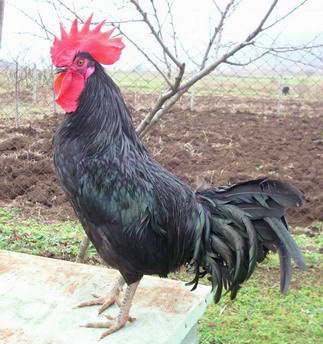
- Cock

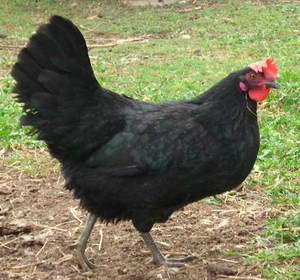
- Hen
- Conservation status: FAO (2007): not listed; DAD-IS (2026): endangered-maintained
- Other names: Bulgarian: Черна шуменска кокошка; Cherna shumenska kokoshka; Black shoumenska hen
- Country of origin: Bulgaria
- Distribution: Stara Zagora Province
- Use: eggs

Traits
- Weight: Male: 2–2.5 kg; Female: 1.5–1.8 kg
- Skin colour: white
- Egg colour: greyish white
- Comb type: single

Classification
- Chicken; Gallus gallus domesticus

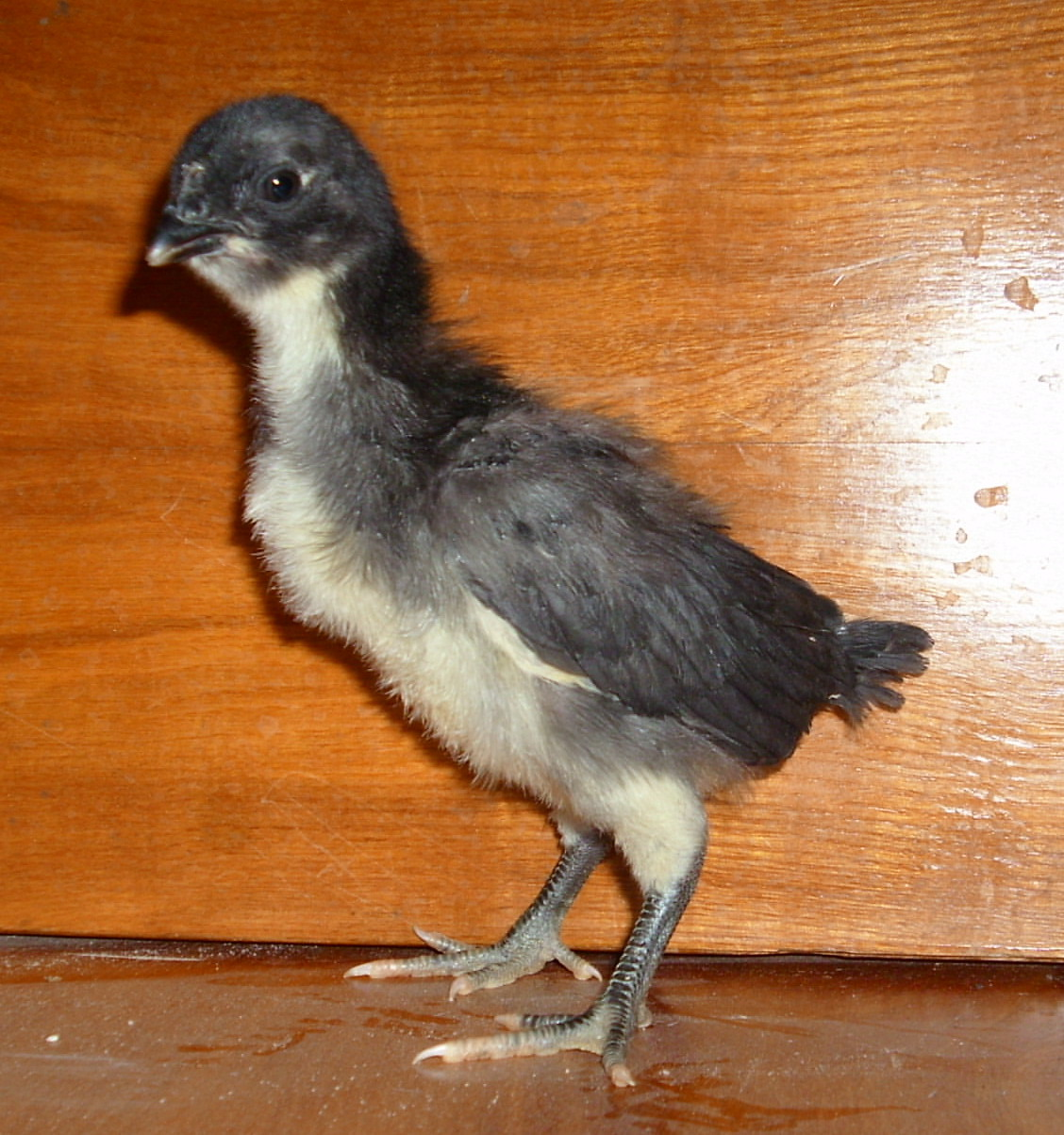
Chick

The Black Shumen is a Bulgarian breed of chicken. It originates in Shumen Province, in north-eastern Bulgaria. In the mid-twentieth century it was cross-bred with Minorca chickens and later, briefly, with Rhode Island Red birds.

In the twenty-first century it is an endangered breed; one flock of about 200 birds is maintained at the Agricultural Institute of Stara Zagora.

== History ==
Black chickens showing some Mediterranean characteristics – a large comb, falling to one side in hens; high production of white eggs; early maturation – were traditionally reared in Shumen Province, in north-eastern Bulgaria, and in the valley of the Kamchiya River, which flows eastward to the Black Sea. Between 1951 and 1989, birds of this type were selectively bred at the Agricultural Institute of Stara Zagora (Zemedelski Institut Stara Zagora) at Malko Kadievo, near the city of Stara Zagora. After an initial phase of cross-breeding with black Minorca cocks, the Black Shumen was recognised as a breed. in the 1960s and 1970s an attempt was made to increase the size of the birds by cross-breeding with Rhode Island Red stock; this did not last long.

In the latter twentieth century the Black Shumen was widely distributed, in farms, schools, agricultural colleges and research institutes. With the changes that followed the Fall of the Iron Curtain in 1989, breed numbers dropped sharply. In the twenty-first century there is only one flock of the birds, that at the Agricultural Institute of Stara Zagora. In 2026 this numbered 200 birds, 180 hens and 20 cocks; the conservation status of the breed was reported as "at risk/endangered-maintained".

== Characteristics ==
The Black Shumen is black with green lights; the shanks and feet are slate-grey, the skin is white (unpigmented) and the beak is black. The comb is large, with five to seven points; the earlobes are elongated and the wattles are large. Comb, wattles and earlobes are all bright red; in hens the comb droops to one side or the other.

It is a light breed: weights are variously given as 1.3–1.6 kg for hens and 1.8–1.9 kg for cocks, or as 1.5–1.8 kg for hens and 2.0–2.5 kg respectively.

== Use ==
It is early-maturing; on average, hens start laying at 145 or at 173 days old. Egg production is variously reported as either 150–155 or 160–170 greyish-white eggs per year, weighing either 45–47 g or 53–55 g. (Note: about 1.6 or 2 oz respectively)
