= Booted Bantam =

European breed of bantam chicken

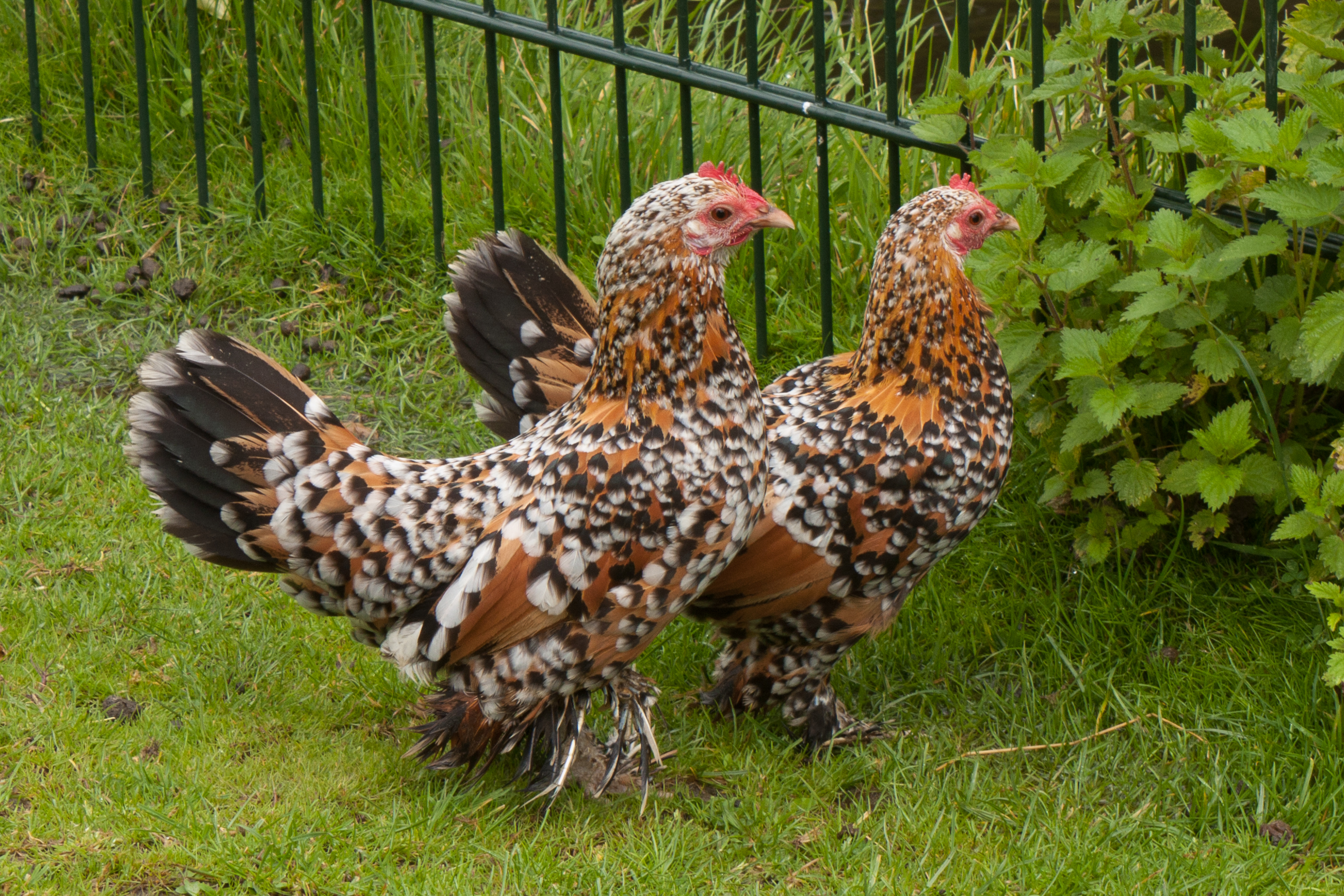
- Milefleur Booted Bantam hens in The Hague, Netherlands

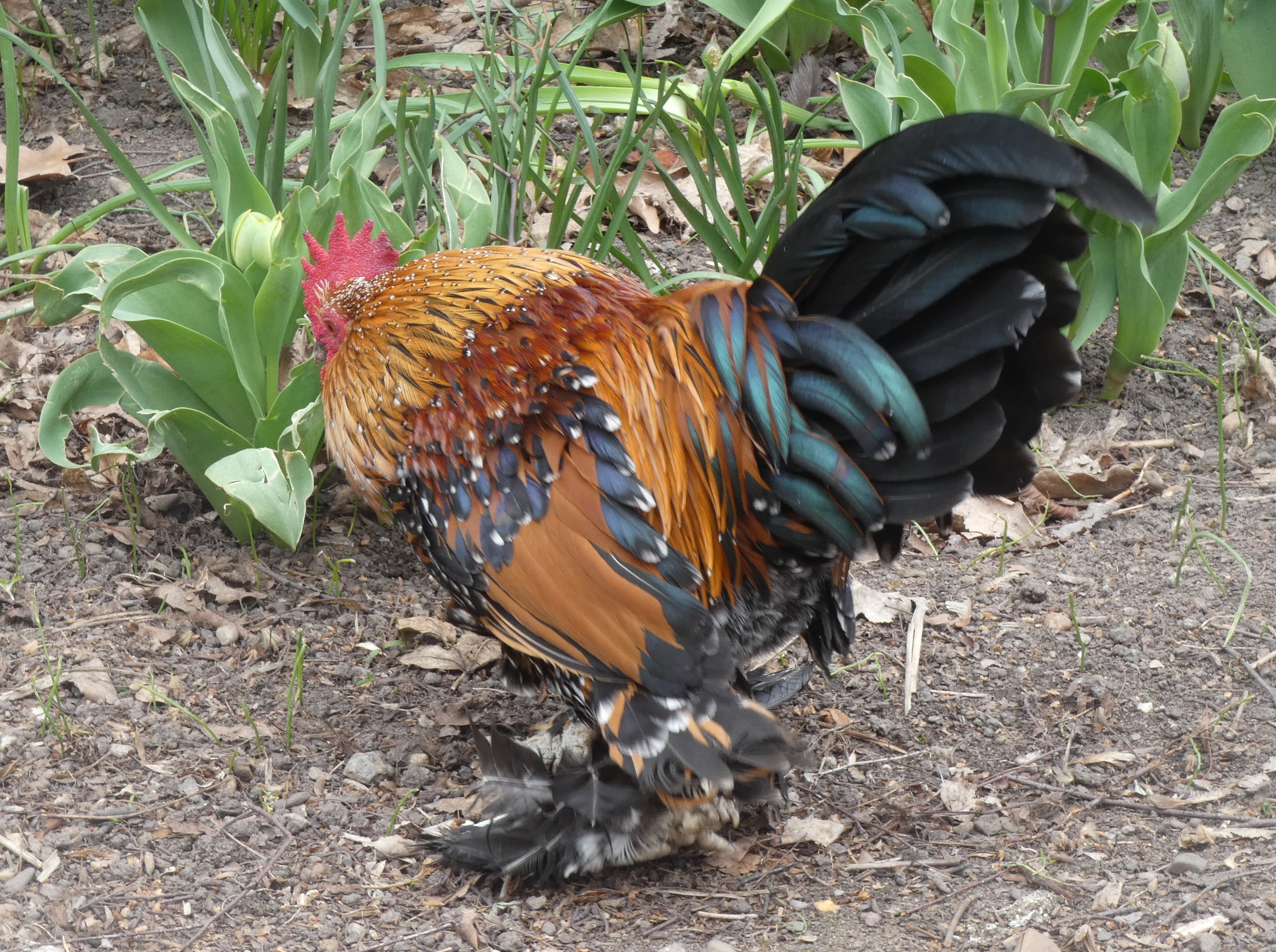
- Cock bird in Dieskau, Saalekreis
- Other names: Dutch Booted Bantam; Sabelpoot; Dutch: Nederlandse sabelpootkriel; German: Federfüßige Zwerghühner
- Country of origin: Netherlands; Belgium; Germany; United Kingdom
- Use: show

Traits
- Weight: Male: maximum 850 g; Female: maximum 650 g
- Egg colour: white or tinted

Classification
- APA: feather legged
- EE: yes
- PCGB: rare true bantam
- Chicken; Gallus gallus domesticus

The Booted Bantam or Dutch Booted Bantam is a European breed of true bantam chicken. It is characterised by abundant feathering on the feet and shanks, which gives it a "booted" appearance; and by vulture hocks, long stiff downward-pointing feathers on the backs of the thighs, from which the Dutch name Sabelpoot ('sabre-legged') derives.

== History ==
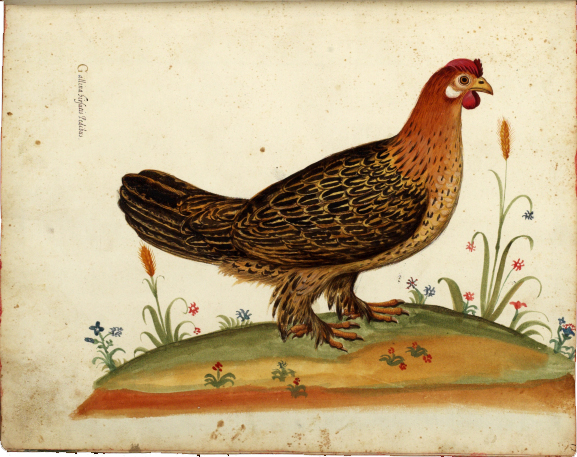
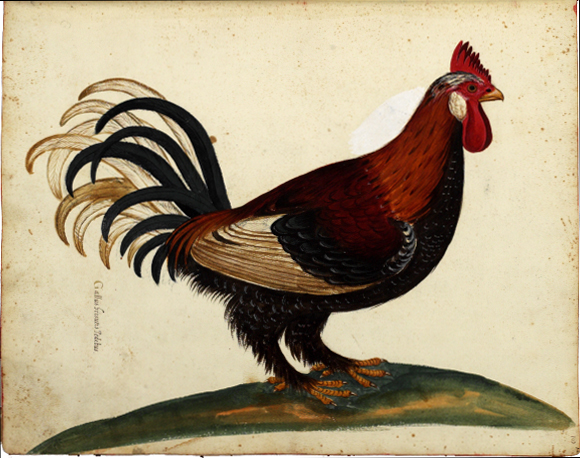
Ulisse Aldrovandi, illustrations of small feather-footed hen and cock, for the Ornithologiae tomus alter of 1600
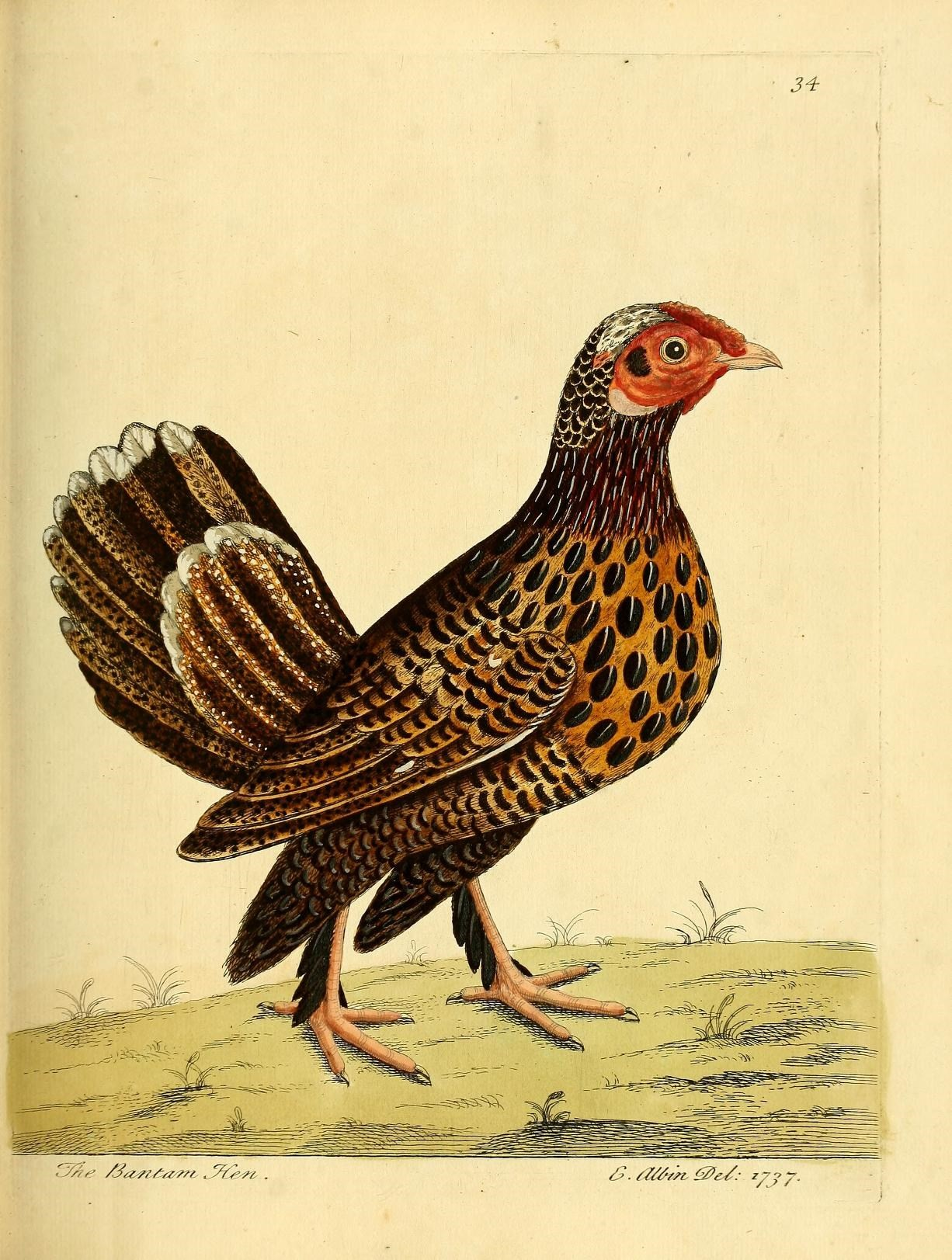
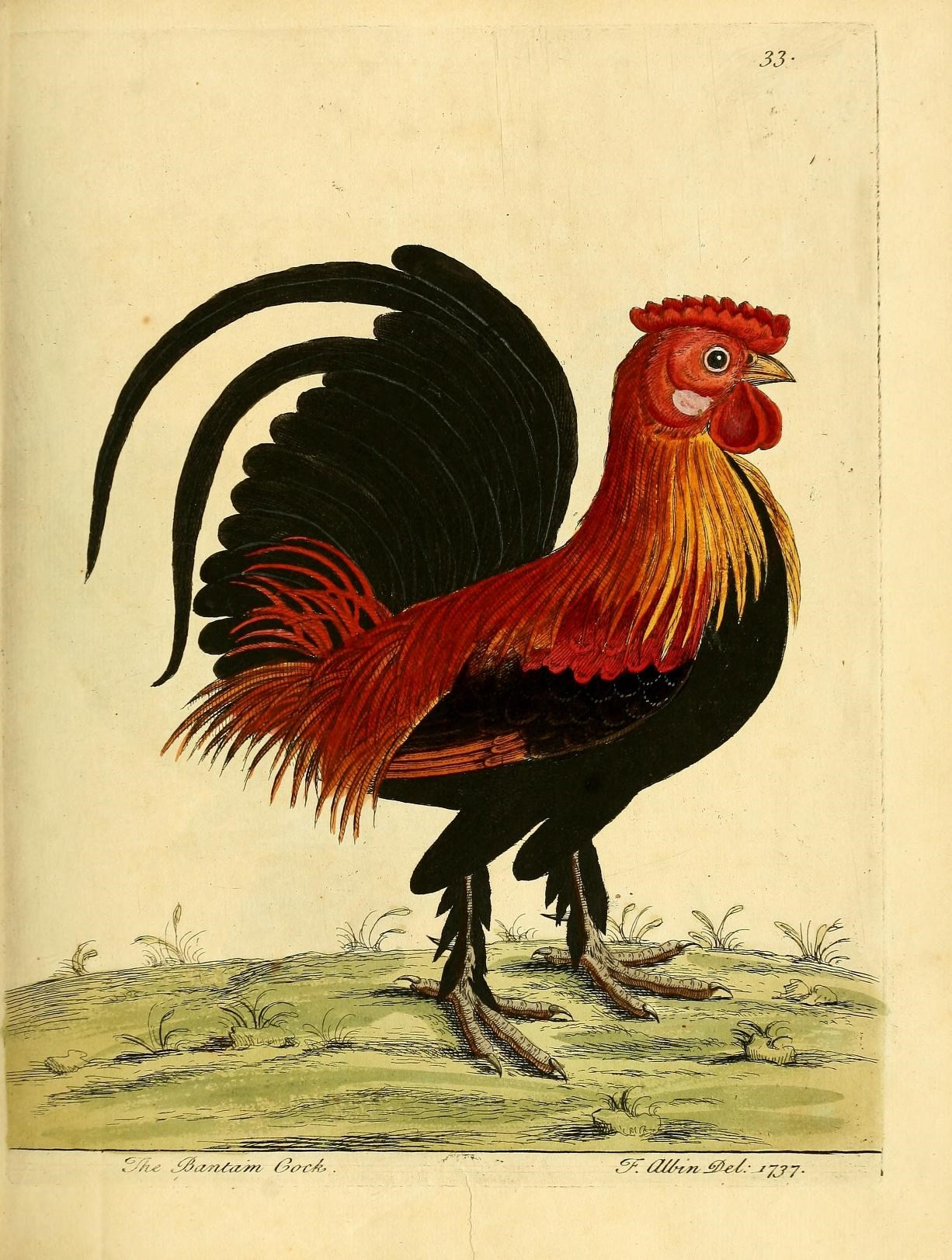
Eleazar Albin, illustrations of bantam hen and cock, from A Natural History of Birds (1738), showing feathering and vulture hocks

The history of the Booted Bantam is complicated, aspects of it involving Belgian bantams, the German Federfüßige Zwerghühner, the Dutch Sabelpoot and bantams in the United Kingdom. Feather-footed bantams have been present in Europe for hundreds of years; birds of this type are pictured in the works of Ulisse Aldrovandi and Aelbert Cuyp in the seventeenth century, and of Eleazar Albin in the eighteenth. Albin's description of 1738 says of the bantam cock "... from the Thighs grew long stiff Feathers reaching beyond his Knees two Inches, which they call Boots; his Legs were also feathered down to his Toes ...", while of the hen he says "... she was booted and feathered down to her Toes, as all the true Bantam kind are"; he is clear that these birds were originally brought from "Bantam in India".

These birds were not included in the first British poultry standard, the Standard of Excellence in Exhibition Poultry of William Tegetmeier of 1865, but were described in detail in his The Poultry Book of 1867; he mentions that a pure white colour variety had recently been shown. Both the white and the black variety are thought to have been bred in the United Kingdom; the black variant is documented at least from 1841, when William Flamank Entwisle received a pair as a gift.

The birds were present in the United States by 1836, when they were being bred in Massachusetts. The white colour variant was included in the American Standard of Excellence in 1876, and was added to the American Standard of Perfection in 1879.

In the United Kingdom, a breed society – the Booted Bantam Society UK – was formed in 2014.

== Characteristics ==
The Booted Bantam has a short compact body, short in the back and with the breast carried well forward; the upper line of the neck, back and tail has a pronounced U-shape. The legs have well-developed vulture hocks, long stiff feathers pointing down from the backs of the thighs and almost reaching the ground; the shanks and feet are heavily feathered, particularly on the outer side. There are four toes. The wings are long and large, and point downwards at about the same angle as the vulture hocks. The comb is single and upright, with five to seven points; the earlobes and wattles are red. The colour of the beak varies according to the plumage.

The Entente Européenne lists thirty-three colour variants, of which twenty-six are recognised at European level. Eleven colours were listed by the Poultry Club of Great Britain in the sixth (2008) edition of the British Poultry Standards: black, black mottled, blue, buff mottled, cuckoo, gold millefleur, lavender, lemon millefleur, millefleur, porcelain, silver millefleur and white. The number was increased to fourteen in the seventh (2018) edition of the standards. The American Poultry Association list five variants: black, millefleur, porcelain, self-blue and white.

== Use ==
The Booted Bantam is kept for show. Hens may lay about 120 eggs per year, with an average weight of some 30 g; the colour varies from tinted to white.

The bearded and feather-footed Barbu d'Uccle was created in the early years of the twentieth century by cross-breeding birds of this breed with Barbu d'Anvers stock.
