= Dutch Bantam =

Dutch breed of bantam chicken

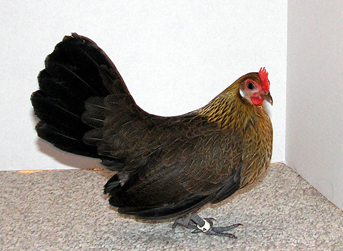
- Dutch Bantam pullet
- Conservation status: FAO (2007): endangered
- Other names: Dutch: Hollandse Kriel
- Country of origin: the Netherlands
- Standard: HKC (in Dutch); PCGB

Traits
- Weight: Male: 500–550 grams; Female: 400–450 grams
- Skin color: white
- Egg color: white
- Comb type: single with 5 points

Classification
- ABA: single comb clean legged
- EE: yes
- PCGB: true bantam
- Chicken; Gallus gallus domesticus

The Dutch Bantam (Dutch: Hollandse Kriel) is a breed of bantam chicken originating in the Netherlands. It is a true bantam, a naturally small bird with no related large fowl from which it was miniaturized. It is kept mainly for exhibition, and has been bred in many color varieties; it is a good layer of small eggs.

== History ==
Diminutive chickens of similar coloration to today's Dutch Bantams have been seen in the Netherlands for hundreds of years, but the exact origin of the breed is unclear. It is likely that the ancestors of the Dutch Bantam were Southeast Asian bantams brought back by sailors from the Dutch East Indies. Historically, it is supposed that these tiny chickens were selectively bred because only small eggs could be kept by peasant farmers, while larger ones were required to be sent to the kitchens of the landed gentry. The first written reference to the Dutch Bantam as a distinct breed is in the Hand- en standaardboek of R.T. Maitland, director of the Royal Zoological Botanical Gardens of The Hague, published in 1882; he referred to them as patrijskrielen, "partridge bantams". The Nederlandse Hoender Club, the Dutch national poultry club, recognized the breed in 1906. A breeders' association, the Hollandse Krielenfokkers Club, was formed in 1946.

The Dutch Bantam was first exported to the United States in the 1950s. It was included in the Standard of Perfection of the American Poultry Association in 1992 in two colors; four others were later added. It reached the United Kingdom towards the end of the 1960s; the British Dutch Bantam Club was formed in 1982, and thirteen colors are standardized. It is also reared in Germany and in South Africa.

== Characteristics ==
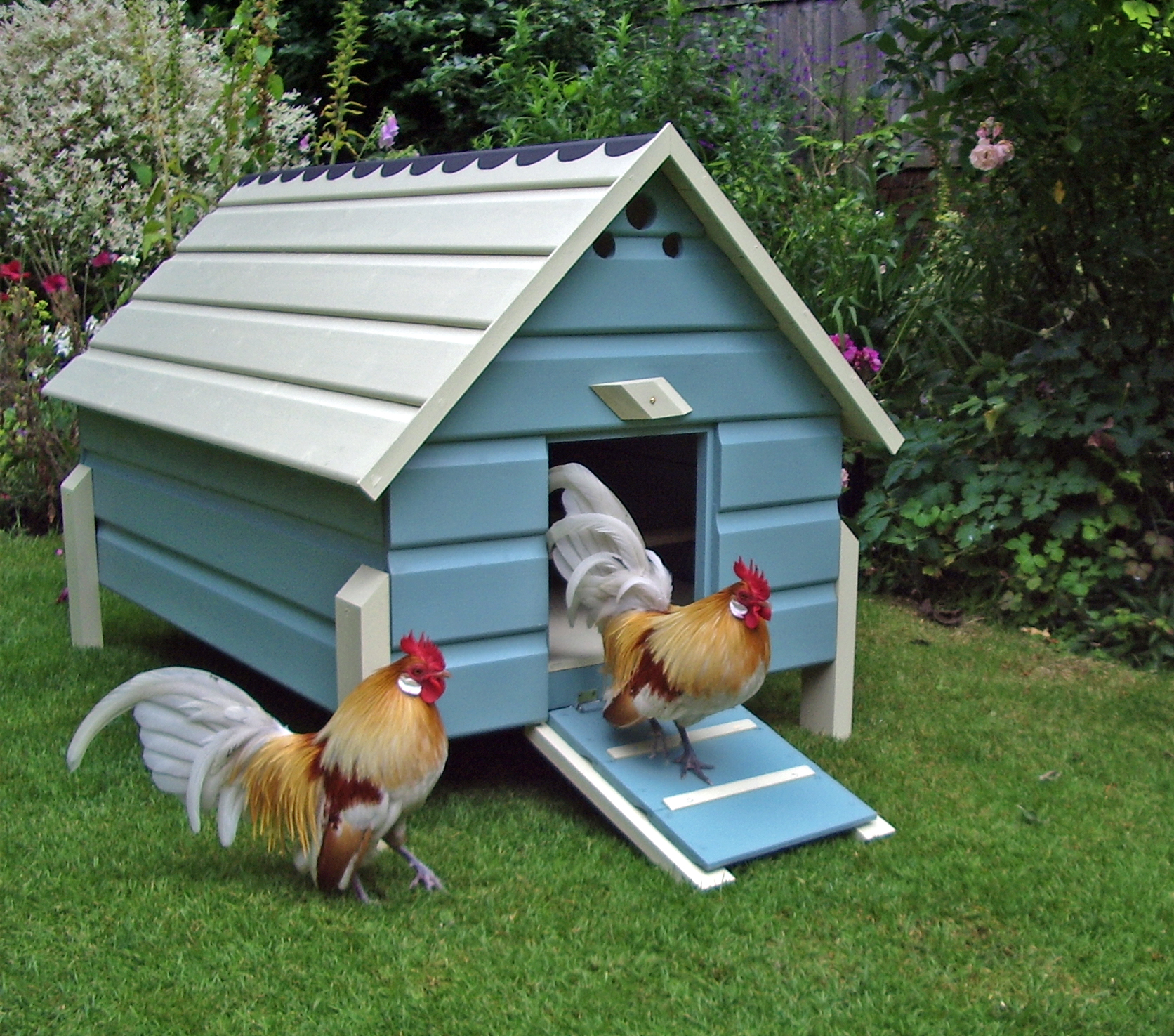
Dutch Bantams

Dutch Bantams are among the smallest breeds of true bantam. Cock birds should weigh no more than 550 grams, and hens 450 grams. Due to their light weight and relatively large wings, Dutch Bantams fly rather well. The original type of plumage for Dutch Bantams was a partridge pattern. Twenty-nine colour varieties are recognised by the Dutch association. All varieties should have a comb with 5 points, white earlobes, slate blue legs, apart from certain varieties and white skin.

The breed is friendly in temperament, but somewhat flighty. Their small size and comb type makes them not especially cold hardy. Dutch Bantam hens make good mothers and will easily go broody. Uniquely for bantams, and especially ones popular in showing, Dutch Bantams lay well; they can produce 160 cream or white eggs in a year, though the size of the egg is much smaller than commercial layers. Due to their friendly character and egg laying ability, the breed is well suited to hobbyists and backyard keepers needing a bantam-sized bird.

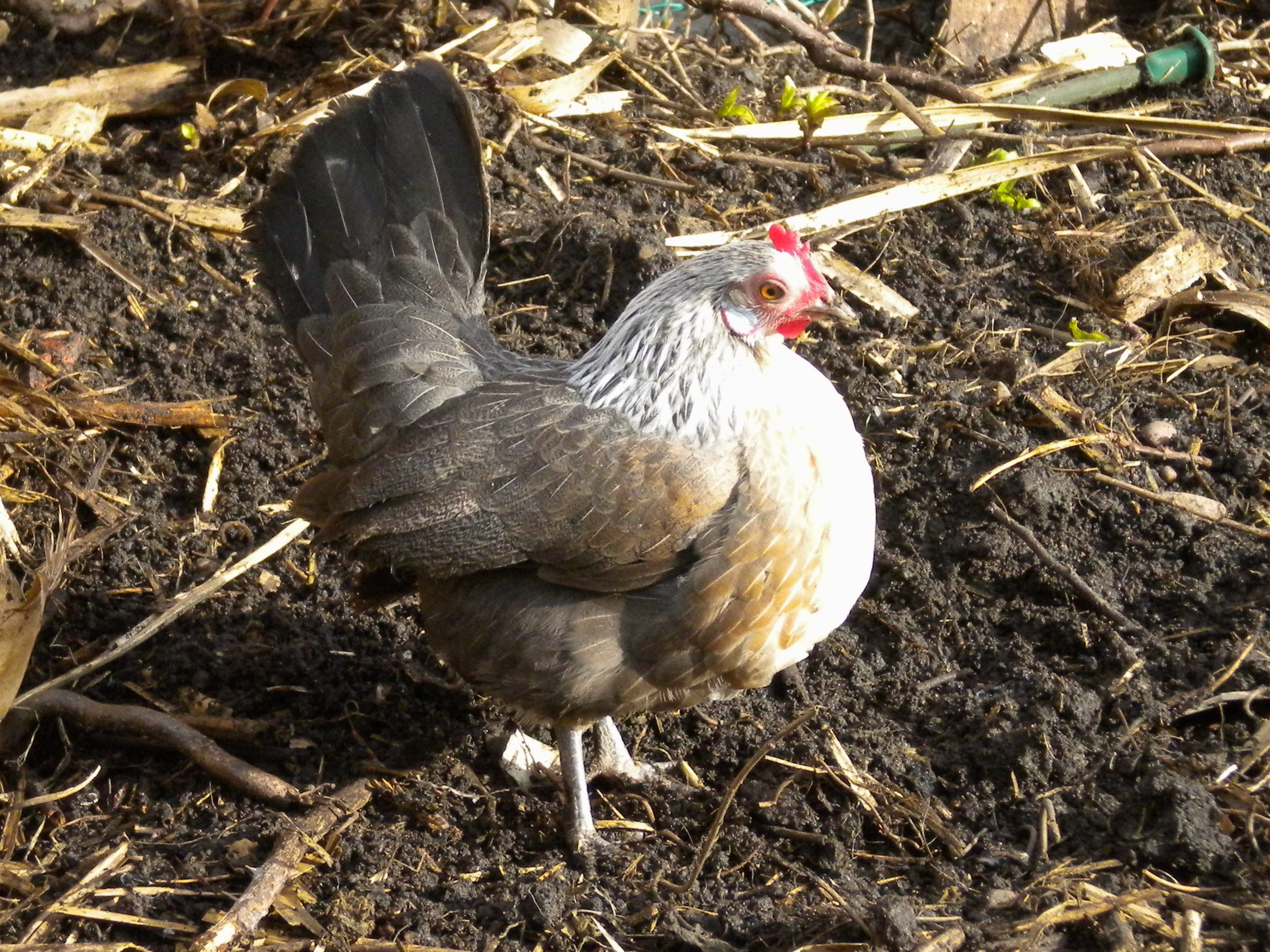
A silver duckwing hen

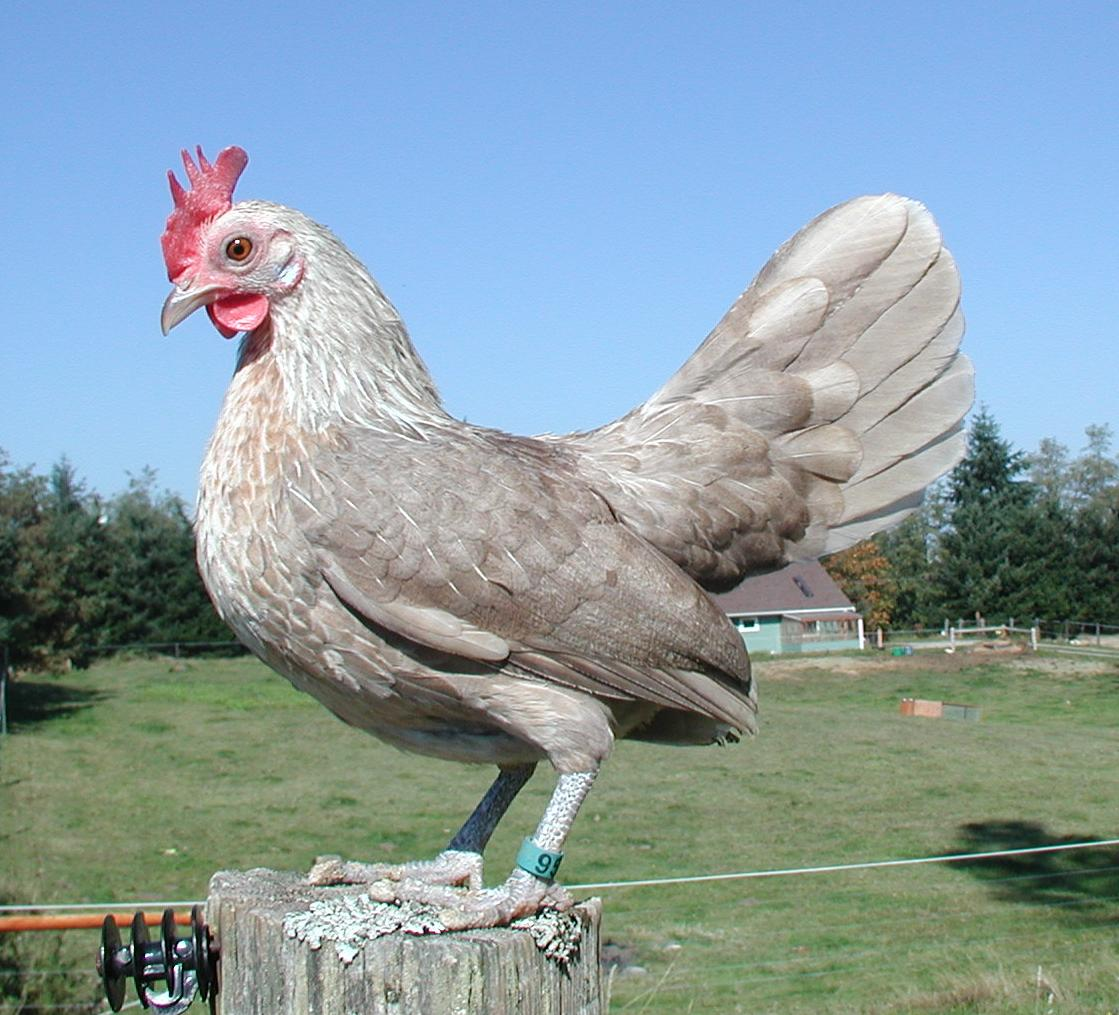
A fawn silver hen

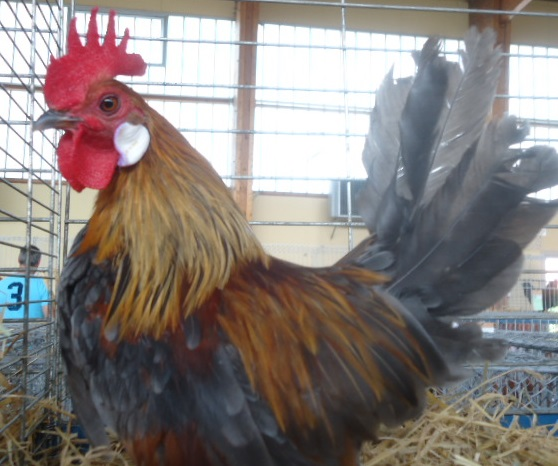
Blue-breasted red cock
