= Barbu d'Uccle =

Belgian breed of bantam chicken

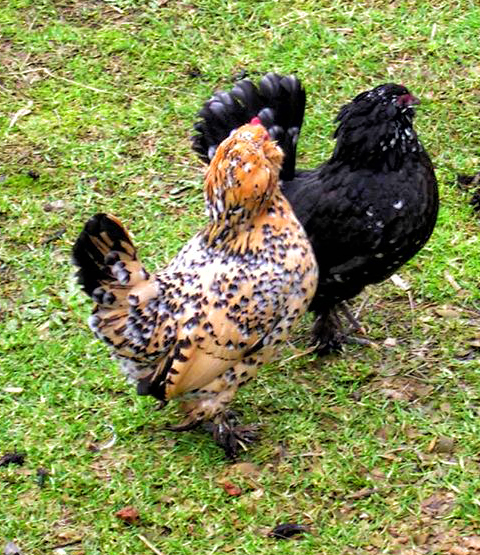
- A millefleur and a black mottled Barbu d'Uccle
- Conservation status: FAO (2007): no data; DAD-IS (2020): critical
- Other names: Dutch: Ukkelse Baardkriel; Bearded d'Uccle
- Country of origin: Belgium
- Standard: Bantam Club Français

Traits
- Weight: Male: 750 grams; Female: 650 grams

Classification
- APA: feather legged
- EE: yes
- PCGB: Belgian bantam
- Chicken; Gallus gallus domesticus

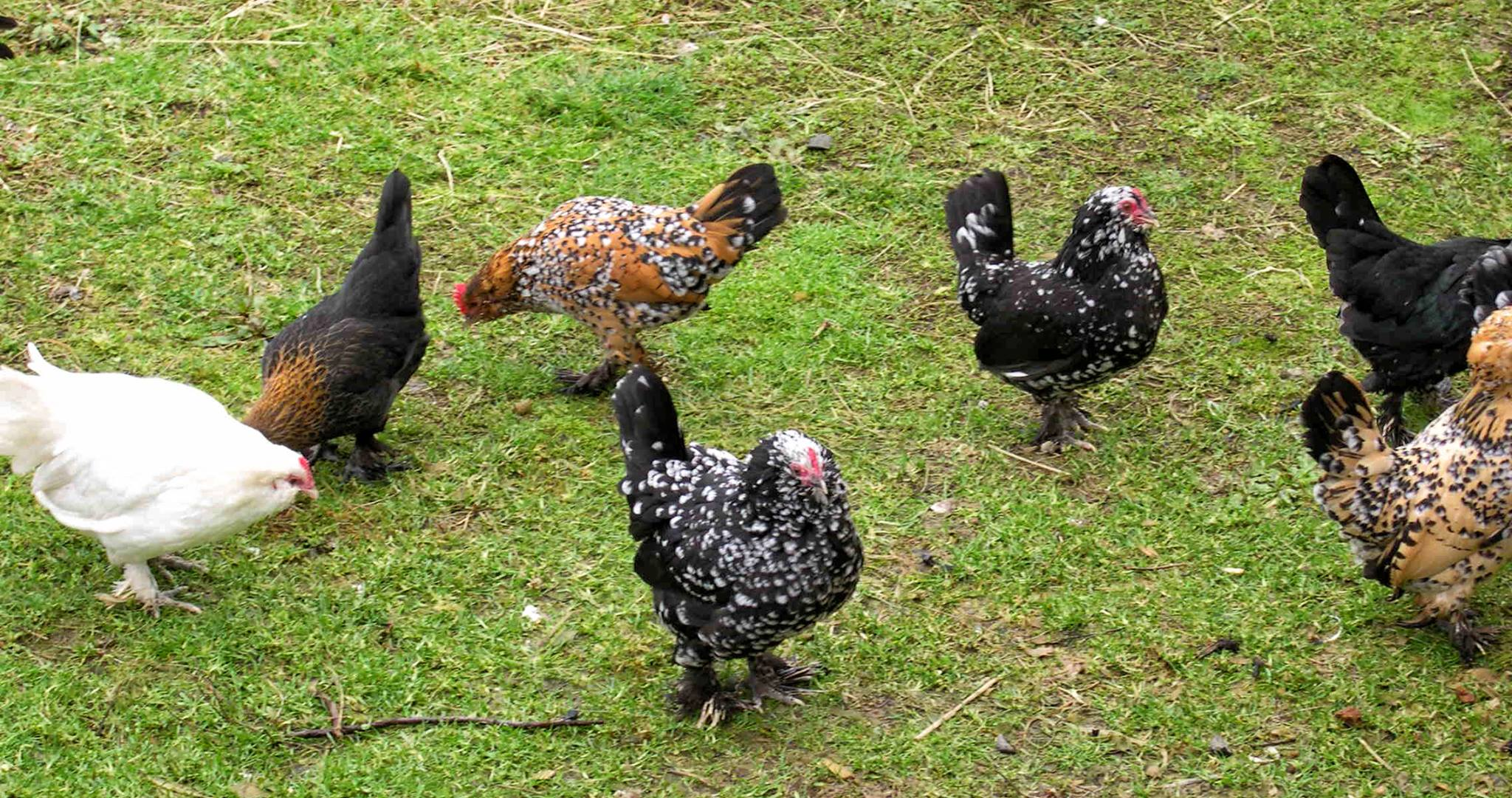
Millefleur, black mottled and white varieties

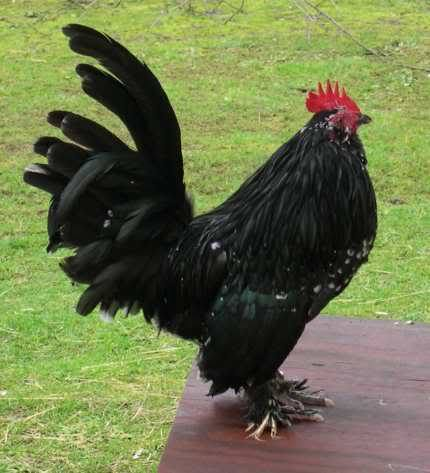
A black mottled cock

The Barbu d'Uccle or Belgian d'Uccle, Dutch: Ukkelse Baardkriel, it is a Belgian breed of bearded bantam chicken. It was first bred in the town of Uccle on the outskirts of Brussels, in central Belgium, in the early years of the twentieth century. It is a true bantam, with no standard-sized large fowl counterpart, and is one of eleven Belgian true bantam breeds.

== History ==
The Barbu d'Uccle was created by Michael Van Gelder of Uccle, Belgium, in the early years of the twentieth century, with help and advice from Robert Pauwels and Louis Vander Snickt. It is thought, but not known for certain, that he cross-bred the existing Sabelpoot and Barbu d'Anvers bantam breeds. The Barbu d'Uccle was first shown in 1905. The first colours were millefleurs and porcelain, but black, white and cuckoo were soon added; by 1909 the breed was well established. The Barbu d'Uccle was first exported to the United Kingdom in 1911. The millefleur variety was added to the Standard of Perfection of the American Poultry Association in 1914. From that time, partly as a consequence of the First and Second World Wars, it gradually declined. A breed society, the Club belge du Barbu d’Uccle, was formed in 1969.

In the twenty-first century conservation status of the breed is listed as "critical"; it is nevertheless the third-most numerous true bantam breed in Belgium.

== Characteristics ==
The Barbu d'Uccle has a low posture, a full beard and a muff; the legs are heavily feathered. It has a single comb, unlike the Barbu d'Anvers, which has a rose comb.

In the Netherlands the recommended weight is 700–800 g for cock birds, and about 550 g for hens, while the French standard recommends average weights of 750 g and 650 g respectively. The Poultry Club of Great Britain suggests a weight in the range 790–910 g for males and 680–790 g for females. The American standard specifies an ideal weight of 26 oz (740 g) for cocks, 22 oz (620 g) for hens and cockerels, and 20 oz (570 g) for pullets.

Twenty-eight colour varieties are listed for the Barbu d'Uccle in Belgium. Colours listed by the Entente Européenne include blue, blue quail, cuckoo, millefleur, porcelain, lavender, lavender quail, black, black mottled, silver quail, quail, and white. The American Poultry Association lists seven varieties: black (1996), golden neck (1996), millefleur (1914), mottled (1996), porcelain (1965), self blue (1996), and white (1981).
