= List of chicken colours =

Breeders and fanciers of chickens accurately describe the colours and patterns of the feathers of chicken breeds and varieties. This is a list of the terms used in this context.

== Self ==
Self-coloured chickens are those which display one solid colour without patterning of any kind.

Colour	Cock	Hen	Notes
Black			Green iridescence is desired for "beetle black" show chickens.
Blue	Sumatra	dark blue-laced Andalusian	
Splash or Blue Splashed White	Sumatra	Silkie	Splash is the homozygous form of Blue
Buff			
Lavender		Red lavender	
Red			Red is the intensified version of Buff
White		Silkie	

== Barred and cuckoo ==
Colour	Cock	Hen	Notes
Barred		Barred Rock Hen	Divided into Dark and Light in Australian Plymouth Rocks
Crele			The cuckoo pattern with black-breasted red pigmentation
Silver Cuckoo			
Golden Cuckoo			

== Columbian, belted ==
Colour	Cock	Hen	Notes
White Columbian		Sundheimer	Called 'light' in the Brahma and Sussex
Buff Columbian			
Golden Belted			Belted resembles Columbian but the head and neck are solid black, not merely striped
Silver Belted			

== Duckwing ==
Colour	Cock	Hen	Notes
Golden Duckwing			
Blue Golden Duckwing			
Silver Duckwing			
Blue Silver Duckwing			
Fawn Silver Duckwing			

== Laced ==
Colour	Cock	Hen	Notes
Black Laced			not used; black-laced plumage is named after the red series colour instead: "golden laced" for black and red, "citron laced" for black and buff, "silver laced" for black and white
Blue Laced			
Blue Laced Red			
Buff Laced			also known as Chamois
Golden Laced	Sebright		
Silver Laced			

== Pencilled ==
Colour	Cock	Hen	Notes
Birchen			Sometimes called Grey in Japanese bantams.
Golden Pencilled			
Silver Pencilled			
Yellow Pencilled			Sometimes called Chamois Pencilled in Friesian chickens.

== Mottled, spangled, mille fleur ==
Colour	Cock	Hen	Notes
Black Mottled		(chicks other color)	
Blue Mottled			
other mottled	red	lavender	
Citron Spangled			
Golden Spangled			
Silver Spangled			
Mille Fleur	mahogany Orpington couple	Sussex chick	Called 'speckled' in the Sussex, 'jubilee' in the Orpington.
Lemon Mille Fleur			
Porcelain	lavender porcelain	lavender porcelain	A diluted version of Mille Fleur

== Black-tailed ==
Colour	Cock	Hen	Notes
Black-tailed Buff			
Black-tailed White			
Black-tailed red			

== Black-breasted ==
Colour	Cock	Hen	Notes
Black Breasted Red			
Blue Breasted Red			
Partridge			
Wheaten			
Blue Wheaten			

== Others ==
Colour	Cock	Hen	Notes
Brassy Back			
Blue Brassy Back			
Blue Light Brown			
Blue-red			
Brown			
Brown Red			Sometimes called Gold Birchen.
Coloured			
Coronation			
Cream Light Brown			
Dark brown			
Exchequer			only in the Leghorn
Ginger Red			
Golden Neck			
Golden-necked mille fleur			
Gray			
Lemon Blue			
Light Brown			
Pyle			Alternatively spelt Pile.
Red Pyle			
Quail			
Salmon			
Silver Blue			
Silver Gray			
Splash			
Tolbunt			Seen only in Polish chickens
White Laced Red			
Chocolate			Rare; bred in Orpington bantams in the 1990s
