= Barbu d'Everberg =

Belgian breed of chicken

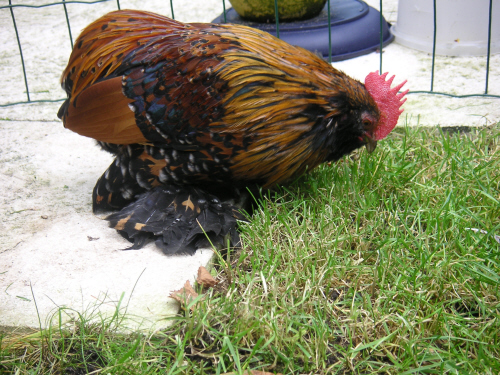
- A cock bird
- Conservation status: FAO (2007): no data; Moula (2010): critical; DAD-IS (2025): unknown
- Other names: Dutch: Everbergse Baardkriel; Rumpless d’Uccle
- Country of origin: Belgium

Traits
- Weight: Male: 700–800 g; Female: 550–650 g

Classification
- PCGB: true bantam
- Chicken; Gallus gallus domesticus

The Barbu d'Everberg, Dutch: Everbergse Baardkriel, is a Belgian breed of bantam chicken. It is a tailless variant of the Barbu d'Uccle, and was bred in about 1906 at the Château d'Everberg, at Everberg in the municipality of Kortenberg, between Brussels and Leuven (Louvain). It is among the most endangered chicken breeds in Belgium, and in 2010 its conservation status was classed as "critical". It is a true bantam, with no large counterpart. Cocks weigh 700–800 g, and hens 550–650 g.

The Barbu d'Everberg is listed as a breed by the Entente Européenne. In Britain and in the Netherlands it is considered a variant of the Barbu d'Uccle rather than a separate breed.
