= Barbu d'Anvers =

Breed of chicken

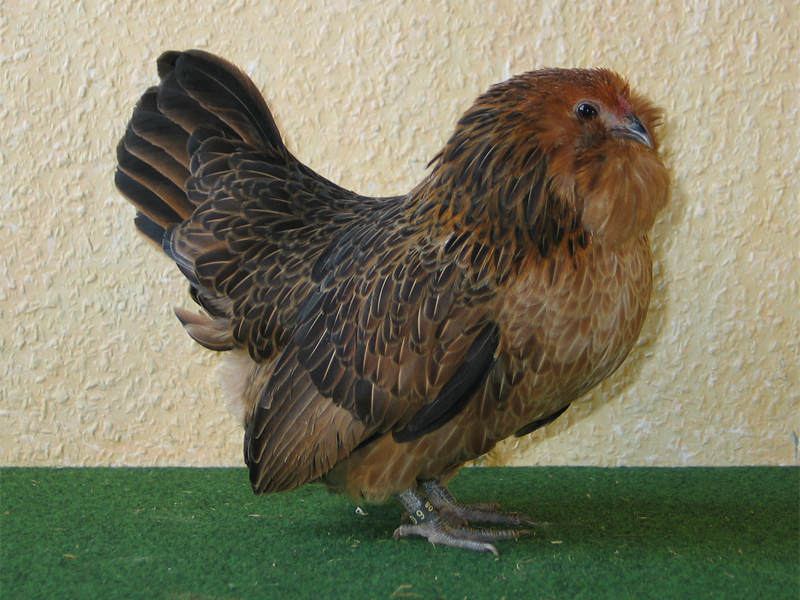
- Hen bird
- Other names: Dutch: Antwerpse baardkriel; Bearded d'Anvers Bantam; Belgian Bearded d'Anvers; Antwerp Belgian
- Country of origin: Belgium

Traits
- Weight: Male: 700 g; Female: 600 g
- Egg colour: creamy white
- Comb type: rose comb

Classification
- ABA: rose comb and clean legged
- Chicken; Gallus gallus domesticus

The Barbu d'Anvers, Dutch: Antwerpse baardkriel, is a breed of bantam chicken from Belgium. It is a true bantam, and has no full-sized counterpart; males weigh about 700 grams and hens about 600 g. The Barbu d'Anvers is one of the oldest bantam breeds, and is thought to have originated in the province of Antwerp (French: Anvers) in northern Flanders. It is the only Belgian bantam breed not threatened with extinction. In the United States it may be called the Antwerp Belgian or Belgian Bearded d'Anvers.

== History ==
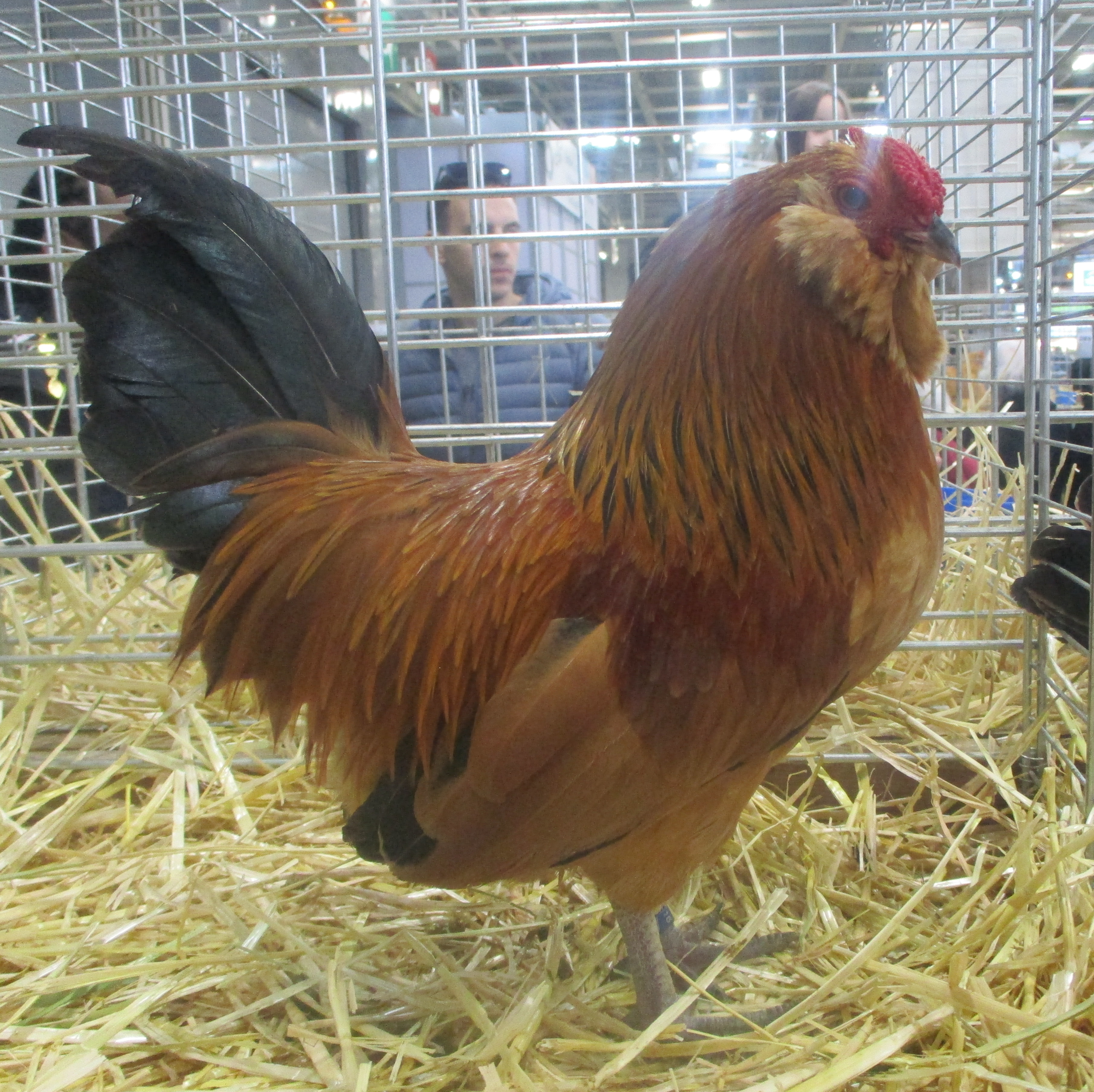
Buff Columbian cock

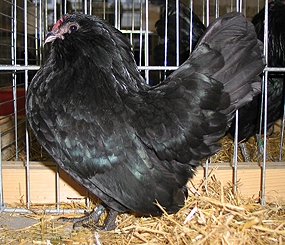
Black hen

The Barbu d'Anvers is among the oldest bantam breeds, and derives from small bearded chickens of the Low Countries similar to those depicted in the paintings of Aelbert Cuyp in the seventeenth century. The first reliable written mention of it dates from 1858, and the first description is that of Victor La Perre De Roo in 1882. From about 1890 there was growing interest in the breed, and by 1910 the Club Avicole du Barbu Nain, the breeder's club, had nearly five hundred members.

It is the only Belgian bantam breed not threatened with extinction. A census in 2005 found 1500 birds in Belgium.

The Barbu d'Anvers has a tail-less variant, the Barbu de Grubbe, and is the predecessor of other Belgian bantam breeds such as the Barbu d'Uccle and the Barbu d'Everberg. It was included the Standard of Perfection of the American Poultry Association in 1949.

== Characteristics ==
The Barbu d'Anvers is a diminutive bird with a large, round breast that juts forward, and an arching tail. As its name implies, it has a profuse beard of feathers that covers the earlobes. It has a small rose comb and small or non-existent wattles. In Belgium 29 colour varieties of plumage are recognised; in Germany there are six more.

== Use ==
The Barbu d'Anvers is a purely ornamental breed, kept either as a pet or by poultry fanciers for showing. Hens lay small creamy white eggs usually weighing less than 35 g; they are good mothers and good sitters.
