= List of breeds in the Australian Poultry Standards =

The Australian Poultry Standards is the primary benchmark of exhibition poultry in Australia, covering chickens, turkey, geese, ducks and guinea fowl.

== Chickens ==
Breed	Classification	Image
American Game fowl	light breed hardfeather	
Ancona	light breed softfeather	
Andalusian	light breed softfeather	
Araucana	light breed softfeather	
Asil	light breed hardfeather	
Australian Game	heavy breed hardfeather	
Australian Pit Game	heavy and light breed hardfeather	
Australian Langshan	light breed softfeather	
Australorp	heavy breed softfeather	
Barnevelder	heavy breed softfeather	
Belgian bantam	true bantam softfeather light breed	
Brahma	heavy breed softfeather	
Campine	light breed softfeather	
Cochin	heavy breed softfeather	
Croad Langshan	heavy breed softfeather	
Dorking	heavy breed softfeather	
Faverolles	heavy breed softfeather	
Frizzle	heavy breed softfeather	
Hamburgh	heavy breed softfeather	
Houdan	light breed softfeather	
Indian Game	heavy breed hardfeather	
Japanese bantam	true bantam softfeather light breed	
Jungle Fowl	light breed hardfeather	
Legbar	light breed softfeather	
Leghorn	light breed softfeather	
Malay Game	heavy breed softfeather	
Marans	heavy breed softfeather	
Minorca	light breed softfeather	
Modern Game	heavy breed hardfeather	
New Hampshire	heavy breed softfeather	
Old English Game	light breed hardfeather	
Orpington	heavy breed softfeather	
Pekin bantam	true bantam softfeather heavy breed	
Phoenix	light breed softfeather	
Plymouth Rock	heavy breed softfeather	
Polish	light breed softfeather	
Rhode Island (both Red & White)	heavy breed softfeather	
Rosecomb	true bantam softfeather light breed	
Sebright	true bantam softfeather light breed	
Shamo	heavy breed hardfeather	
Sicilian Buttercup	light breed softfeather	
Silkie	light breed softfeather	
Spanish	light breed softfeather	
Sumatra	light breed hardfeather	
Sultan	light breed softfeather	
Sussex	heavy breed softfeather	
Transylvanian Naked Neck	heavy breed softfeather	
Welsummer	light breed softfeather	
Wyandotte	heavy breed softfeather	
Yokohama	light breed softfeather	

== Ducks ==
Breed	Classification	Image
Abacot Ranger	light	
Australian Call	bantam	
Aylesbury duck	heavy	
Bali duck	light	
Black East Indian duck	bantam	
Blue Swedish	heavy	
Campbell duck	light	
Cayuga duck	heavy	
Crested duck	light	
Elizabeth duck	light	
Indian Runner	light	
Magpie duck	light	
Mallard	bantam	
Muscovy duck	heavy	
Orpington Duck	light	
Pekin duck	heavy	
Pommern duck	light	
Rouen Clair	heavy	
Rouen duck	heavy	
Saxony duck	heavy	
Silver Appleyard duck	heavy	
Watervale duck	heavy	
Welsh harlequin	light	

Call duck. bantam.

== Geese ==
Breed	Image
African goose	
Australian Settler	
Brecon Buff Goose	
Chinese goose	
Embden goose	
Pomeranian goose	
Roman Goose	
Sebastopol Goose	
Toulouse goose	

== Turkey ==
Colour	Image
Black turkey	
Slate Blue turkey	
Bourbon Red	
Bronze turkey	
Buff turkey	
Narragansett Turkey	
Royal Palm turkey	
White turkey	

== Guinea fowl ==
Colour	Image
Pearl	
Lavender	
Cinnamon	
Pied	
White	
