= Langshan =

Langshan may refer to:

== Mountains ==
- Mount Langshan, in Hunan, China
- Lang Mountains, mountain range in Inner Mongolia, China
- Langshan (Nantong), hill in Nantong, China

== Chicken breeds ==
- Croad Langshan
- German Langshan
- Australian Langshan
- Modern Langshan
- Blue Langshan
