= Australian Game =

Australian breed of fighting chicken

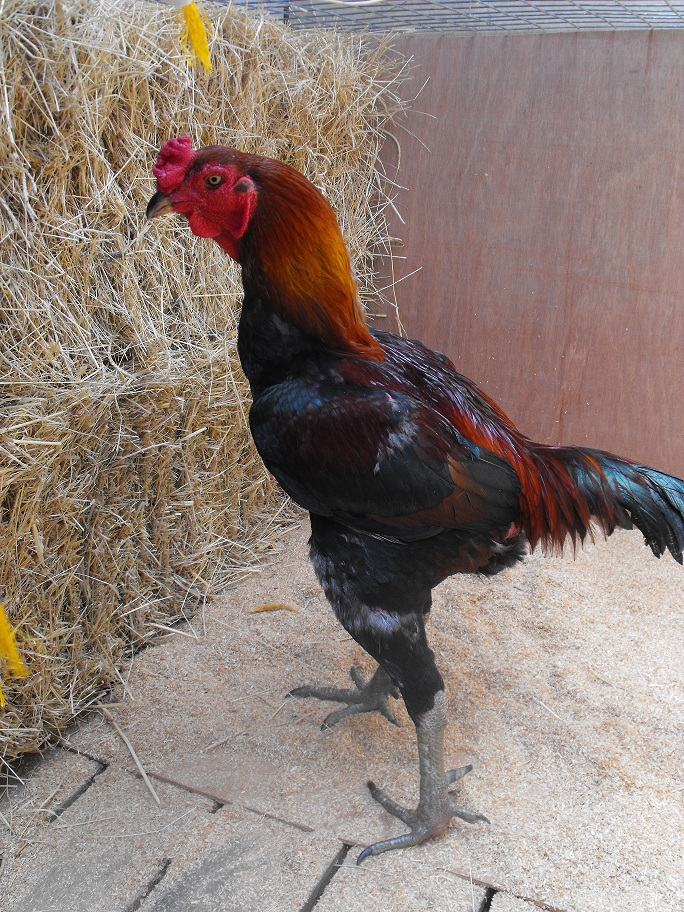
- A cockerel
- Other names: Colonial; Aussie Game
- Country of origin: Australia
- Use: formerly for cockfighting and for meat, now for exhibition

Traits
- Weight: Male: 5.45 kg; Female: 4.75 kg
- Skin color: white
- Comb type: pea comb

Classification
- Chicken; Gallus gallus domesticus

The Australian Game is an Australian breed of fighting chicken. It is not known when it was developed; it may have been in the mid- or late nineteenth century. It is alternatively known as Colonial, Aussie Game or sometimes just Aussie.

== History ==
The Australian Game was developed in the nineteenth century in the state of New South Wales, Australia. It was originally bred for cockfighting and meat production, and was developed from a mix of Australian Pit Game, Malay Game, Old English Game, Modern Game and Asil. It was originally called the Colonial and was highly prized for its great courage and stamina in the pit. It was reported to be gentle and tame towards the owner. Their Malay background meant that it was quite leggy and that was highly regarded at the time.

== Characteristics ==
The standard weight according to the Australian Poultry Standard is 5.45 kilograms for cocks and 4.55 kg for hens.

== Use ==
It is now principally an exhibition bird, but was formerly reared for meat.
