= Orpington (disambiguation) =

Orpington may refer to:

- Orpington, a town in Greater London
  - Orpington railway station
  - Orpington (UK Parliament constituency)
  - Orpington (electoral division)
  - Orpington (ward)
  - Orpington F.C., a football club
- Orpington chicken, a breed of chicken
- Orpington Duck, a breed of duck
