= Australian Poultry Standards =

The cover of the 1998 first edition

The Australian Poultry Standards is the official breed standard for poultry fancy in Australia. It is the standard of perfection from which all poultry in Australia is supposed to be judged when exhibited at poultry shows. It is published by Victorian Poultry Fanciers Association, the peak body for poultry in Victoria and agreed to by all other state peak bodies.

== Publication ==
Published by the Victorian Poultry Fanciers Association Inc., the first edition of the Australian Poultry Standard was published in 1998. It has been replaced by the second edition.

Australia has no national peak body for poultry, relying on state bodies and national breed clubs. The state bodies who are party to the standards are as follows (None of the mainland territories have a statewide poultry society)

- Victorian Poultry Fanciers Association (trades as Poultry Stud Breeders and Exhibitors Victoria) (founded 1970)
- Tasmanian Poultry Fanciers Association
- South Australian Poultry Association
- Exhibition Poultry Association of New South Wales
- Western Australian Poultry Association (founded 1889)
- Feather Clubs Association of Queensland (founded 1959)

== Classification of breeds ==
The Australian Poultry Standard classifies all chicken breeds as either hard feather or soft feather, and then further divides them into the bantam or standard size. Breeds which have less under fluff and feathers which are closer to the body fall under hard feather, such as the Old English Game and Asil. Breeds with more under fluff and softer feathers, such as the Silkie, Australorp and Leghorn, are classed as soft feather.

The Australian Poultry Standards also includes standards for ducks, geese, turkeys and Guinea fowl. Ducks are divided into two classes, bantam or standard size, and all turkeys, geese and guinea fowl have only one class each.

== Earlier publications ==
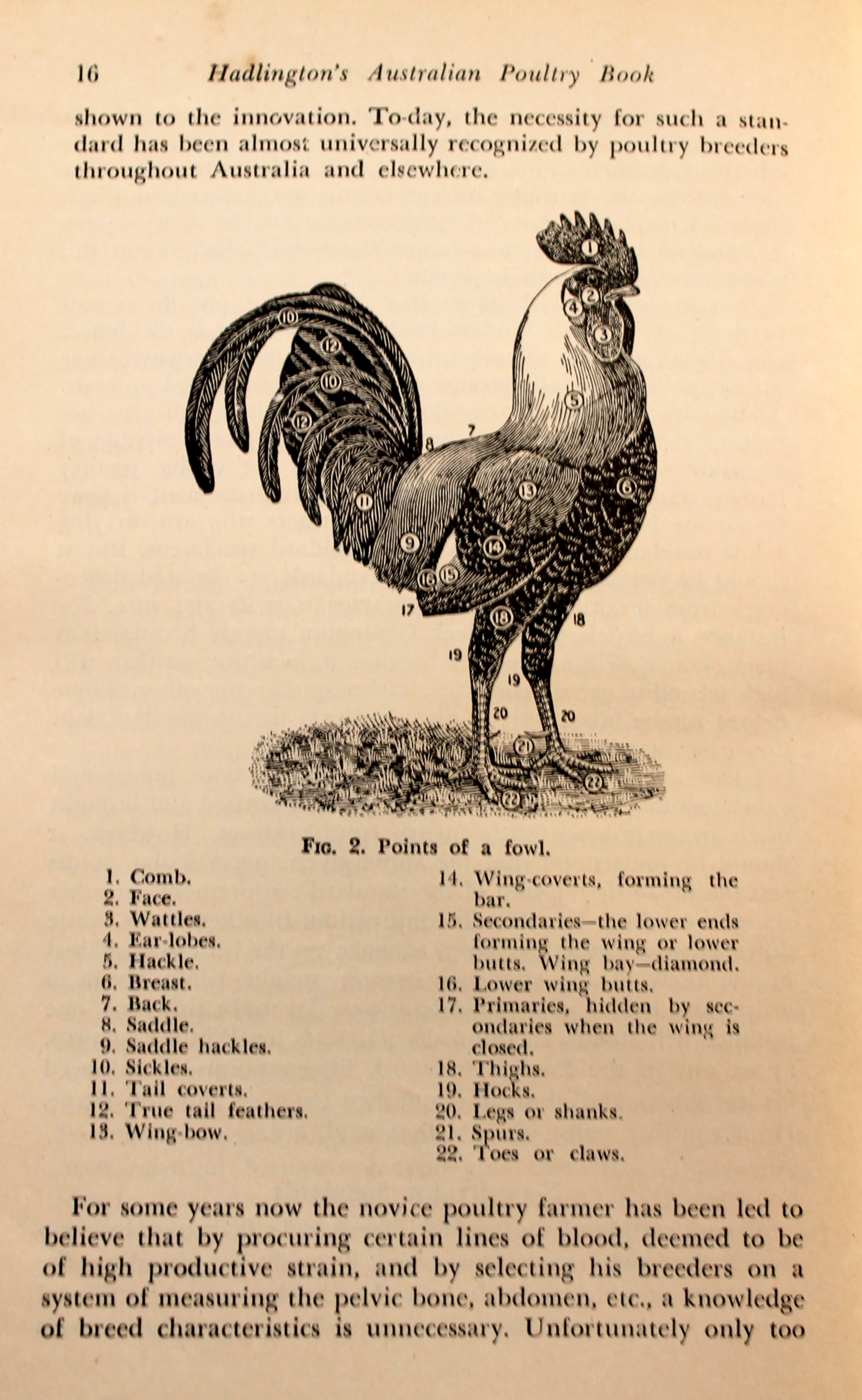
Hadlingtons' Points of Fowl from the 1940s

In the 1940s and earlier, other publications in Australia about poultry, such as Hadlingtons, did have some parts devoted to aspects of showing birds, were less oriented towards show standards, and more detailed about general management of poultry, in line with his earliest publication.

== See also ==
- List of breeds in the Australian Poultry Standards
