= Australorp =

Australian breed of chicken

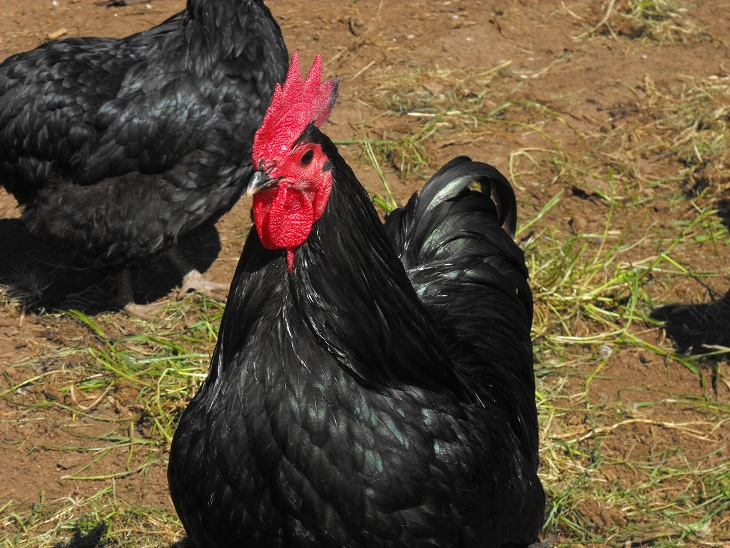
- A black cock
- Conservation status: Australia: DAD-IS (2024): at risk/endangered; World-wide: FAO (2007): not at risk; DAD-IS (2024): not at risk
- Other names: Black Australorp; Australian Orpington
- Country of origin: Australia
- Standard: Australorp Club of Australia
- Use: dual-purpose breed: eggs, meat

Traits
- Weight: Male: Large: 3.20–4.10 kg Bantam: 0.96–1.23 kg; Female: Large: 2.25–3.10 kg Bantam: 0.79–1.04 kg
- Skin colour: white
- Egg colour: brown
- Comb type: single

Classification
- APA: English
- EE: yes
- PCGB: soft feather: heavy
- APS: heavy breed softfeather
- Chicken; Gallus gallus domesticus

The Australorp is an Australian breed of dual-purpose utility chicken. It derives from the British Black Orpington, and was selectively bred for egg-laying performance; some hens lay more than 300 eggs per year. It achieved world-wide popularity in the 1920s after the breed broke numerous world records for number of eggs laid and has been a popular breed in the western world since. It is one of eight poultry breeds created in Australia and recognised by the Australian Poultry Standards. The original plumage colour is black, which is the only colour recognised in the United States of America, but blue and white are also recognised in Australia and the Poultry Club South Africa recognises buff, splash, wheaten laced and golden in addition.

== History ==
The original stock used in the development of the Australorp was imported to Australia from England out of the Black Orpington yards of William Cook and Joseph Partington in the period from 1890 to the early 1900s with Rhode Island Red. Local breeders used this stock together with judicious out-crossings of Minorca, White Leghorn and Langshan blood to improve the utility features of the imported Orpingtons. There is even a report of some Plymouth Rock blood also being used. The emphasis of the early breeders was on utility features. At this time, the resulting birds were known as Australian Black Orpingtons (Austral-orp).

The origin of the name "Australorp" means Australian chicken and it seems to be shrouded in as much controversy as the attempts to obtain agreement between the States over a suitable national Standard. The earliest claim to the name was made by one of poultry fancy's institutions, Wiliam Wallace Scott, before the First World War. From 1925 Wal Scott set to work to have Australorp recognised as a breed with the Poultry Society as he developed the breed. Equally as persuasive a claim came in 1919 from Arthur Harwood who suggested that the "Australian Laying Orpingtons" be named "Australs". The letters "orp" were suggested as a suffix to denote the major breed in the fowl's development. A further overseas claim to the name came from Britain's W. Powell-Owen who drafted the British Standard for the breed in 1921 following the importation of the "Australian Utility Black Orpingtons". It is certain that the name "Australorp" was being used in the early 1920s when the breed was launched internationally. The Australorp was added to the Standard of Perfection of the American Poultry Association in 1929.

A white colour variety was bred in South Africa the 1930s, and in Australia in the 1940s. It was recognised in Australia in 2012. A bantam Australorp was bred in the early 1930s by Roy Corner and Jack Mann, and was first exhibited at a poultry show in 1934.

The Australorp is reported in all five inhabited continents, in seventeen countries of which four report a population of 1000 or more: Australia, Serbia, Slovakia and the United States. In 2024 the world-wide population was estimated at close to 16000, with an overall conservation status of "not at risk". The risk status in Australia was listed as "at/risk/endangered" in DAD-IS, while in the United Kingdom it was listed as "priority" on the watchlist of the Rare Breeds Survival Trust. In the United States it was removed from the watchlist of the Livestock Conservancy in 2023.

== Characteristics ==
There are both bantam and standard-sized Australorps.

Three colours are recognised in the Australian Poultry Standards: black, white and blue; the same three colours are recognised by the Entente Européenne and by the Poultry Club of Great Britain. The Poultry Club South Africa recognises a further four colours: buff, splash, wheaten laced, and golden.

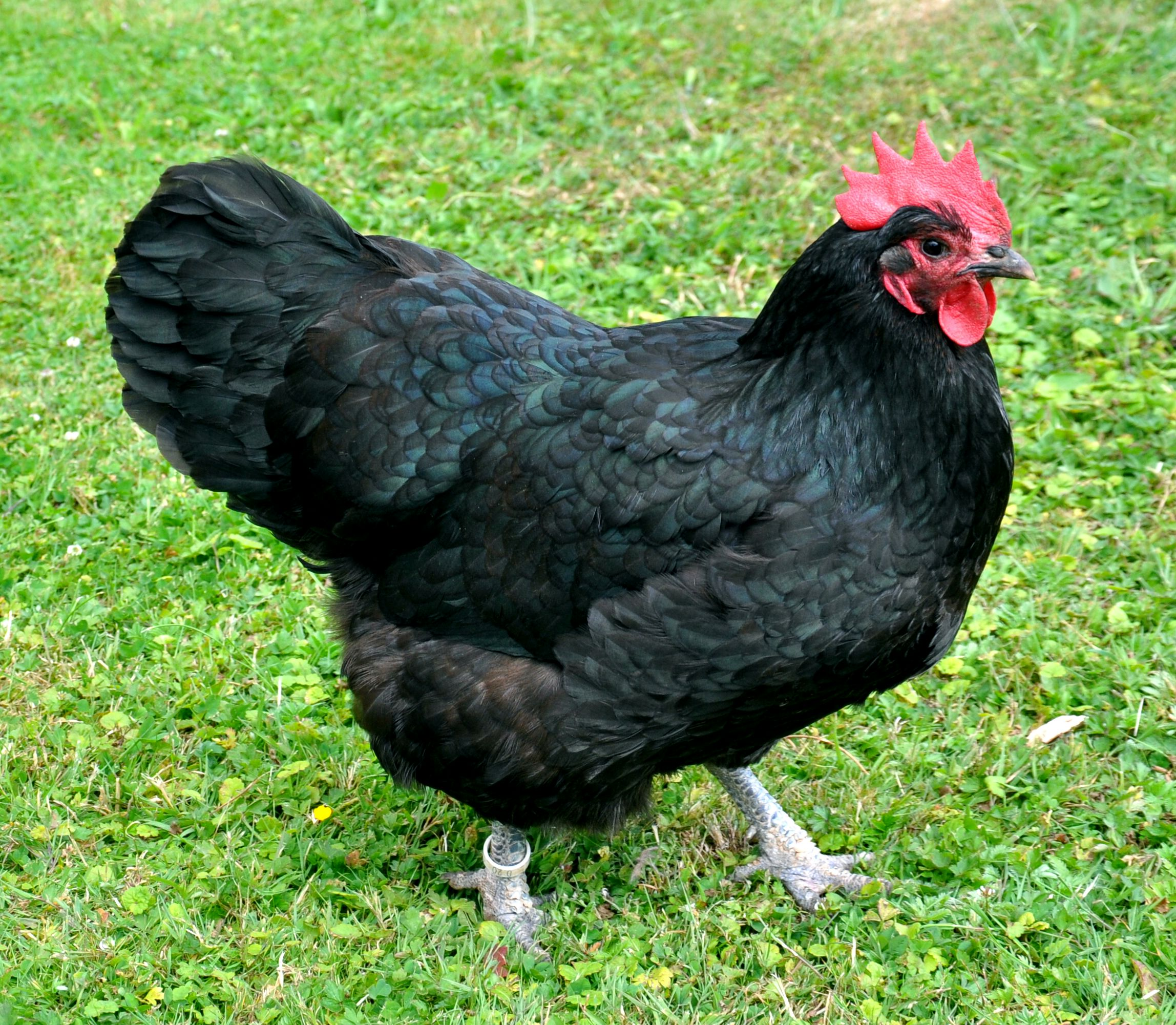
Black hen

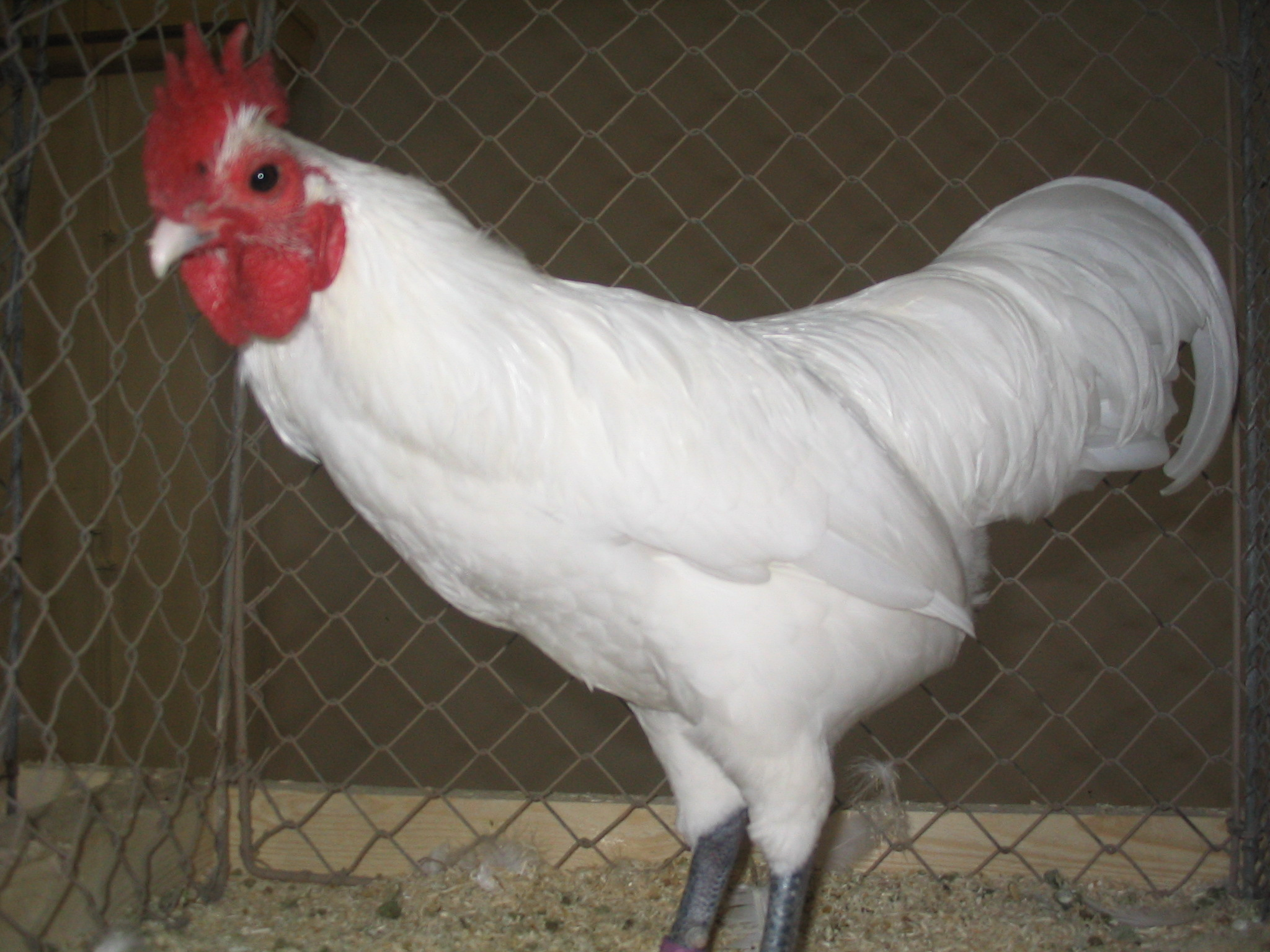
White bantam cock

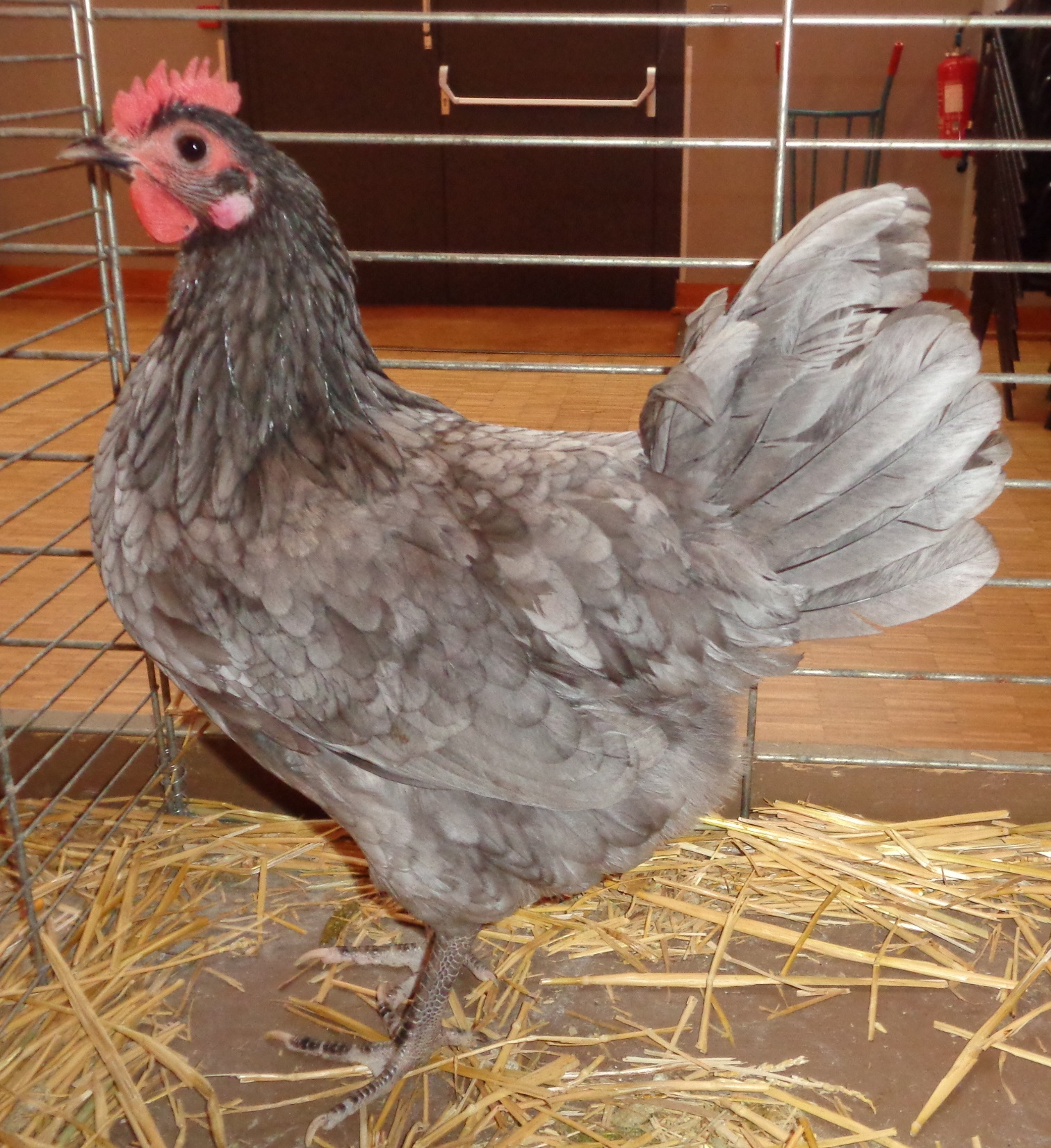
Blue bantam hen

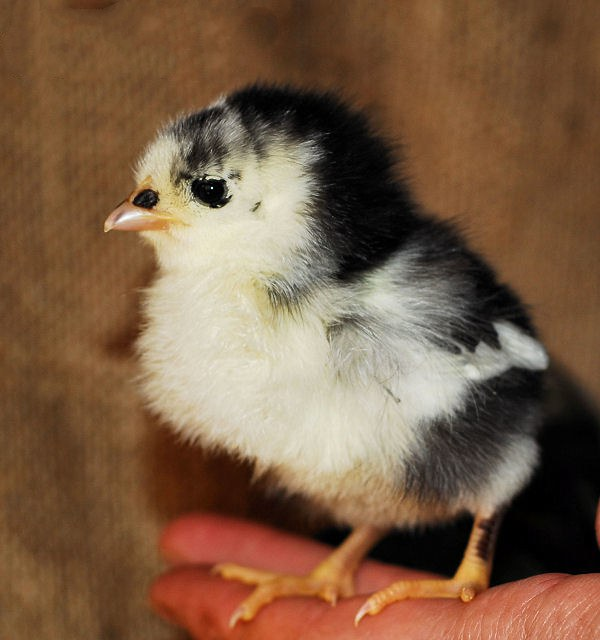
Three-day-old chick

== Use ==
The egg-laying performance of Australorps attracted attention when in 1922–1923, a team of six hens set a world record by laying 1857 eggs for an average of 309.5 eggs per hen during a 365 consecutive day trial. These figures were achieved without the lighting regimens of the modern intensive shed. Such performances had importation orders flooding in from England, United States of America, South Africa, Canada and Mexico. A new record was set when a hen laid 364 eggs in 365 days. They are also known to be good nest sitters and mothers, making them one of the most popular large heritage utility breeds of chicken.

Hens lay approximately 190 light brown eggs per year, with an average weight of 55 g; bantam hens lay some 160 per year, averaging 40 g in weight.
