= Orpington chicken =

British breed of domestic chicken

Orpington
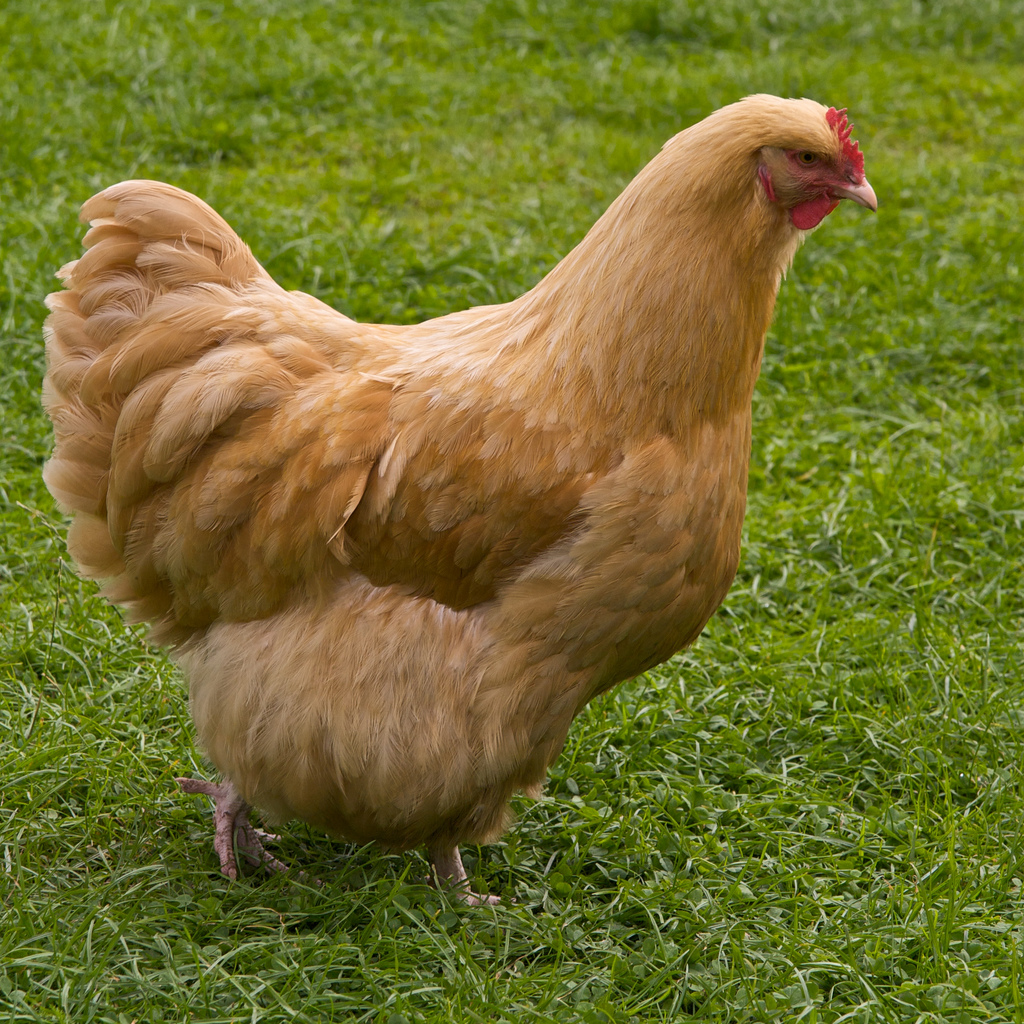
- A buff hen
- Country of origin: United Kingdom
- Standard: The Orpington Club (UK); Orpington Club of Australia
- Use: showing

Traits
- Weight: Male: 3.60–4.55 kg; Female: 2.70–3.60 kg
- Skin colour: white
- Egg colour: brown
- Comb type: medium single

Classification
- APA: English
- PCGB: soft feather: heavy
- Chicken; Gallus gallus domesticus

The Orpington is a British breed of chicken. It was bred in the late nineteenth century by William Cook of Orpington, at that time in Kent in south-east England. It was intended to be a dual-purpose breed, to be reared both for eggs and for meat, but soon became exclusively a show bird. The Australorp of Australia derives from it.

== History ==
The original Black Orpington was bred by William Cook in the 1880s in Orpington, which at that time was in Kent in south-east England. He crossed Minorcas, Langshans and Plymouth Rocks to create a new hybrid bird. It was bred as a dual-purpose utility chicken, to be reared both for eggs and for meat; Cook chose black as a colour that would not show the soot and grime of London. He was also the breeder of the Orpington Duck.

Black Orpingtons were exhibited at the Dairy Show in Islington in 1886, and also at shows in The Crystal Palace in Sydenham and in Birmingham. A separate show class was created for them in 1888. From the early 1890s, large black Langshan–Cochin crosses were being exhibited and marketed as Orpingtons by Joseph Partington of Lytham in Lancashire and other breeders. These birds were unrelated to Cook's and although similar in appearance, did not have the same productive qualities. They were larger and had fuller feathering, and won numerous prizes at poultry shows; some were sold for very large sums. A bantam buff Orpington was bred by Herman Kuhn in Germany in about 1900.

A breed society, the Orpington Club, was started in 1887. Several clubs were later formed for individual colour varieties; in 1975 many of these merged with the Orpington Bantam Club to form a second Orpington Club.

The Australorp of Australia derives from – and resembles – Cook's original black stock, and preserves its productive qualities.

In the United States four colours – black, blue, buff and white – were added to the Standard of Perfection of the American Poultry Association in 1960.

== Characteristics ==
Seven colour varieties are recognised by the Poultry Club of Great Britain: black, blue, buff, cuckoo, jubilee, spangled and white. The Entente Européenne recognises thirteen colours, and lists two more. In the bantam, only the colours black, blue, buff and white are recognised by the Poultry Club of Great Britain, but several others have been bred; the Entente Européenne lists sixteen, of which eleven are recognised. The British poultry geneticist W.C. Carefoot bred a chocolate-coloured bantam in the 1990s, a colour previously unknown in chickens, caused by a sex-linked recessive gene. The bantam rarely takes flight.

Body weights for large fowl are approximately 3–3.5 kg for hens and 4–4.5 kg for cocks; average weights for bantams are 1.3 kg and 1.5 kg respectively.

== Use ==
Orpington hens lay about 180 light brown eggs per year, with an average weight of 53 g; bantam hens lay about 110 eggs, with a weight of some 40 g.

It was said that at one time Orpingtons were capable of laying as many as 340 eggs per year. The decline in production was due to breeders selecting for looks over utility.

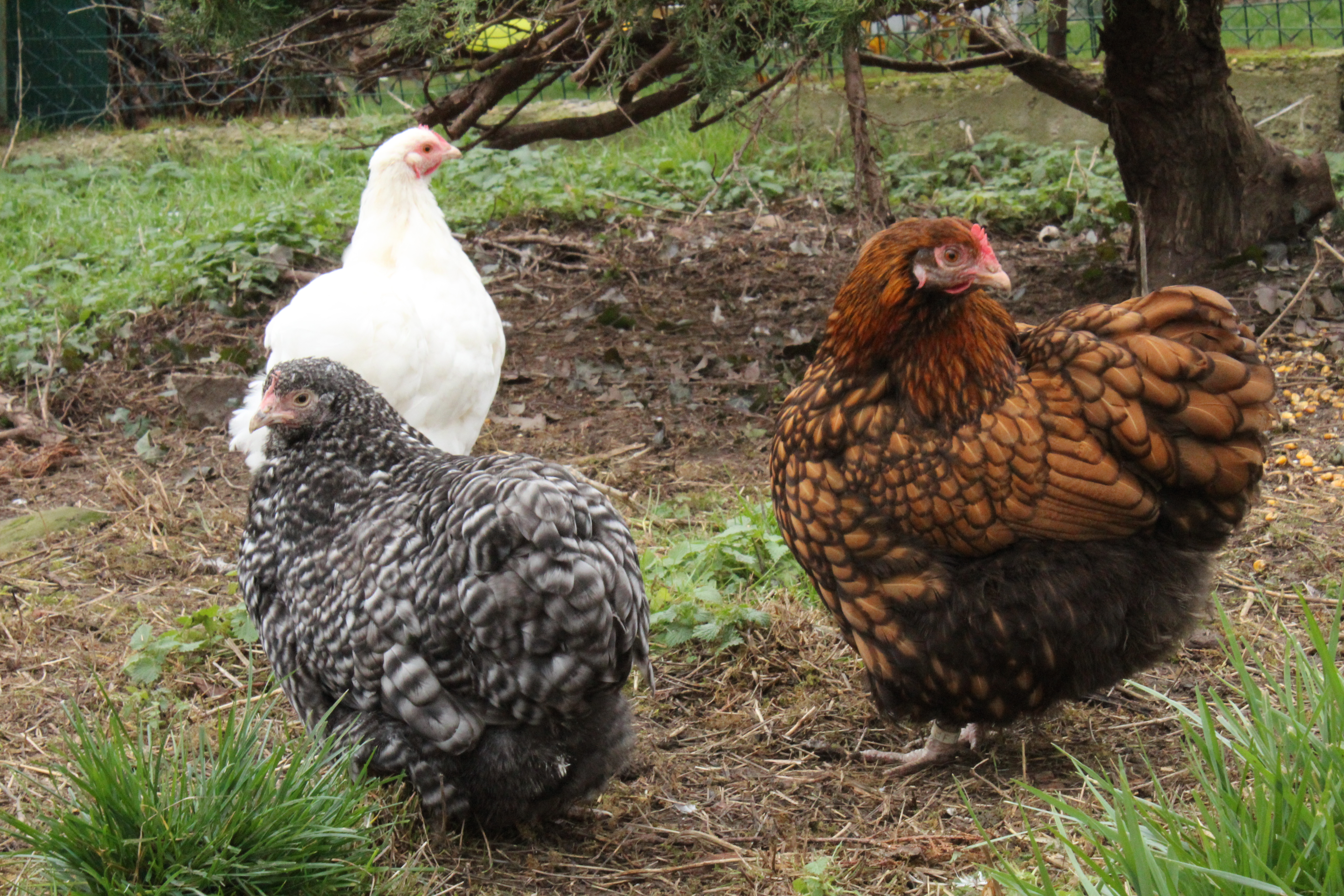
White, barred and gold-laced hens

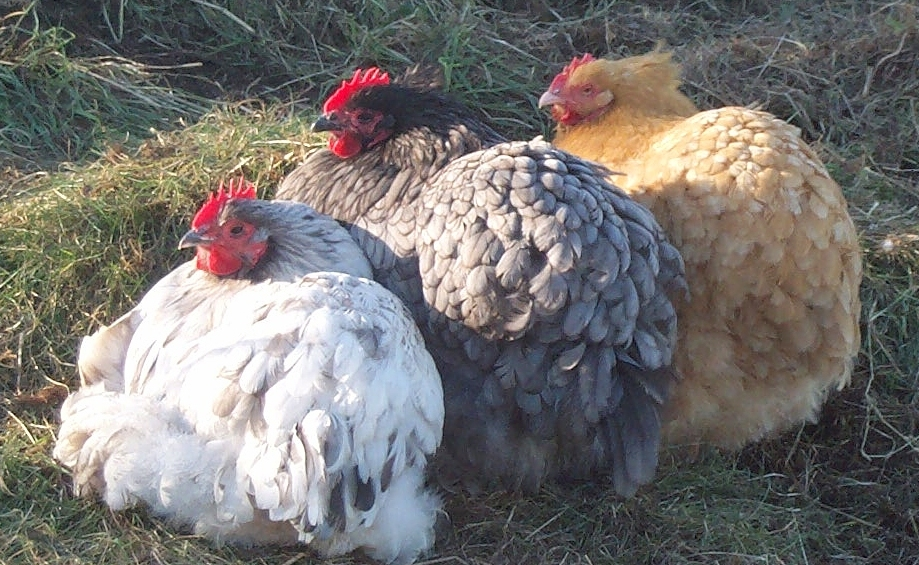
Splash, blue and buff hens

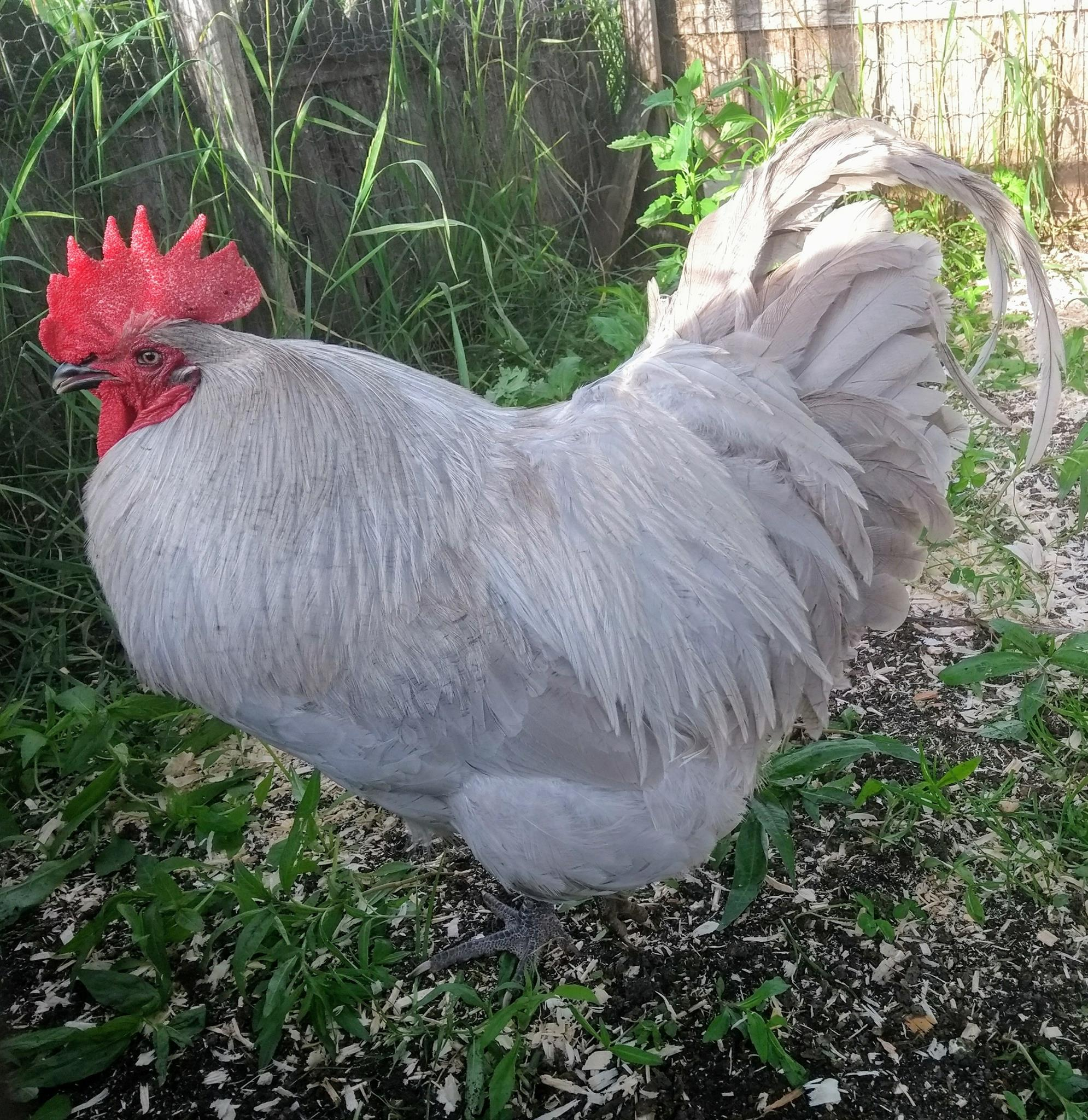
Lavender cock

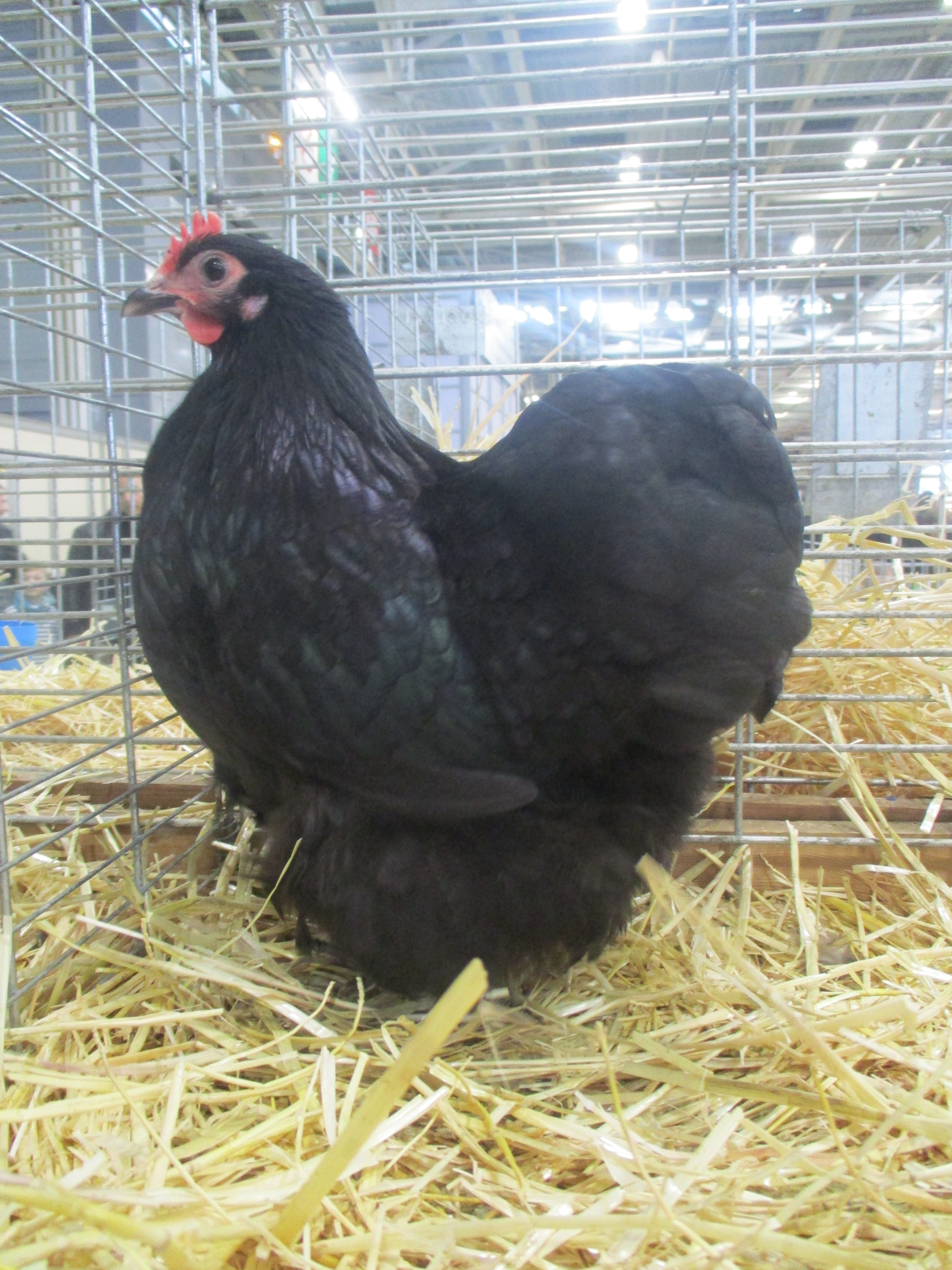
Black bantam hen

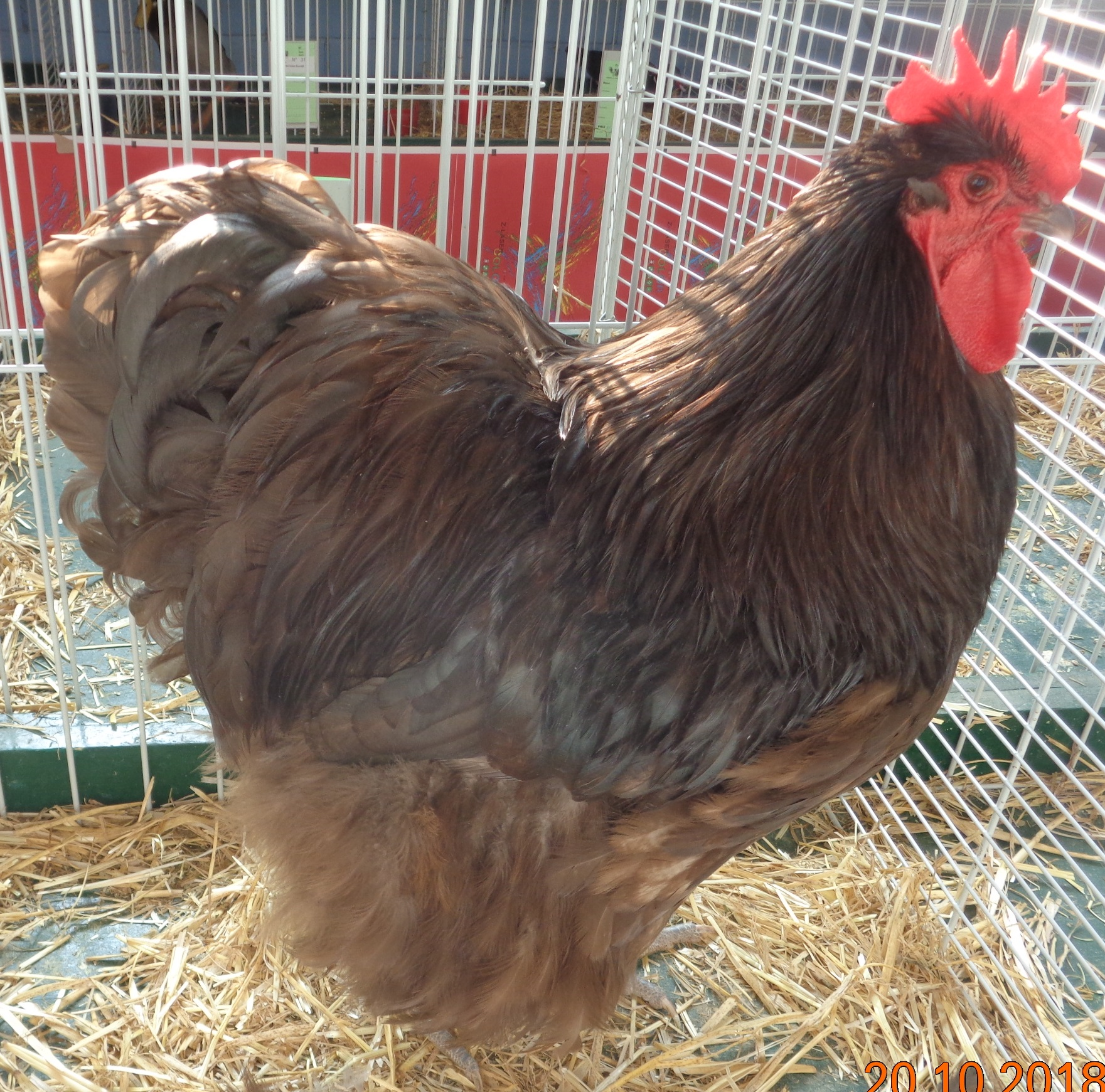
Chocolate cock
