= Australian Pit Game fowl =

Breed of chicken

Australian Pit Game
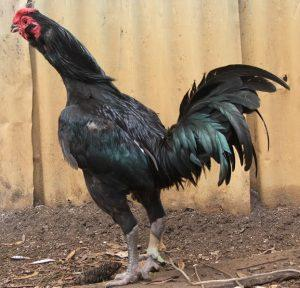
- Other names: Pit Game, Australian Pit
- Country of origin: Australia

Traits
- Weight: Male: 2.7 kg; Female: 2.0 kg
- Egg color: Tinted
- Comb type: Varies

Classification
- APS: heavy and light breed hardfeather

Notes
- Pea, Single or Triple
- Chicken; Gallus gallus domesticus

The Australian Pit Game is a breed of chicken, developed in Australia in the early 1900s for cockfighting by British soldiers stationed in New South Wales.

== History ==
Australian Pit Game have been standardised since 1936, when the original standard was drawn up by the Big Game Club of Australia. A bantam variety was standardised in 1981 by the Bantam Club of New South Wales and the Pit Game Club of Australia, founded the same year. They were included in the inaugural Australian Poultry Standards in 1998.

== Development ==
The Australian Poultry Standards suggest they were developed from crosses of English Pit Fowl (or Old English Game), Malay Game and Asil, while the Pit Game Club of Australia lists the possible addition of Sumatra blood.

== Standard and description ==
Australian Pit Game are one of the most loosely standardised breeds in Australia. The 2012 edition of the Australian Poultry Standards states "Pit Game may be big or small, single or pea combed, any colour whatever, cock feathered, hen feathered, muffled or tasseled."

Due to their ancestry as fighting birds, the standard does not regard colour as important (stating it is "immaterial") and instead focuses on health and vigor. It states carriage should be proud and aggressive-looking, with movements quick and "ready for any emergency". They should have a heart-shaped body, a short and flat back with well-developed deltoid muscles, a broad and prominent chest with well-defined pectoral muscles. The belly should be free from fluffy feathers, and compact and tight; wings should be powerful and long; and the tail is to be of medium length, and not drooping but to be governed by the character of the fowl.

It lists many disqualifications, including flat-sidedness, thin thighs or neck, soft flesh, fluffy plumage, clumsy carriage, or white lobes. Standardised weights are broken into three categories instead of the usual two, stating "over 2.7 kg" for heavy males, and "over 2 kg" for heavy females. Under 2.7 kg and 2.0 kg, respectively, for light males and females, and under 1.36 kg and 1.135 kg for bantam males and females, respectively.
