= German Langshan =

Breed of chicken

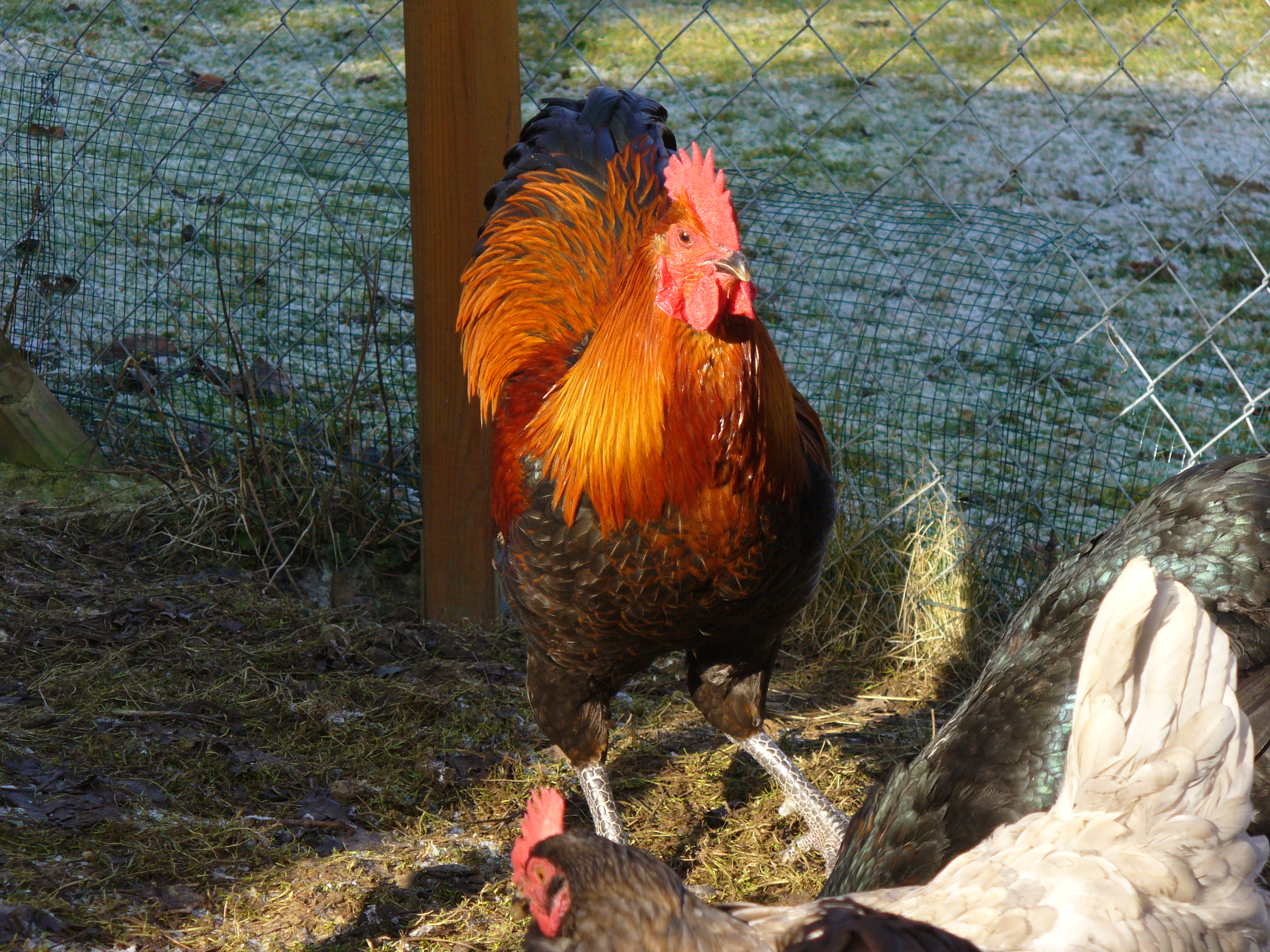
- Country of origin: China; Germany
- Use: ornamental, meat

Traits
- Weight: Male: 3.0–4.5 kg; Female: 2.5–3.5 kg
- Egg colour: cream
- Comb type: single

Classification
- Chicken; Gallus gallus domesticus

The German Langshan is a breed of chicken developed from the exported Croad Langshan in Germany. It is a large, robust breed of exceptional height. Though most often raised for show, it has practical application as a layer and meat bird, as well. The standard-sized German Langshan is uncommon in both the United States and the United Kingdom, but the bantam form is popular in the latter.

== History ==
The Croad Langshan was first shipped to the United Kingdom in 1969, and thence to Germany. Along with the Minorca and Plymouth Rock, the Croad Langshan was used in the creation of the German Langshan. Through selective breeding, this resulted in a brown-tinted fowl, distinctly different from other Langshan varieties which are normally only recognised as having white, black or blue feathering. The German Langshan's creation was completed by the early twentieth century.

== Appearance ==
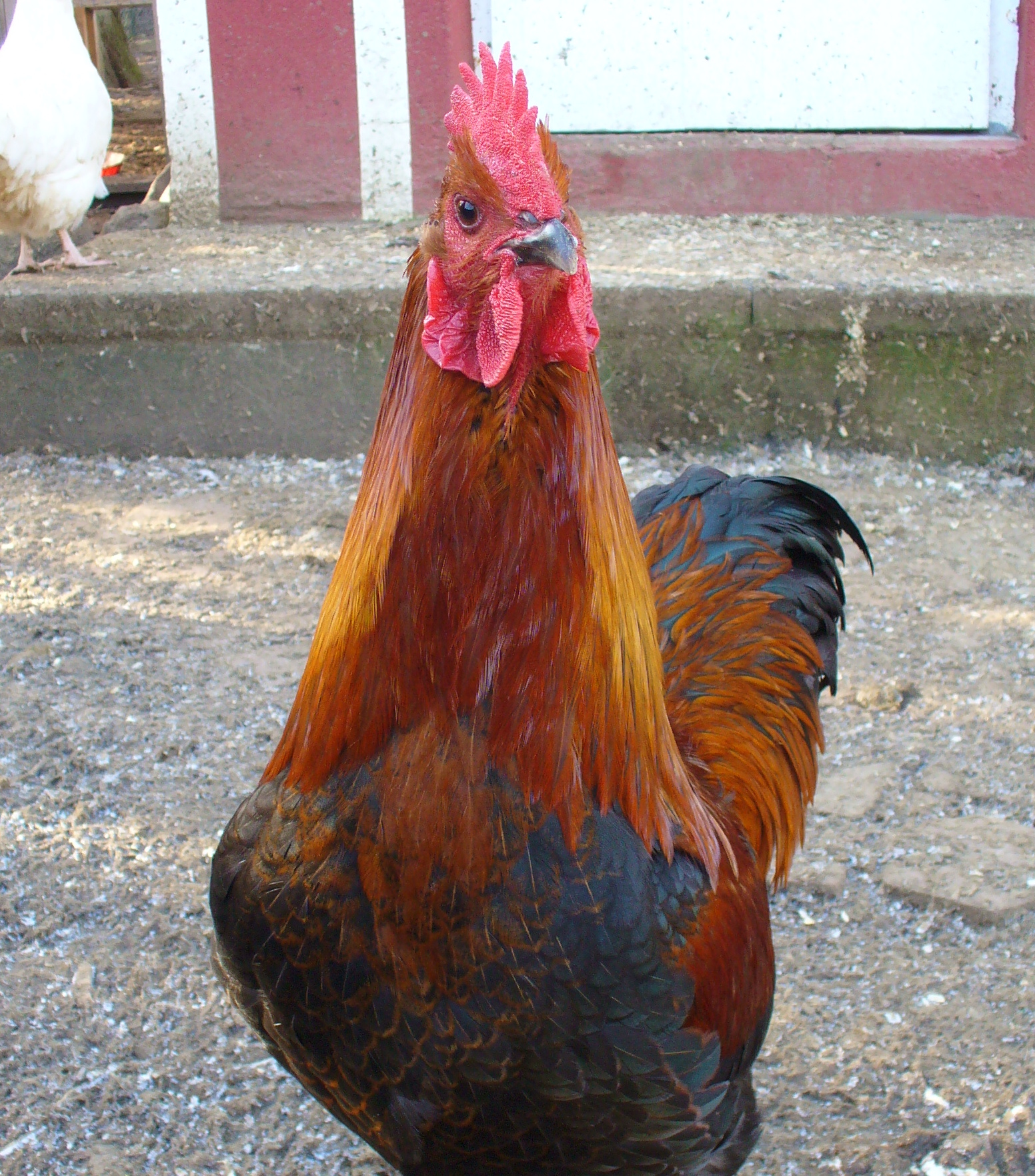
A German Langshan cockerel

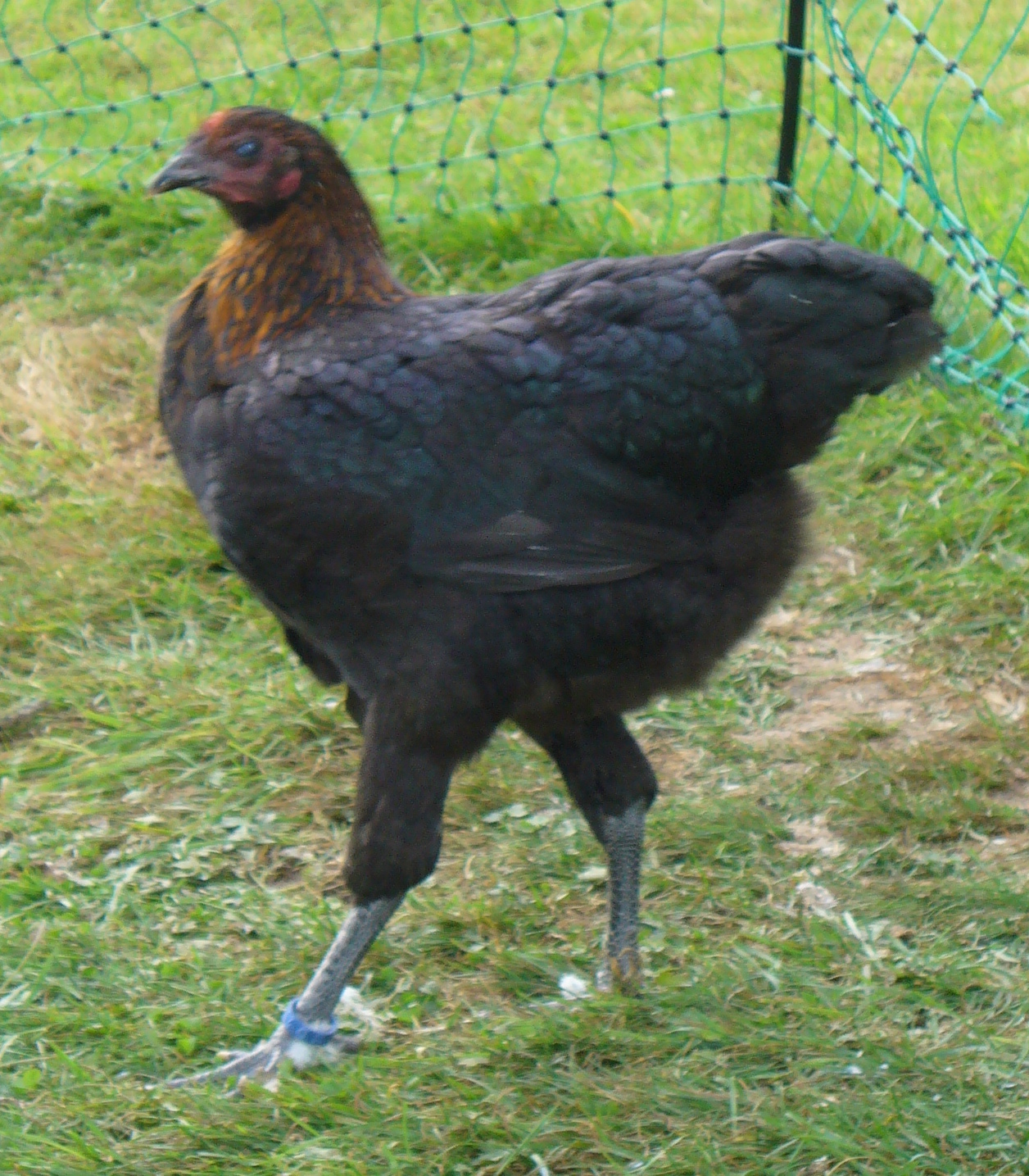
A hen, displaying the remarkably long legs

The German Langshan is a large, heavy chicken: roosters weigh about 9 pounds or 4 kilograms. The chickens have a contoured back and a relatively small tail. With its long legs and upright posture the breed's profile is often likened to a wine glass. They have a single comb. As said above, their legs are bare.

== Colors ==
The German Langshan is most often found in only three colours: Black, Blue, and White; others are known, but are rather rare.

== Characteristics ==
German Langshans are strong, vital chickens that grow up fast. They lay cream-colored eggs which are quite large. Their weight hinders flight. They can be tamed without much difficulty.

== See also ==
- Australian Langshan
- Croad Langshan
- Modern Langshan
- List of chicken breeds
