= Elizabeth duck =

Breed of duck

Elizabeth Duck
- Country of origin: Australia
- Distribution: Australia & New Zealand

Classification

The Elizabeth duck is a breed of domestic duck, originating in Australia. They were developed as a small, fast growing meat breed in 1972 by Lance Ruting in Merrylands, New South Wales and named after his wife, Ann Elizabeth Ruting. They are presently bred in Australia and New Zealand, but are not widely available and classified as endangered by the Rare Breeds Trust of Australia.

They come in only one colour and they are described as short, with a broad chest and round breast, slightly short legs and round head. Males have a glossy green head which ends at a white ring. Chest feathers claret coloured feathers and bordered in cream, off-white underbelly, charcoal grey feathers on back also ringed with white, solid black rump and dull black-brown tail. Females are fawn coloured, with brown marks in the center of each feather on the majority of the body. Off-white primaries spotted with grey, and blue-green secondary flight feathers. Both sexes have grey bills, dark brown eyes and bronze legs. Ducks of the breed are reported to be able to lay 100–150 eggs per year.

According to The Backyard Duck Book, the pedigree and status of the breed are controversial, and animals of the breed are sometimes not allowed to be shown.
