= Modern Langshan =

Breed of chicken

- Country of origin: United Kingdom
- Use: ornamental

Traits
- Weight: Male: Standard: 3.60–4.55 kg Bantam: 1133 g; Female: Standard: 2.70–3.60 kg Bantam: 910 g
- Egg color: brown
- Comb type: single

Classification
- APA: no
- EE: bantam only
- PCGB: rare soft feather: heavy
- Chicken; Gallus gallus domesticus

The Modern Langshan is a breed of chicken derived from the Croad Langshan. Though today it is rarely seen, the breed was at one time fairly popular.

== History ==
The Croad Langshan was brought to the United Kingdom from Northern China by Major F. Croad in 1872. In order to make a clearer contrast between the Croad Langshan and the then less generously feathered Black Cochin, the birds were bred to have longer legs, tighter feathering, and an overall higher carriage; resulting in the Modern Langshan. Their development, in the 1890s, would later be mirrored by the development of the German Langshan, in the early 1900s, which look quite similar to the Modern Langshan. Their popularity along with their numbers declined through the years.

== Characteristics ==
The Modern Langshan has a less heavy and more game-like build then the Croad Langshan, and is sometimes compared to the Modern Game in appearance. Its legs are only lightly feathered. The breed is chiefly ornamental, being a good producer of neither eggs nor meat.

== See also ==
- Australian Langshan
- Croad Langshan
- German Langshan
- List of chicken breeds
