= Australian Langshan =

Breed of chicken

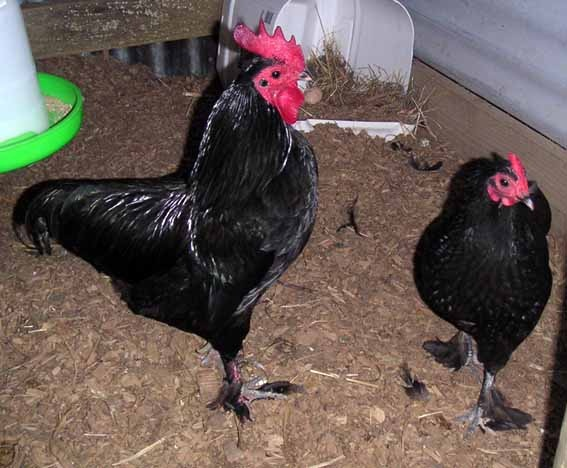
- Black bantams
- Conservation status: Common
- Other names: Australian Modern Langshan
- Country of origin: Australia
- Use: eggs, showing

Traits
- Weight: Male: 3.2 kg; Female: 2.7 kg
- Skin color: White
- Egg color: Brown
- Comb type: Single

Classification
- Chicken; Gallus gallus domesticus

The Australian Langshan is an Australian chicken breed, derived from the Croad Langshan and accepted by the Australian Poultry Standard as a recognized breed. The Australian Langshan is little known outside Australia but is a popular breed inside the country. The breed comes in both bantam and standard size.

== Uses ==
The Australian Langshan is a small black, blue or white bird, with an upright carriage, long legs and medium-sized straight comb, which should be red. Ideally, the outer toe of each foot should be feathered. The black variety is a glossy black with green sheen, while the blue colour should be an even grey-blue, although males often have dark blue on the tail or hackles. White Australian Langshans are pure white.

== History ==
The Australian Langshan was bred in Australia during the early 20th century by selective cross breeding of Croad Langshans, Orpingtons, Wakfer Chinese Langshan and Modern Langshan. Little is known about the history of the breed, but by the 1950s they were a popular breed across most of Australia. The breed was admitted to the Australian Poultry Standard in 1998 when the 1st Edition of the Australian Poultry Standard was released. The bantam variety was created soon after the large variety by breeders in New South Wales and was bred from small stock of the large Australian Langshan.

== See also ==
- German Langshan
- List of chicken breeds
