= Dairy Show =

British agricultural show

- Status: active
- Genre: agricultural show
- Frequency: annual
- Locations: 1876–1936: Agricultural Hall, Islington, London; 1937–1973: Olympia, London; 1974–2009: Stoneleigh Park, Warwickshire; since 2010: National Exhibition Centre, Birmingham
- Years active: 1876 – present
- Inaugurated: October 1876
- Organiser: Royal Association of British Dairy Farmers

The Dairy Show is an annual British agricultural show, organised by the Royal Association of British Dairy Farmers. It was founded in 1876 and was first held at the Agricultural Hall in Islington, London; it was later held at Olympia, London, and then moved to the National Agricultural Exhibition Centre at Stoneleigh Park, in Warwickshire. It is now held as part of the annual Livestock Event at the National Exhibition Centre, in Birmingham in the Midlands.

The show was originally known as the Metropolitan Dairy Show. Goats, pigs and poultry were included in the show from its earliest years. The introduction of milking trials and tests of butterfat and protein content of milk at the show in 1879 was both a response to, and a contributory factor in, the progressive trend towards selection of stock for productive traits rather than purely for physical appearance.

== The first Dairy Show ==
The first Dairy Show was held from 24 – 27 October 1876. Some 150 milch cows were shown; there were prizes of 100 guineas each for the best Channel Islands cow and for the best other-breed cow, which went to a Shorthorn. The total prize-money for cattle was 500 guineas, about half the total for the show. Butter and cheeses were exhibited, and there were demonstrations of cheese-making and butter-churning. One exhibitor entered more than 1000 Stilton cheeses in the show. Dairy equipment and machinery was exhibited and judged.

Other livestock, including goats and poultry, was also shown. There were about 500 entries in the poultry section, which included chickens, ducks, geese and turkeys. Hops, grains and roots were also exhibited.

The attendance at the exhibition was much greater than had been anticipated by the organisers. Special trains were laid on by the major railway companies, including the Great Northern, the Great Western, the London and South-Western, the London and North-Western and the Midland Railway.

The British Dairy Farmers' Association was formed at a meeting during the exhibition, at the instigation of J. Prince Sheldon.

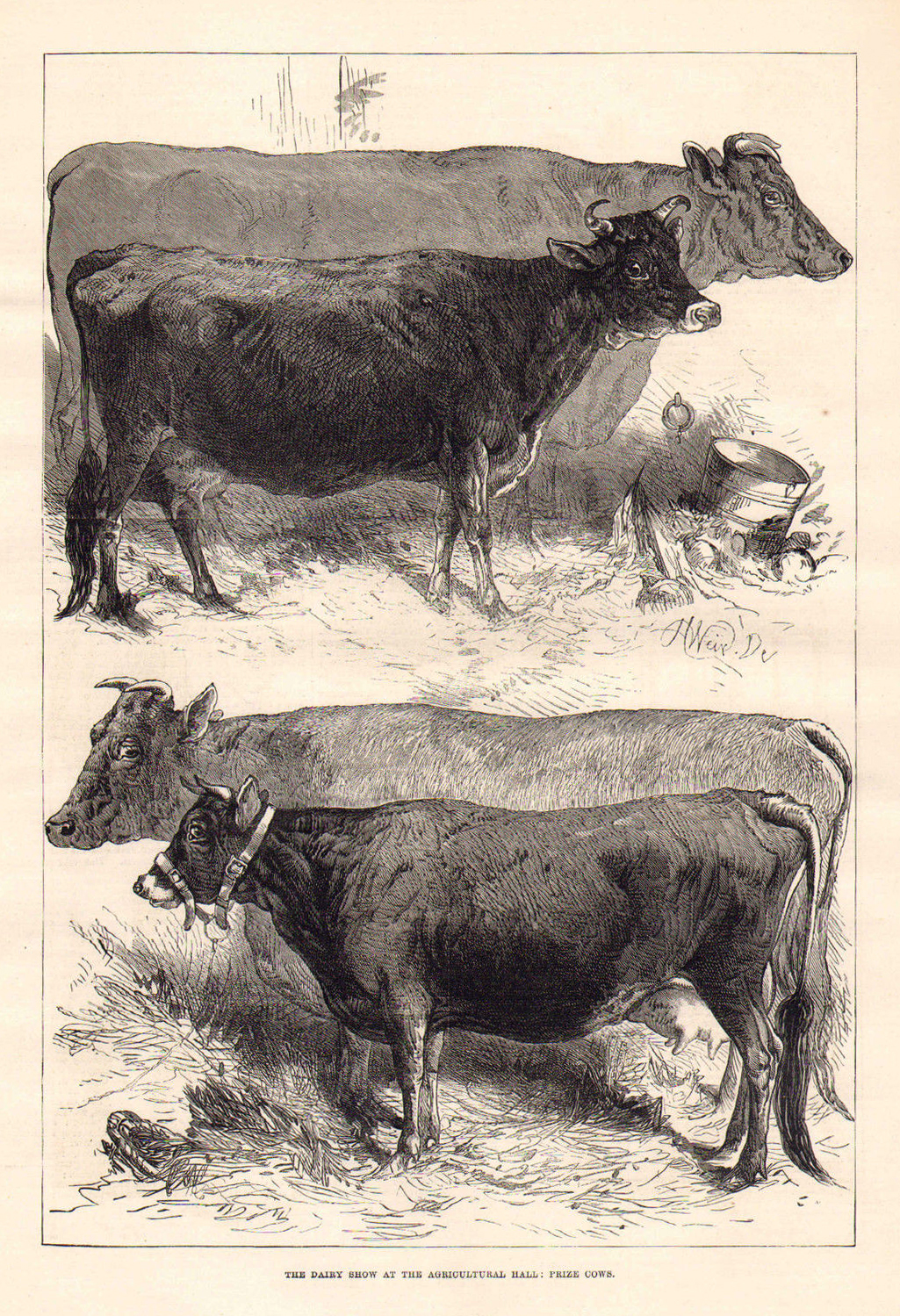
Harrison Weir, The Dairy Show at the Agriculture Hall: Prize Cows; The Illustrated London News, 1876

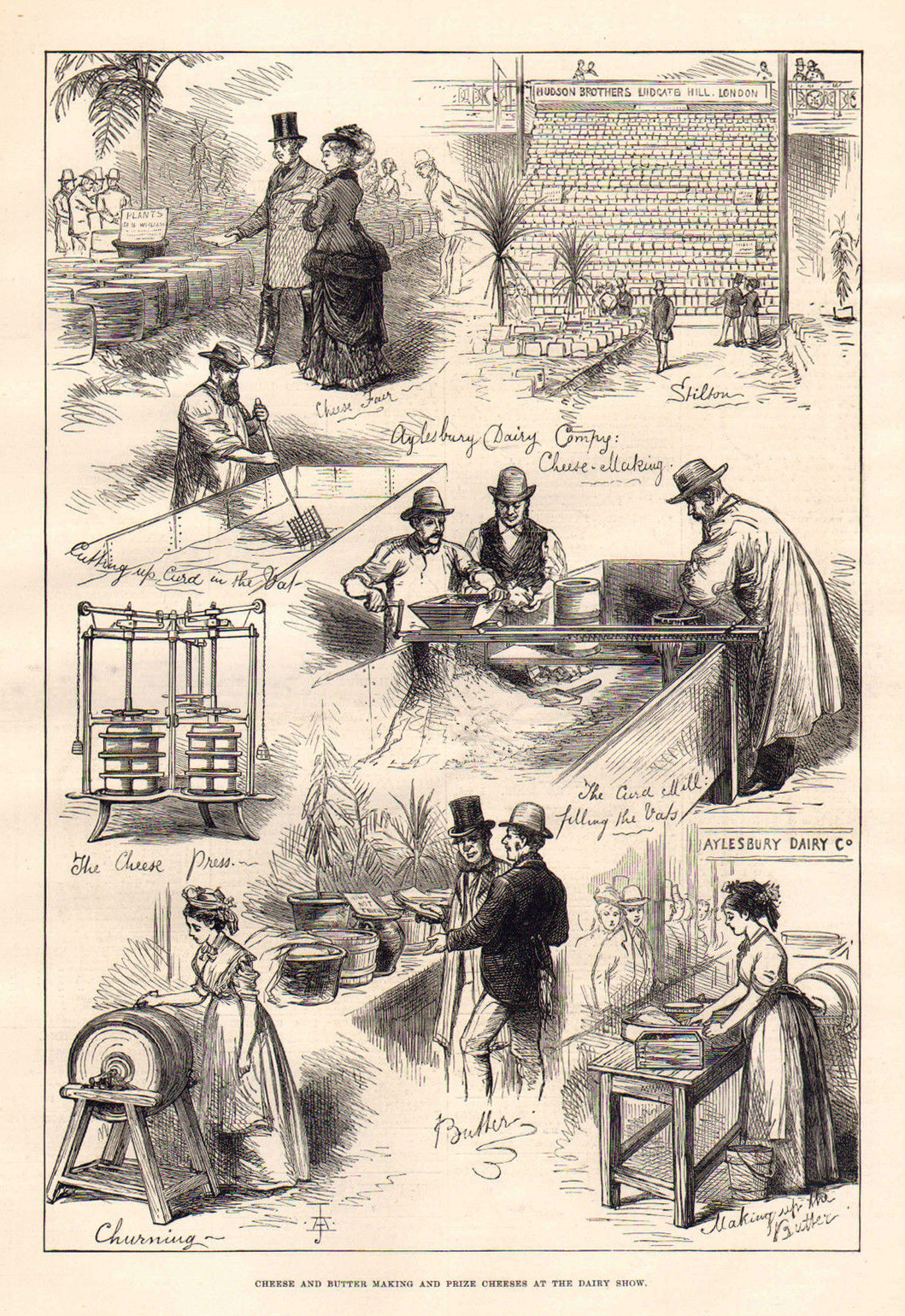
Cheese and Butter Making and Prize Cheeses at the Dairy Show; The Illustrated London News, 1876

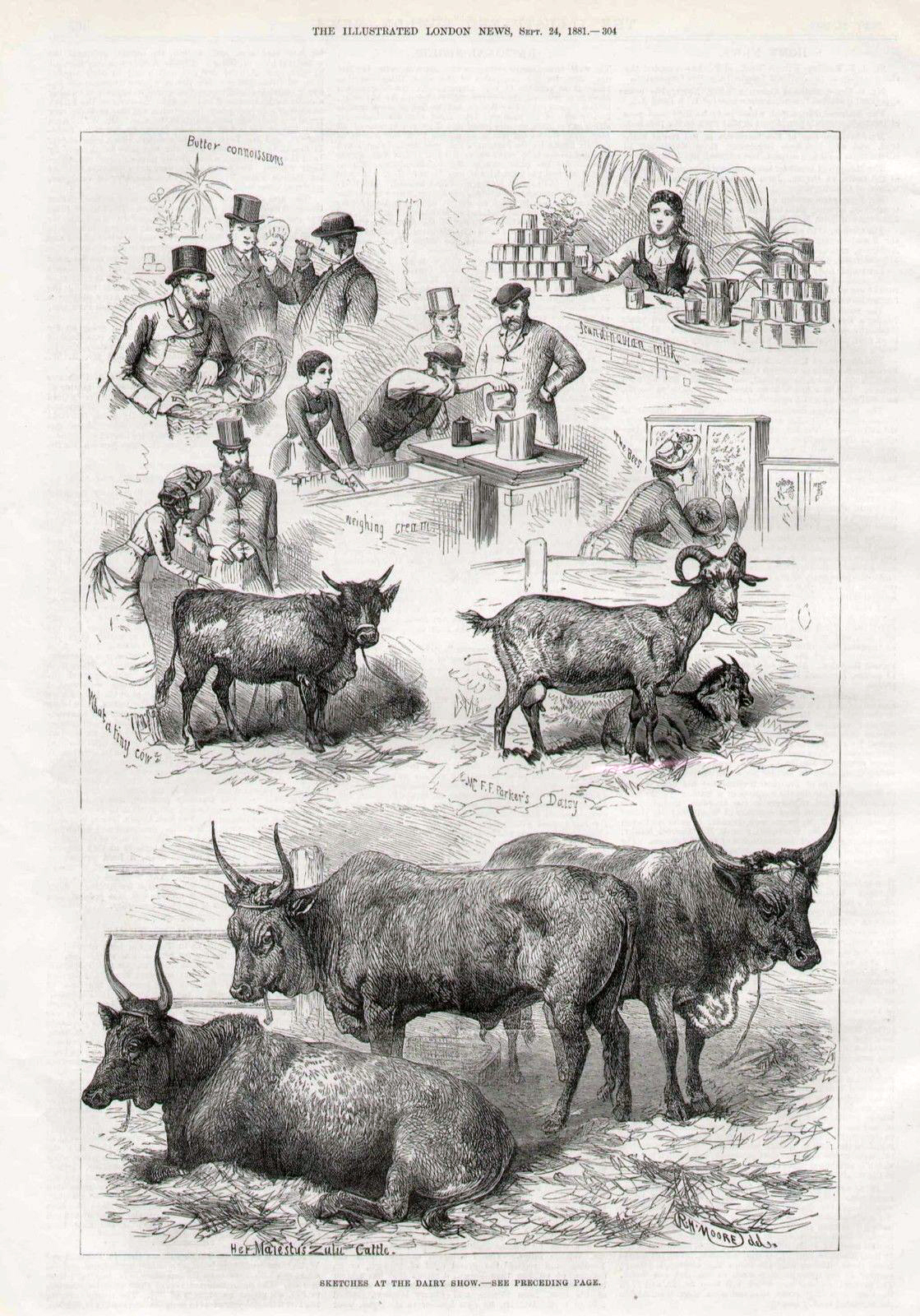
Sketches at the Dairy Show; The Illustrated London News, 1881

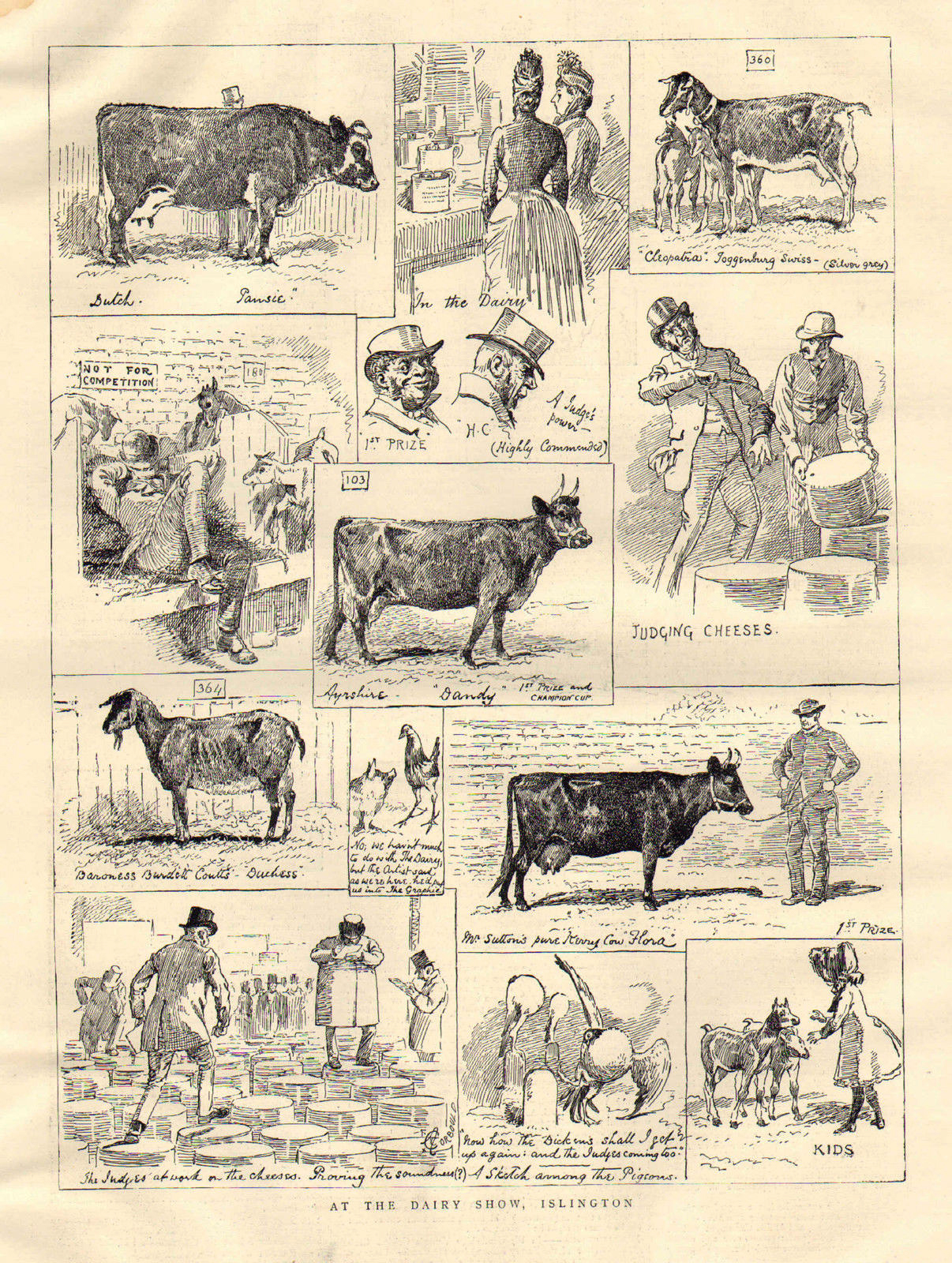
Cattle at the Dairy Show, Islington; The Graphic, 1887
