= Orpington duck =

British breed of duck

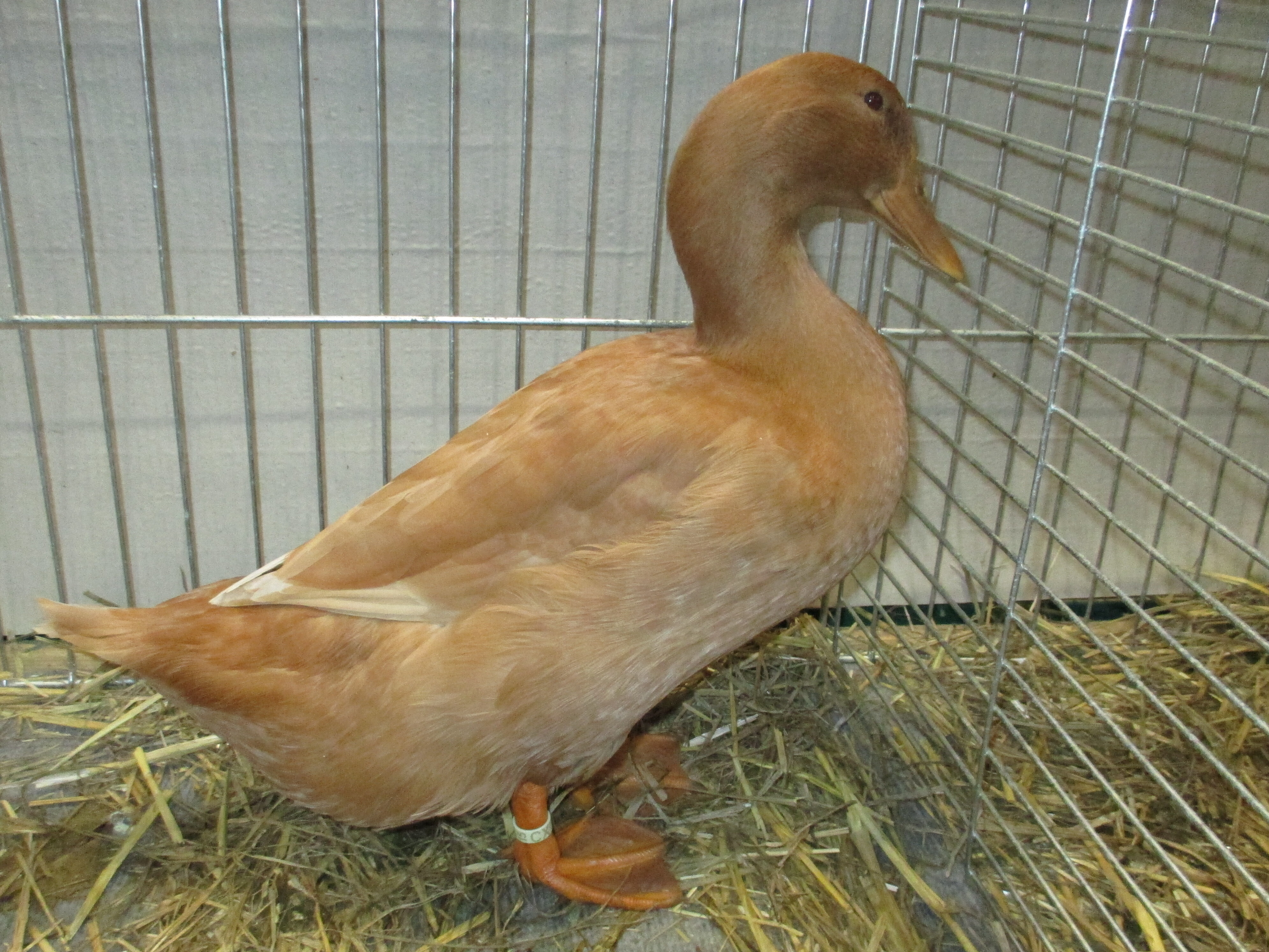
- A duck

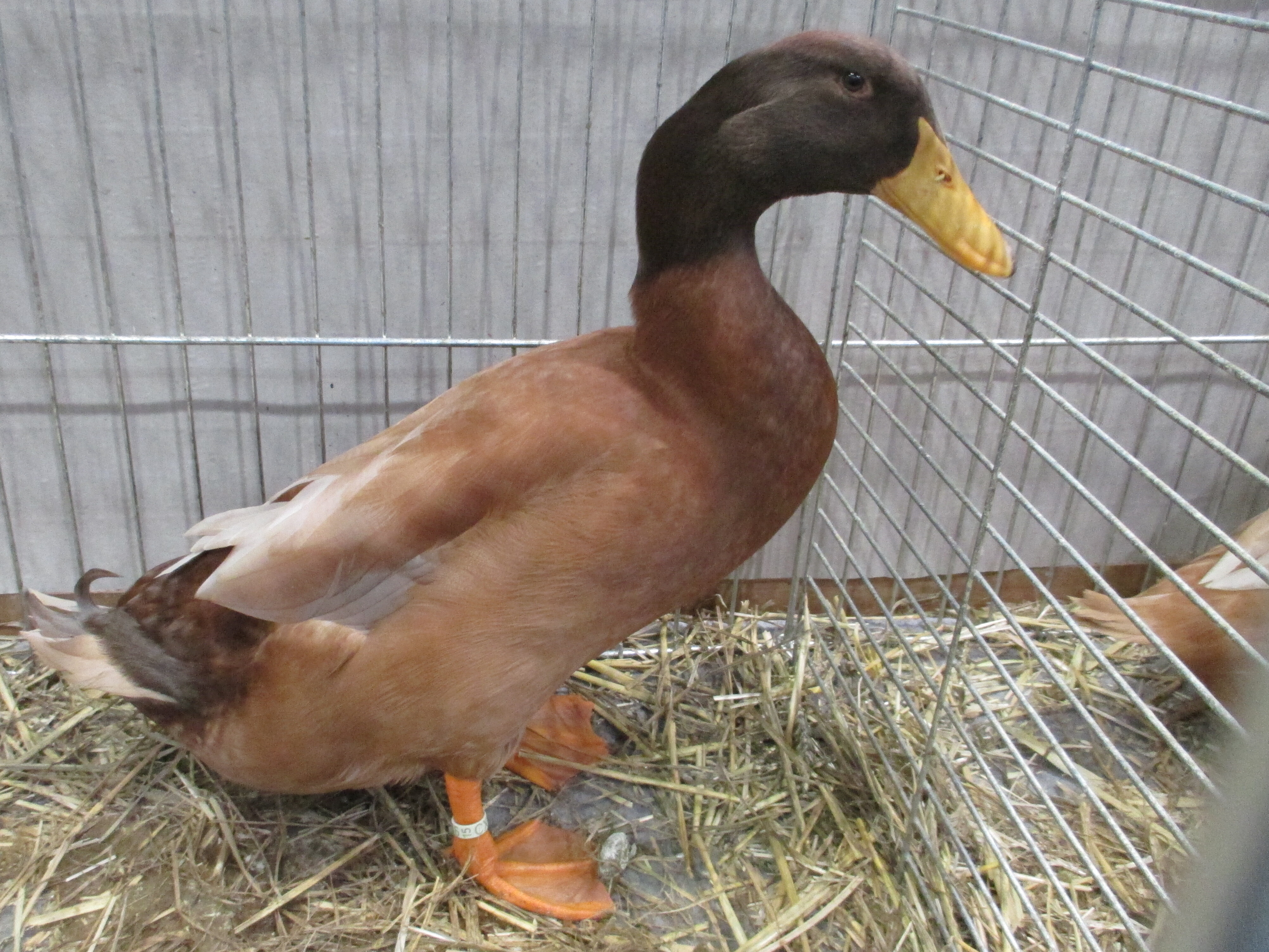
- A drake
- Conservation status: FAO (2007): not at risk; RBST (2026): priority; DAD-IS (2026): at risk
- Country of origin: United Kingdom
- Use: dual-purpose, meat and eggs

Traits
- Colour: buff; blond and brown also occur but are not standardised

Classification
- APA: medium
- EE: yes
- PCGB: light
- Duck; Anas platyrhynchos domesticus

The Orpington is a British breed of domestic duck. It was bred by the poultry farmer William Cook of Orpington, which at that time was in Kent in south-east England. Blue examples of the breed were shown in London in 1896, and buff birds in 1897. In the twenty-first century only the buff is a recognised breed, and so may also be known as the Buff Orpington.

It is a dual-purpose breed used for meat and egg production, and is capable of laying up to 220 eggs a year.

== History ==
The Orpington was bred by the poultry breeder William Cook at his farm at Orpington House, in St Mary Cray, near Orpington – which at that time was in Kent in south-east England. The first variety he bred was the blue, from cross-breeding of Aylesbury, Indian Runner and Rouen stock in approximately equal numbers. Examples were shown in October 1896 at the Dairy Show in the Agricultural Hall in Islington, in north London; Cook published pictures and a description in his Poultry Journal in the following month. He showed the buff variant at the Dairy Show in October 1897, and published details and images in his Poultry Journal the same month.

The breed standard for the buff variety was published in the revised edition of Wright's Book of Poultry in 1911; the blue variant was discussed, but no standard was included.

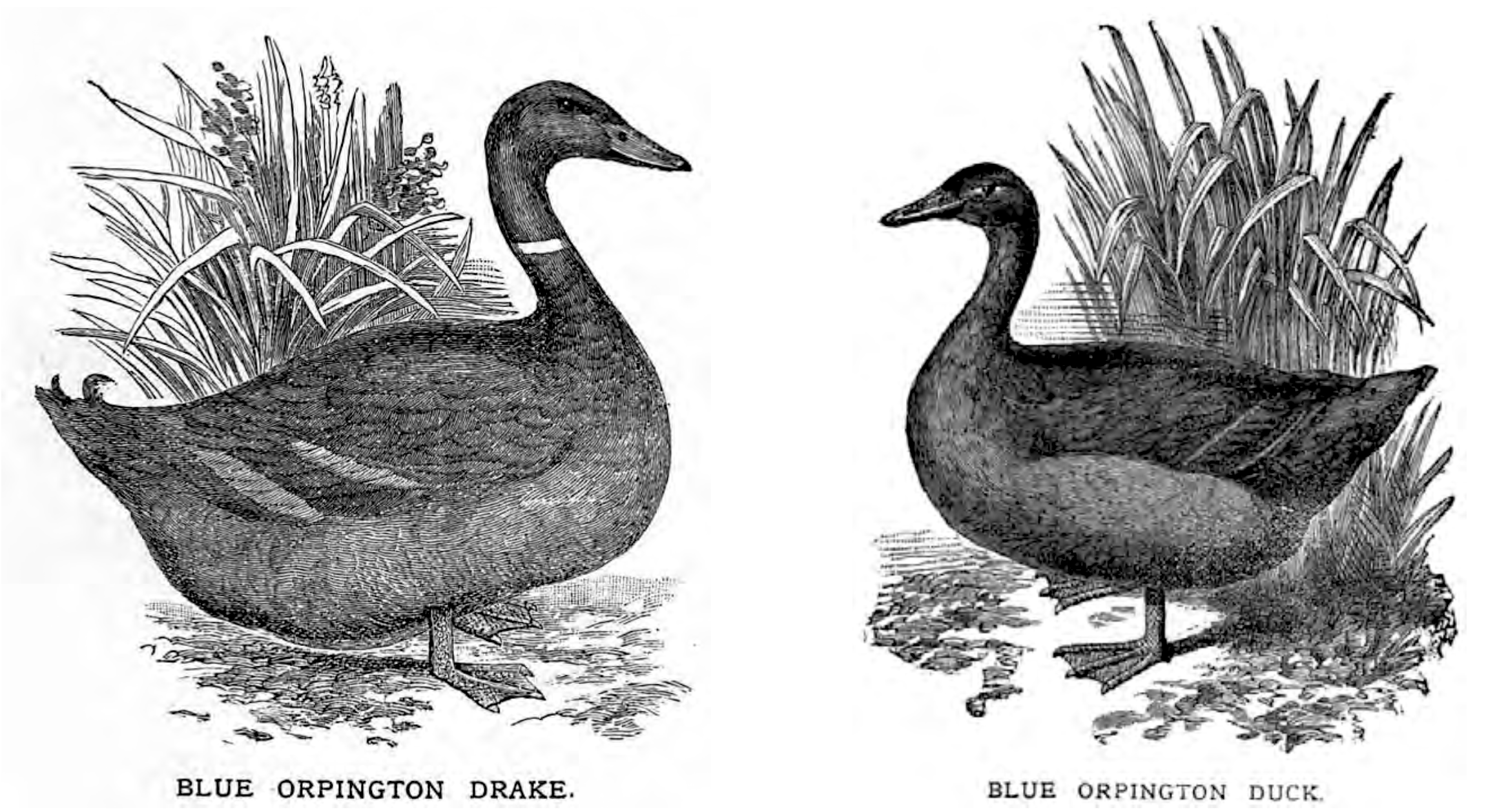
Blue Orpingtons, from William Cook's Poultry Journal, November 1896

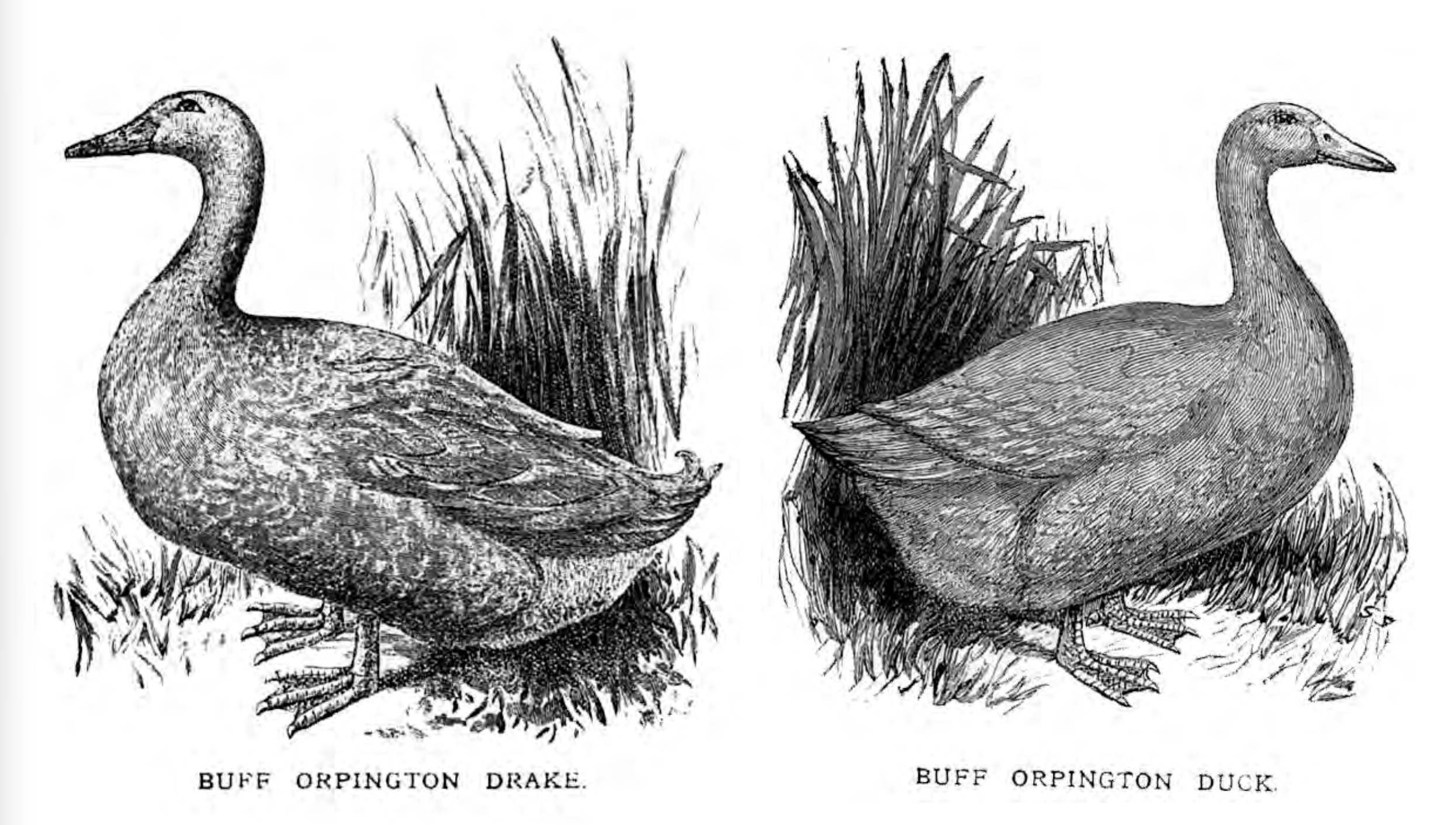
Buff Orpingtons, from William Cook's Poultry Journal, October 1897

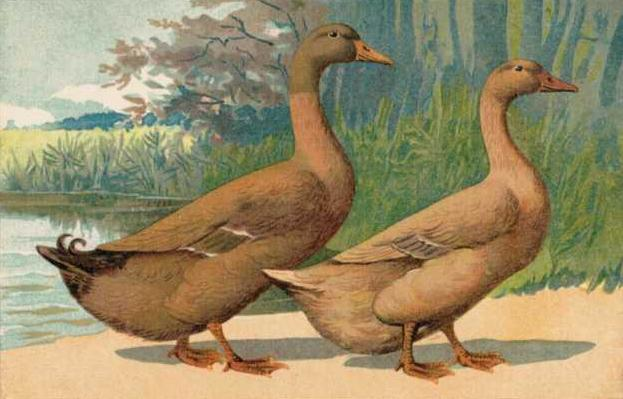
Drake and duck, lithograph, 1907

Cook showed a pair of buff Orpingtons at the Madison Square Garden Show in New York City in 1908. The breed was added to the Standard of Perfection of the American Poultry Association in 1914 as the Buff.

The Orpington is reported from four countries: Australia, Ireland, New Zealand and the United Kingdom. Its conservation status in the UK was listed as "priority" on the 2025–2026 watchlist of the Rare Breeds Survival Trust, and as "unknown" in the DAD-IS database of the Food and Agriculture Organization of the United Nations in 2026.

== Characteristics ==
The Orpington is classified as a light duck. Weights are 2.2–3.2 kg for ducks and 2.2–3.4 kg for drakes. For genetic reasons, it is seen in three colour varieties: buff, blond and brown; all three colour variations appear, but only the buff is described in the breed standard.

== Use ==
A productive duck may lay more than 220 eggs per year. Ducklings gain weight fairly rapidly, and may reach slaughter weight in eight or ten weeks.
