= Asil chicken =

Indian breed of chicken

Asil
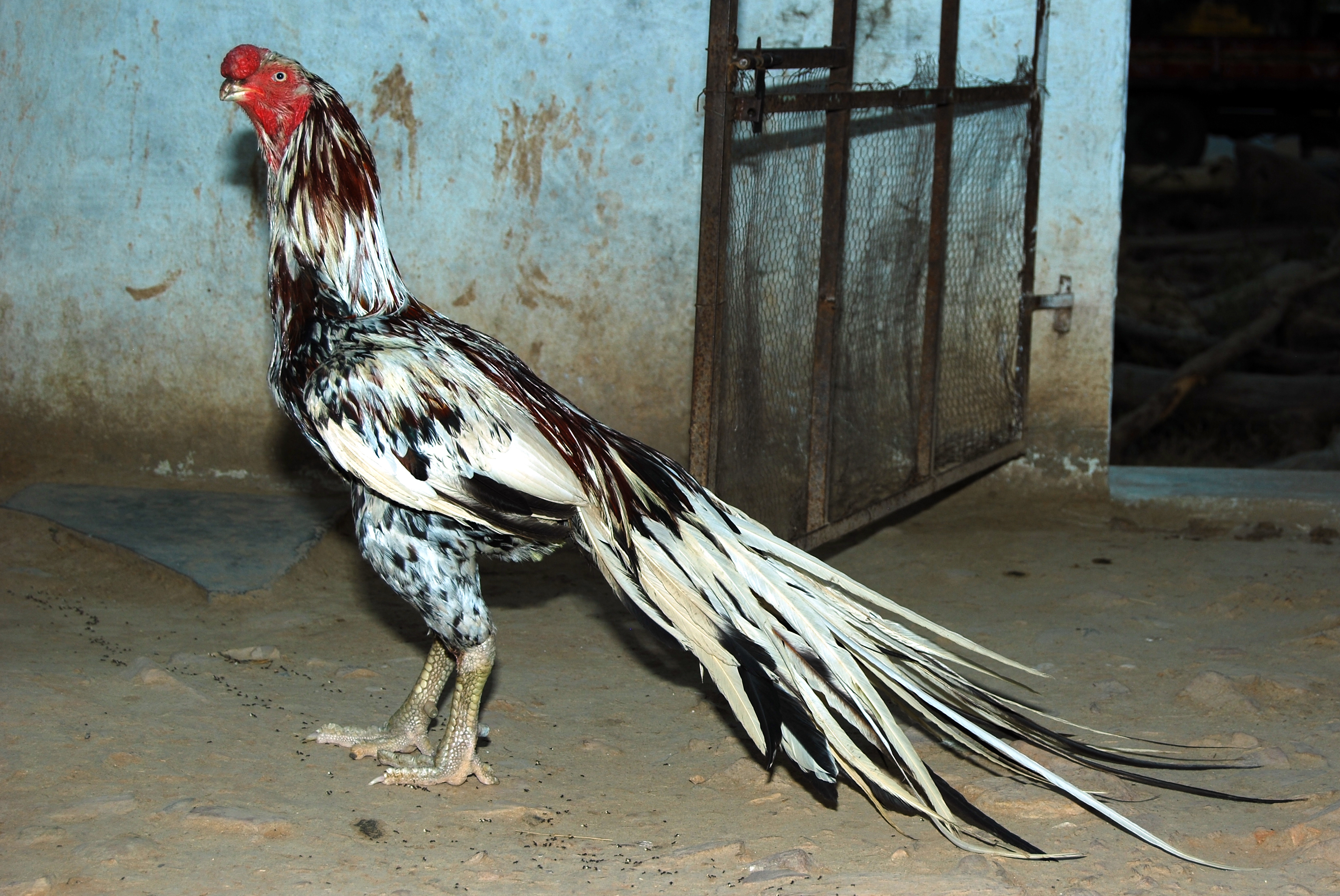
- Cock bird
- Conservation status: FAO (2007): not at risk; DAD-IS (2021): unknown; ICAR (2022): not at risk; Livestock Conservancy (2026): critical
- Other names: Aseel
- Country of origin: Indian subcontinent
- Distribution: international
- Use: cock-fighting; meat

Traits
- Weight: Male: Large: 4 kg; Reza: 1.80–2.70 kg; Bantam: 1100 g; Female: Large: 2.6 kg; Reza: 1.35–2.25 kg; Bantam: 900 g
- Egg colour: tinted, cream to brown

Classification
- APA: all other standard breeds
- EE: yes
- PCGB: Asian hard feather
- Chicken; Gallus gallus domesticus

The Asil or Aseel is an Indian breed or group of breeds of game chicken. It is distributed in much of India, particularly in the states of Andhra Pradesh, Chhattisgarh and Odisha; it has been exported to several other countries.

It is one of the parent breeds of the Indian Game, developed in the West Country of England in the early nineteenth century.

== History ==
The Asil originated in the Indian subcontinent, the area that includes modern India, Pakistan, Bangladesh and Sri Lanka; it is thought to be among the oldest breeds of fighting cock. The word "Asil" is from Arabic, and means "purebred". In India, it is a general term for all fighting breeds.

In India the Asil is distributed particularly in the Khammam district of Andhra Pradesh, in the Bastar and Dantiwara districts of Chhattisgarh, and in the Koraput and Malkanagiri districts of Odisha. It is also present in Bangladesh and Pakistan, which were part of British India until Partition, and is found in other countries including Australia, Guatemala, Honduras, Ireland, Luxembourg, the United Kingdom, the United States and Uruguay. Game fowl of this type were imported from about 1750 to Europe, where they gave rise to several modern breeds; in some countries, such as Germany and Holland, a larger variant of the Asil is treated as a separate breed, the Madras.

An Asil bantam was created in the late nineteenth century by the British breeder William Flamank Entwisle; it became popular in Britain and in Holland, but later died out. In the 1980s it was re-created in Belgium by Willy Coppens, using Shamo, Indian Game and Reza Asil; it is bred in Austria, Belgium, Germany, Holland, Hungary and the United Kingdom, in a variety of colours.

In 2005 the Asil was the only Indian breed of chicken not in need of conservation. In 2007 its global conservation status was listed by the Food and Agriculture Organization of the United Nations as 'not at risk'. In 2021 its status was listed in DAD-IS as 'unknown'; in 2022 the estimated total number of the birds was revised from 12000 to over 33 million, and the status changed to 'not at risk'. The National Bureau of Animal Genetic Resources of the Indian Council of Agricultural Research also listed it as 'not at risk' in 2022. In the United States it was listed by the Livestock Conservancy in 2026 as 'critical'.

== Characteristics ==
The breed is closely and scantily feathered, with little fluff; the comb is mainly of the pea type, though some varieties have a single or rose comb. A study of 313 birds from an Andhra Pradesh flock found multi-coloured plumage, predominantly dark brown, black and golden; 98% of the birds had red pea combs, 65% had yellow shanks and 98% had white skin. At 72 weeks, mean body weights were about 3.8 kg for cocks and 2.3 kg kg for hens.

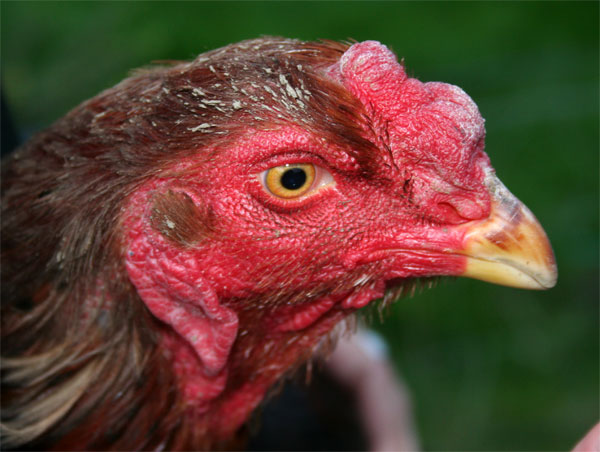
Head of a Kulang cock

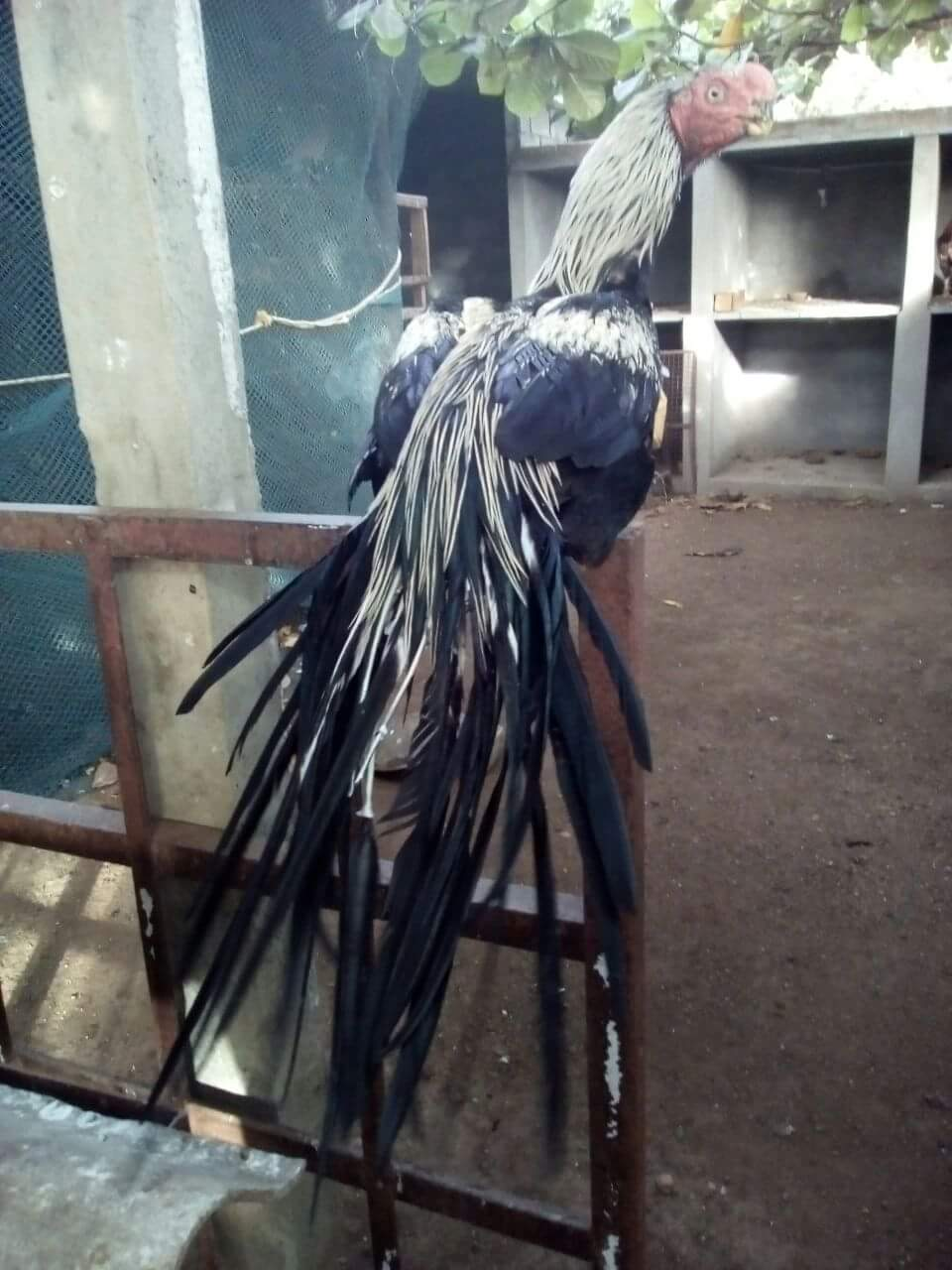
The long-tailed variety

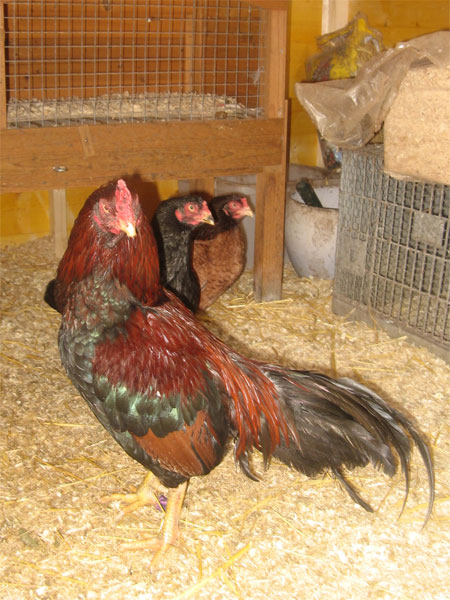
A Reza cock and hens

== Use ==
The Asil is kept for cock-fighting and meat. Hens are not good layers, but sit well. They may lay about 70 eggs per year; these vary in colour from cream-coloured to brownish, and weigh approximately 40 g.
