= Croad Langshan =

Chicken breed

Croad Langschan
- Conservation status: Dutty (United Kingdom)
- Country of origin: China
- Use: eggs, Show

Traits
- Weight: Male: 3.5–5 kg; Female: 2.5–3.5 kg
- Egg color: Brown
- Comb type: single

Classification
- APA: Feather legged
- PCGB: Soft feather: heavy
- Chicken; Gallus gallus domesticus

The Croad Langshan is an old, heavy, soft-feathered chicken breed which probably originated in China.

== Origin ==
The first recorded imports came from the Langshan ('Wolf Mountain') area in the outskirts of Nantong, just north of the lower reaches of the Yangtze River in China) in 1872 and were undertaken by Major F.T. Croad who imported the breed into Britain. Major Croad's niece, Miss A. C. Croad, has been credited with establishing the breed in Britain. The Croad Langshan Club was formed in Britain in 1904. The name ‘Croad’ distinguishes the original type of Langshan, imported by Major Croad, which were a utility fowl of great merit, from the tall Modern Langshans which have been developed for the show pen. As with many other breeds, numbers declined after the Second World War and eventually the breed was left without a breed club in the UK. It was rescued by the Rare Poultry Society until in 1979 the club was reformed.

Langshans were also imported to North America in 1878 and admitted to the standard in 1883. White Langshans were admitted to the standard ten years later in 1893. There are three varieties of Langshans that have been accepted to the US standard - Black, White, and Blue. The latter was not accepted to the standard until 1987.

In 1879 the breed was brought to Germany. The German Langshans were derived from these and soon replaced them. After the Second World War Croad Langshans were reintroduced to Germany from the USA.

The original Croad Langshans were black with a brilliant green sheen and that is still the main colour kept today.

== Characteristics ==
The Croad Langshan is large in body, has a deep and long breast which is carried well forward; the back is rather long and sloping with the tail rising sharply from the back, giving the characteristic 'U' shape. The head is small compared to the body size, the beak is light to dark horn in colour; the comb is medium-sized, single and carried upright in both sexes. The shanks and outer toes are slightly feathered. In the original birds the males topped 10 lb/4.5 kg; today cocks weigh 9.5 lbs/3.75-4.25 kg and hens 7.5 lbs/3-3.5 kg. Hatching eggs should weigh at least 58g.

In the early 20th century Croad Langshans became a popular utility breed, doing well in laying trials. The hens lay 140-150 eggs a year and are good winter layers; the eggs are dark brown with a plum-coloured bloom. The hens are excellent sitters and mothers. Croad Langshans are easily tamed and adapt well to both confinement and free range. They do well in sheltered conditions and dry soils but are not well suited to very exposed conditions. Under suitable conditions they thrive well and are very productive. Their flesh is fine in texture and of excellent quality.

The American Poultry Association recognises three colour varieties: black and white were recognised in 1883, and blue in 1987. Many other breeds were created using Langshan blood in the foundation matings. These include, for example, Barnevelders, Black Orpingtons, and Marans. Langshans still exist in China today.

== See also ==
- Australian Langshan
- German Langshan
- Modern Langshan
- List of chicken breeds
