= Old English Game =

British breed of domestic chicken

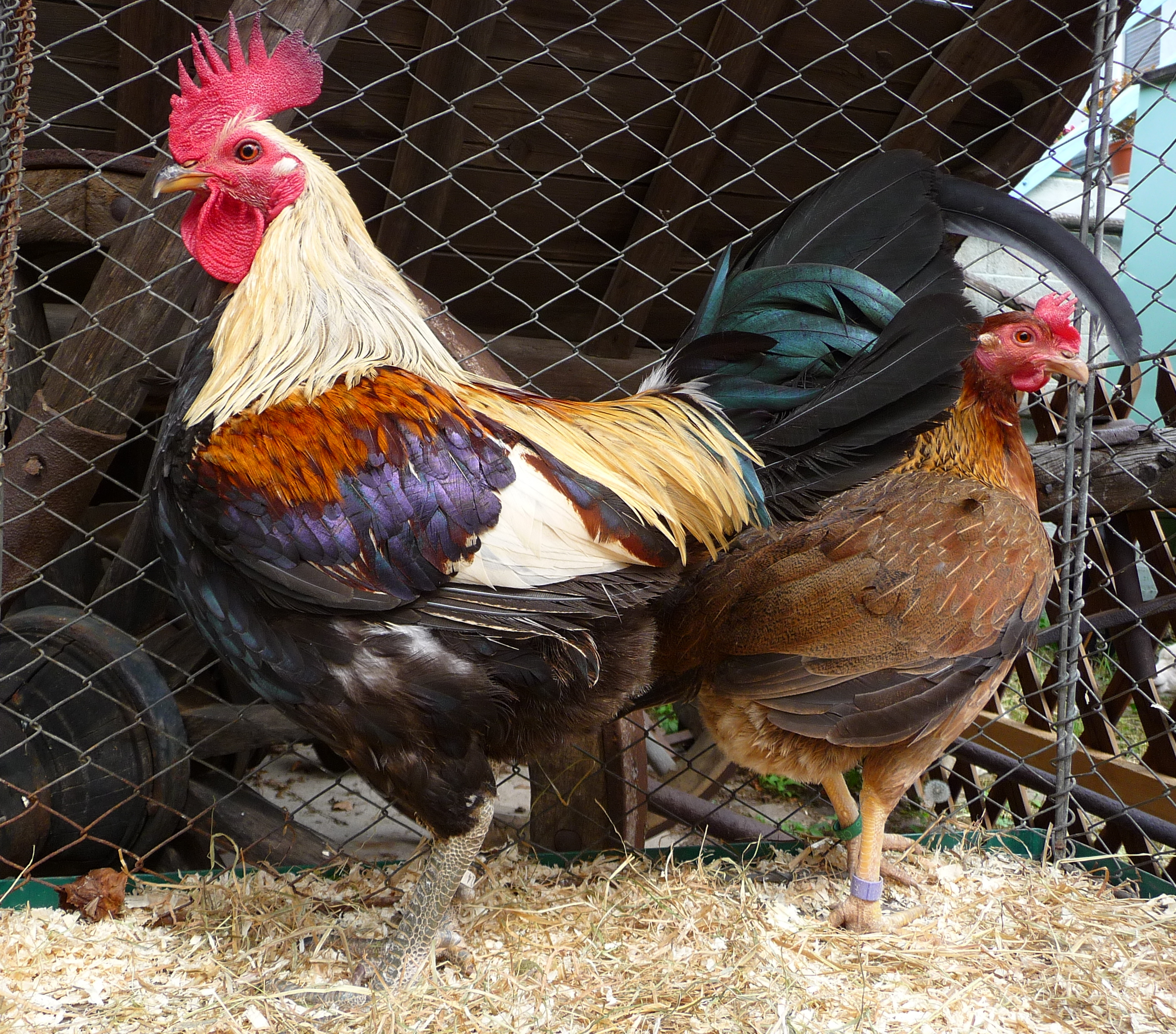
- Golden duckwing bantam cock and hen
- Conservation status: Breed association (2002): secure; FAO (2007): not at risk
- Country of origin: United Kingdom

Traits
- Weight: Male: Carlisle: up to 2.94 kg; Oxford: 1.8–2.5 kg; Bantam: 620–740 g; Female: Carlisle: up to 2.50 kg; Oxford: 0.9–1.36 kg; Bantam: 510–620 g
- Egg colour: white tinted
- Comb type: single

Classification
- APA: all other standard breeds
- EE: yes
- PCGB: hard feather
- Chicken; Gallus gallus domesticus

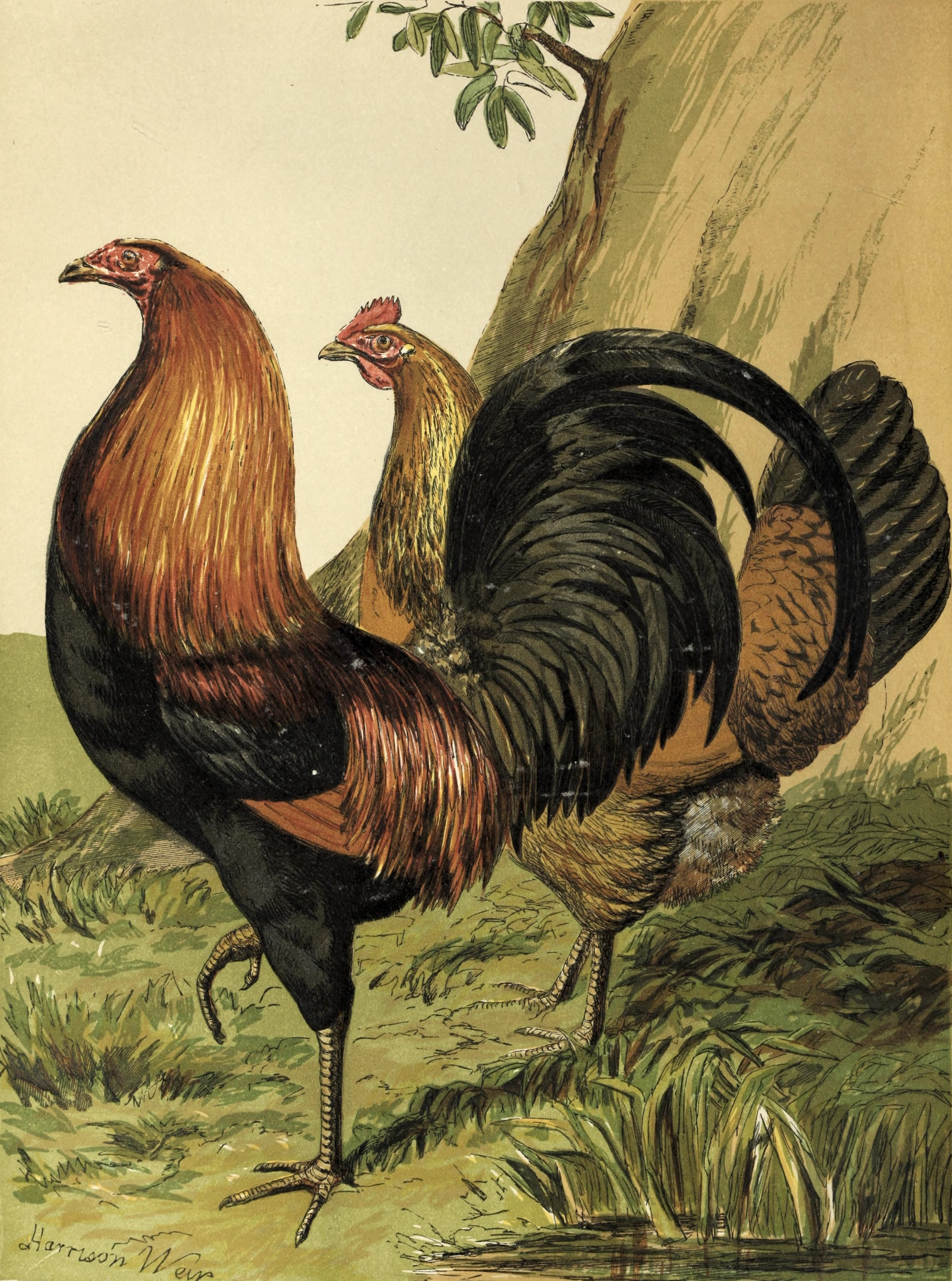
Black-breasted Red Game, illustration by Harrison Weir, 1867

The Old English Game is a British breed of domestic chicken. It was probably originally bred for cockfighting. Two different standards are recognised by the Poultry Club of Great Britain: the Carlisle Old English Game and the Oxford Old English Game. There is an Old English Game bantam.

== Characteristics ==
The Old English Game has many colour variants. In Britain, thirteen colours are recognised for the Carlisle type, and thirty for the Oxford type, while the Entente Européenne d’Aviculture et de Cuniculture lists thirty-three. Twenty-eight are recognised by the American Poultry Association,

== Use ==
Since the abolition of cock-fighting in 1849, the Old English Game has been kept primarily for show. Old English Game hens may lay about forty small tinted eggs in a year.
