= List of Spanish chicken breeds =

This is a list of some of the chicken breeds considered in Spain to be wholly or partly of Spanish origin. Some may have complex or obscure histories, so inclusion here does not necessarily imply that a breed is predominantly or exclusively Spanish.

Spanish name	English name if used	Image	Notes
Andaluza Azul	Blue Andalusian		
Cara Blanca	White-faced Black Spanish		
Castellana Negra			
Combatiente Español			
Empordanesa			Roja; Rossa
Enana Flor d’Ametller			not recognised
Euskal Oiloa			Beltza; Gorria; Lepasoila; Marraduna; Zilarra
Extremeña Azul			
Galiña de Mos			
Gallina del Prat	Catalana		
Gallina del Sobrarbe			
Gallina Ibicenca			
Indio de León			
Mallorquina			
Menorquina	Minorca		
Murciana			
Pardo de León			
Pedresa			
Penedesenca			Aperdizada; Barrada; Negra; Trigueña
Pintarazada			
Pita Pinta			
Pitiüsa			
Utrerana			
Valenciana de Chulilla			
