= Plymouth Rock chicken =

American breed of chicken

Plymouth Rock
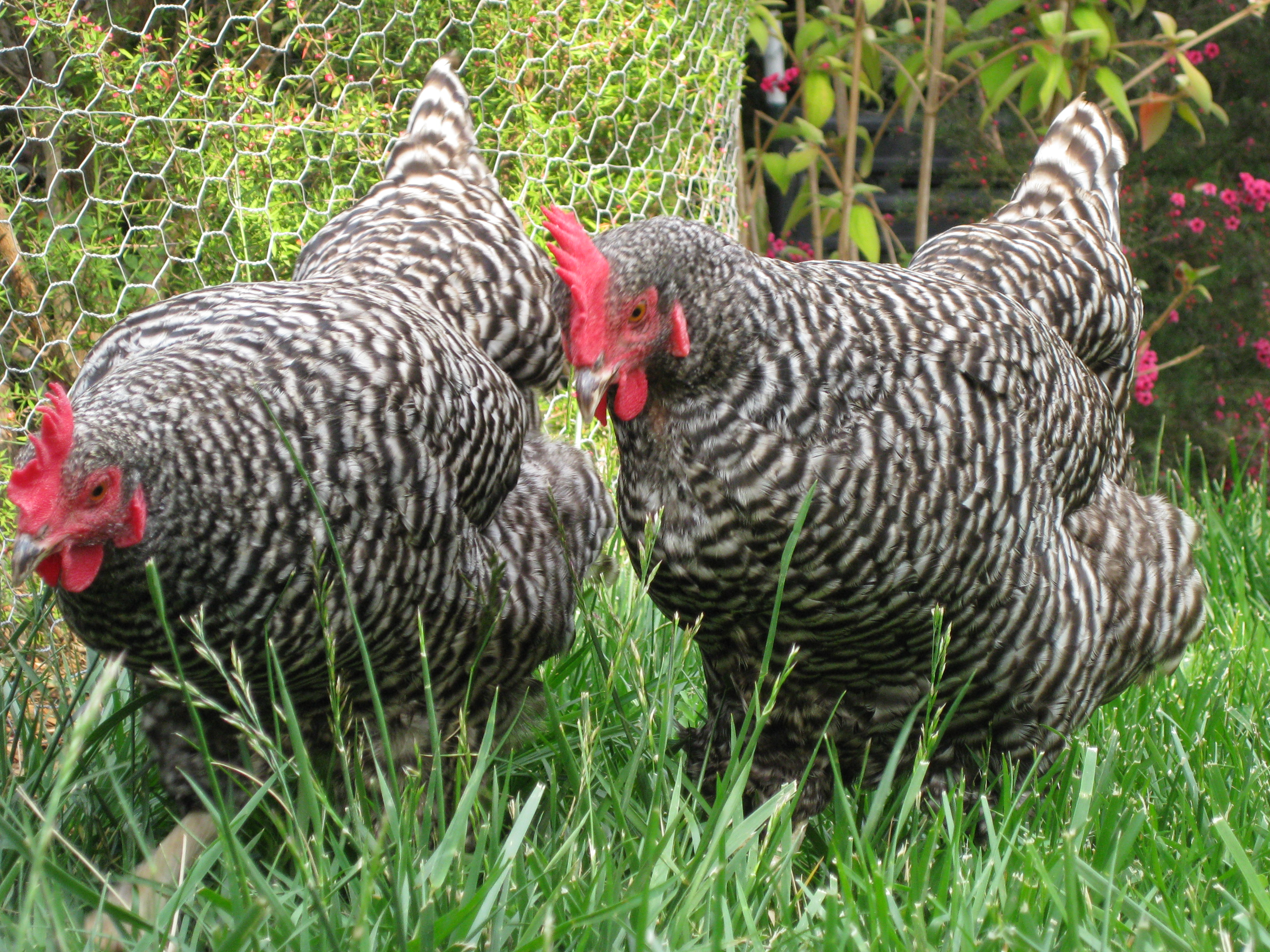
- Hens, barred plumage
- Conservation status: Recovering
- Other names: Rock; Barred Rock
- Country of origin: United States
- Standard: American Poultry Association
- Use: dual-purpose breed

Traits
- Weight: Male: Standard: minimum 3.4 kg (7.5 lb); Bantam: maximum 1.4 kg (3 lb); Female: Standard: minimum 2.9 kg (6.5 lb); Bantam: maximum 1.1 kg (2.5 lb)
- Skin color: yellow
- Egg color: brown
- Comb type: single

Classification
- APA: American
- ABA: single comb clean legged
- EE: yes
- PCGB: soft feather: heavy
- APS: heavy breed softfeather
- Chicken; Gallus gallus domesticus

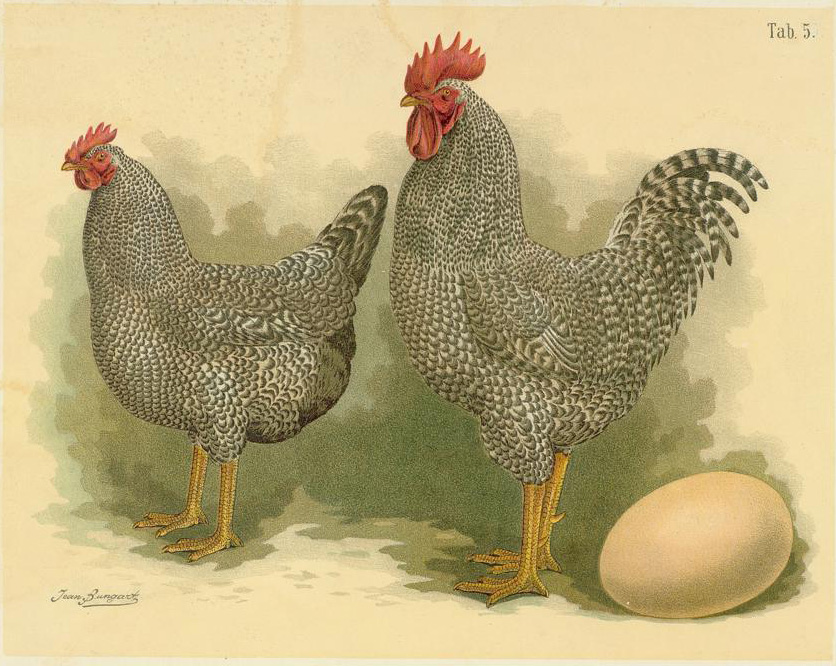
Barred cock and hen, illustration from Jean Bungartz, Geflügel-Album, 1885

The Plymouth Rock is an American breed of domestic chicken. It was first seen in Massachusetts in the nineteenth century and for much of the early twentieth century was the most widely kept chicken breed in the United States. It is a dual-purpose bird, raised both for its meat and for its brown eggs. It is resistant to cold, easy to manage, and a good sitter.

== History ==
The Plymouth Rock was first shown in Boston in 1849, but was then not seen for another twenty years. In 1869, in Worcester, Massachusetts, one D.A. Upham cross-bred some Black Java hens with a cock with barred plumage and a single comb; he selectively bred for barred plumage and clean (featherless) legs. His birds were shown in Worcester in 1869; the modern Plymouth Rock is thought to derive from them. Other people have been associated with the development of the Plymouth Rock, as have other chicken breeds including the Brahma, the Cochin (both white and buff), the Dominique and the White-faced Black Spanish. According to the Livestock Conservancy, it may have originated from cross-breeding of Java birds with single-combed Dominiques; or, based on genomic analysis, principally from the Dominique, with substantial contribution from the Java and Cochin and some input from other breeds.

The Plymouth Rock was included in the first edition of the American Standard of Perfection of the new American Poultry Association in 1874. The barred plumage pattern was the original one; other colors were later added.

It became the most widespread chicken breed in the United States and remained so until about the time of World War II. With the advent of industrial chicken farming, it was much used in the development of broiler hybrids but began to fall in popularity as a domestic fowl.

In 2023 the Plymouth Rock was listed by the Livestock Conservancy as 'recovering', meaning that there were at least 2500 new registrations per year. The estimated population worldwide for the Plymouth Rock was reported in 2026 at almost 24500; about 800 were reported for the barred Plymouth Rock and just under 1200 for the white variety.

== Characteristics ==
The Plymouth Rock is easy to manage, is early-feathering, has good resistance to cold and is a good sitter. It has a single comb with five points; the comb, wattles and ear-lobes are bright red. The legs are yellow and unfeathered. The beak is yellow or horn-colored. The back is long and broad, and the breast fairly deep.

In the United States, seven color varieties of the Plymouth Rock are recognized: barred, blue, buff, Columbian, partridge, silver-penciled and white. Ten plumage varieties are listed by the Entente Européenne d'Aviculture et de Cuniculture, of which five – the barred, black, buff, Columbian and white – are recognized by the Poultry Club of Great Britain. In Australia, the barred variant is split into two separate colors, dark barred and light barred.

== Use ==
The Plymouth Rock is a dual-purpose breed and is kept both for its meat and for its large brown eggs, of which it lays about 200 per year. The eggs weigh about 55 g (2 oz).

In industrial agriculture, crosses of suitable strains of white Plymouth Rock with industrial strains of white Cornish constitute the principal stock of American broiler production.

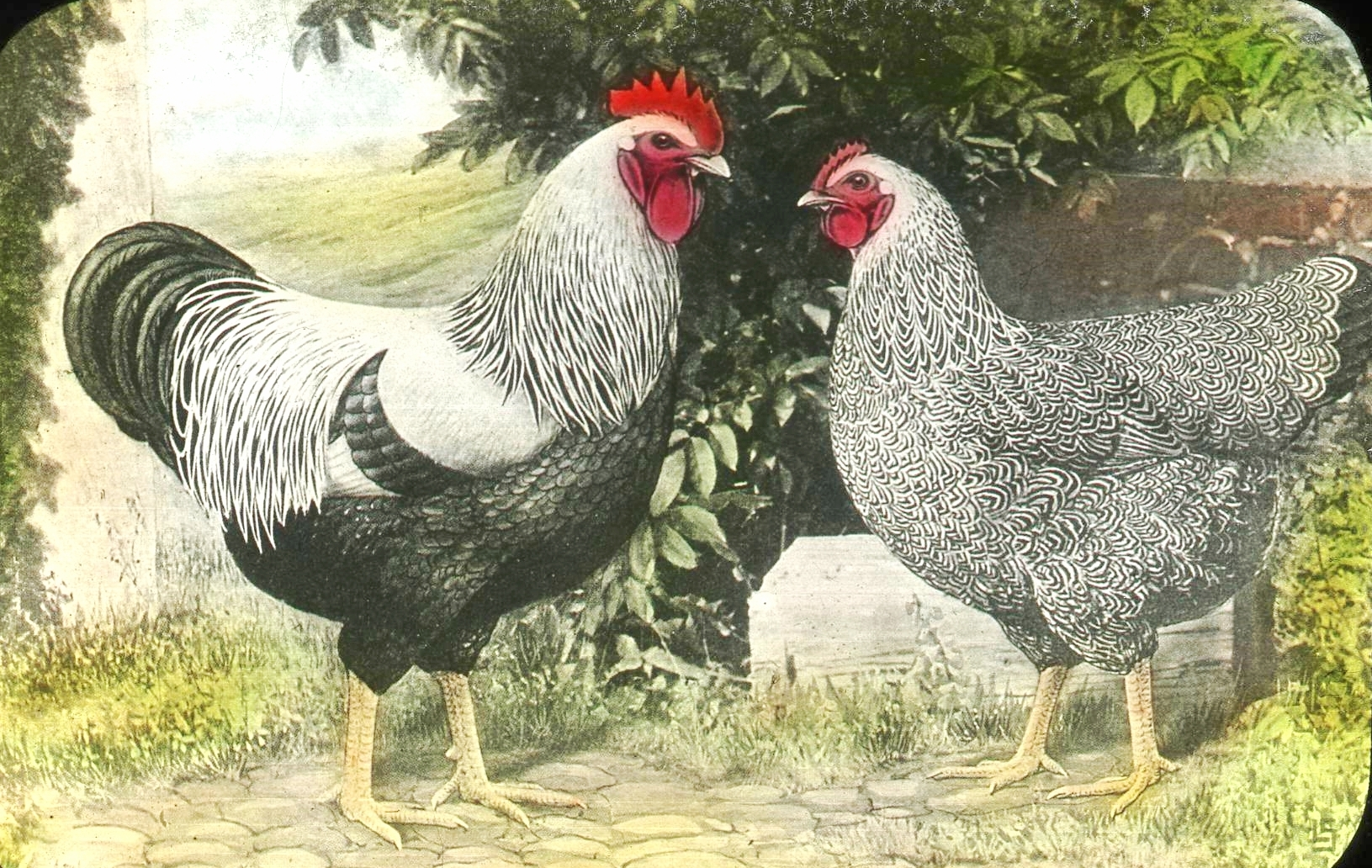
Silver-penciled cock and hen

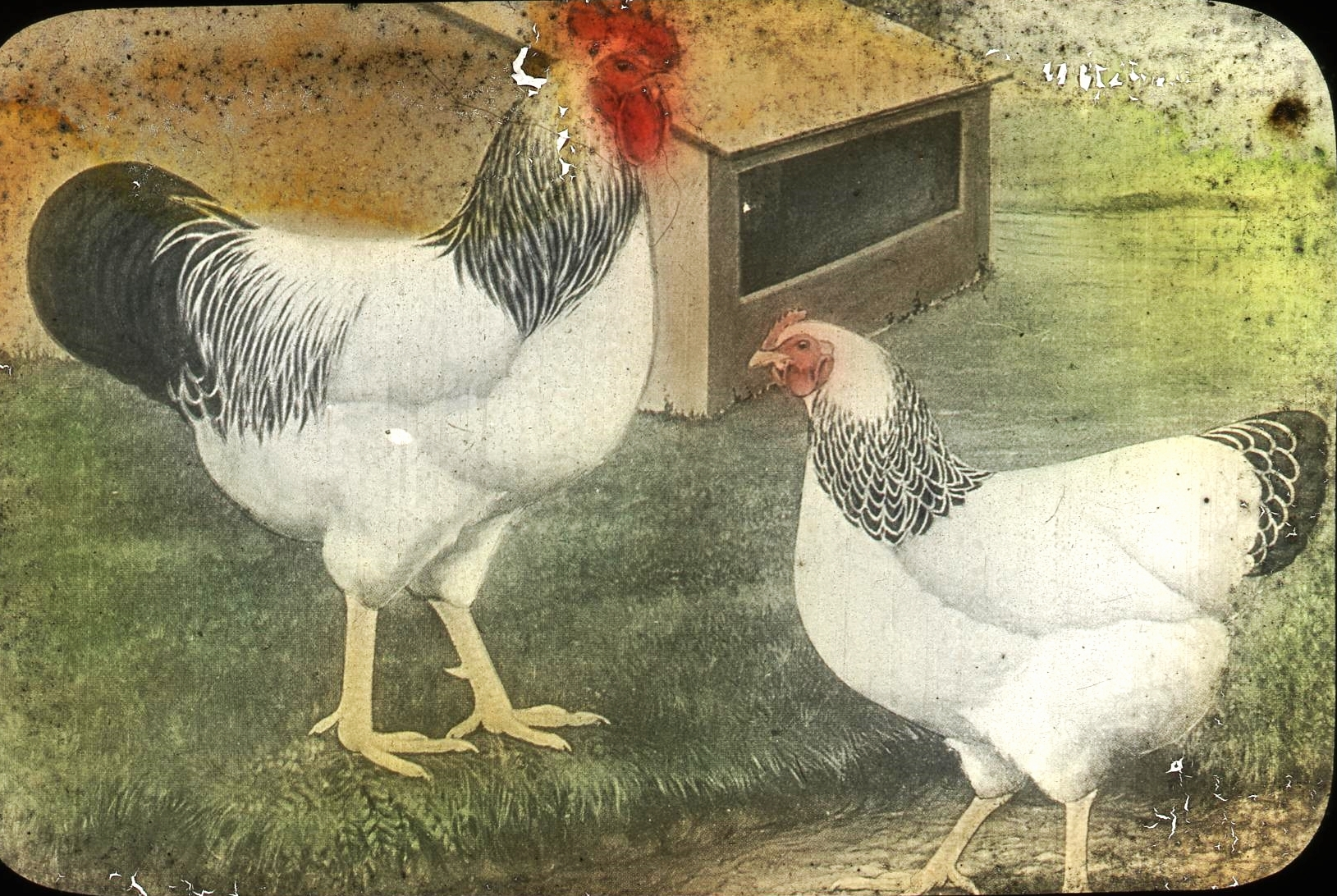
Columbian cock and hen

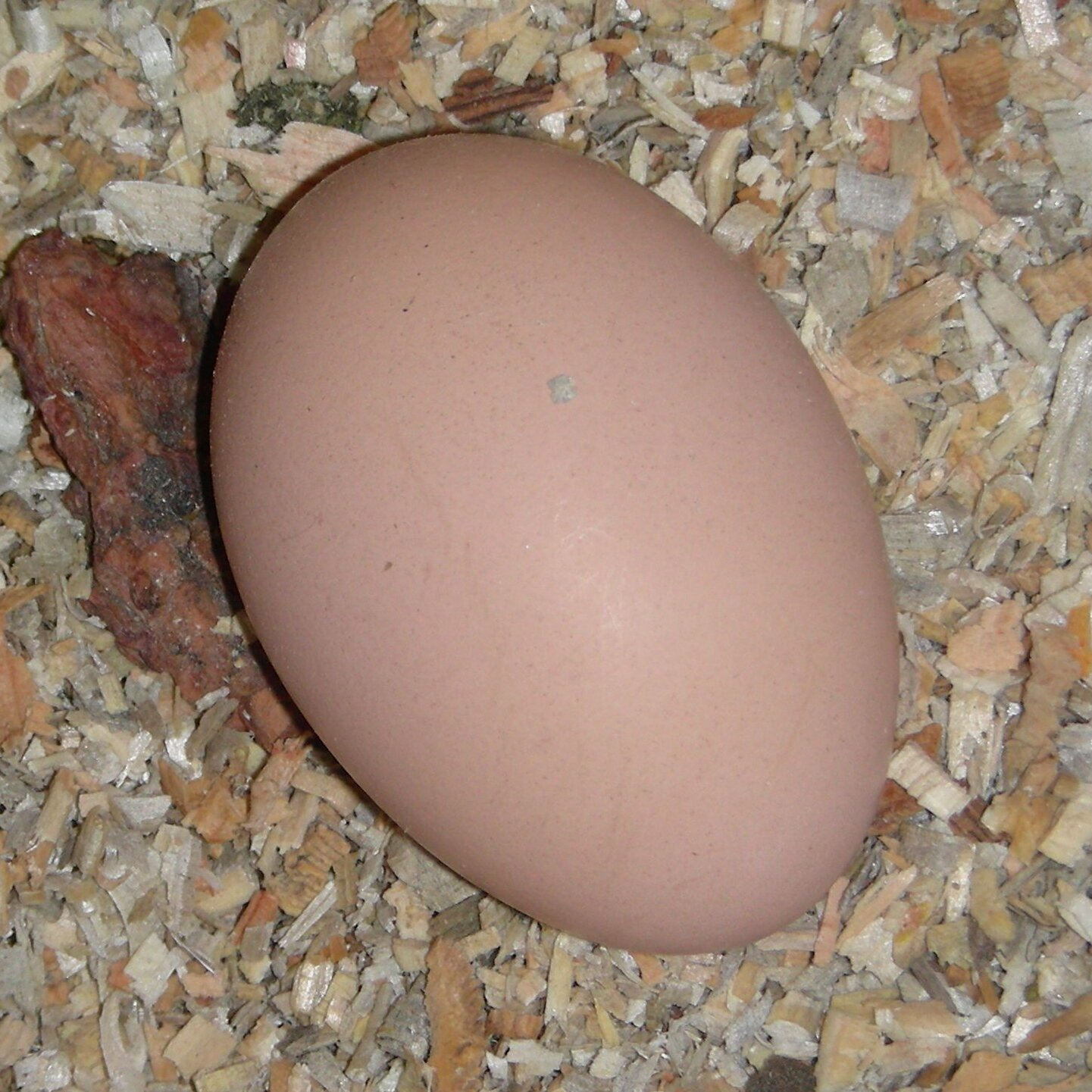
Egg
