= Pseudolinkage =

In genetics, pseudolinkage is a characteristic of a heterozygote for a reciprocal translocation, in which genes located near the translocation breakpoint behave as if they are linked even though they originated on nonhomologous chromosomes.

Linkage is the proximity of two or more markers on a chromosome; the closer together the markers are, the lower the probability that they will be separated by recombination. Genes are said to be linked when the frequency of parental type progeny exceeds that of recombinant progeny.

== Not occur in translocation homozygote ==
During meiosis in a translocation homozygote, chromosomes segregate normally according to Mendelian principles. Even though the genes have been rearranged during crossover, both haploid sets of chromosomes in the individual have the same rearrangement. As a result, all chromosomes will find a single partner with which to pair at meiosis, and there will be no deleterious consequences for the progeny.

== In translocation heterozygote ==
In translocation heterozygote, however, certain patterns of chromosome segregation during meiosis produce genetically unbalanced gametes that at fertilization become deleterious to the zygote. In a translocation heterozygote, the two haploid sets of chromosomes do not carry the same arrangement of genetic information. As a result, during prophase of the first meiotic division, the translocated chromosomes and their normal homologs assume a crosslike configuration in which four chromosomes, rather than the normal two, pair to achieve a maximum of synapsis between similar regions. We denote the chromosomes carrying translocated material with a T and the chromosomes with a normal order of genes with an N. Chromosomes N1 and T1 have homologous centromeres found in wild type on chromosome 1; N2 and T2 have centromeres found in wild type on chromosome 2. During anaphase of meiosis I, the mechanisms that attach the spindle to the chromosomes in this crosslike configuration still usually ensure the disjunction of homologous centromeres, bringing homologous chromosomes to opposite spindle poles. Depending on the arrangement of the four chromosomes on the metaphase plate, this normal disjunction of homologous produces one of two equally likely patterns of segregation.

=== Alternate segregation pattern ===
In the alternate segregation pattern, the two translocation chromosomes (T1 and T2) go to one pole, while the two normal chromosomes (N1 and N2) move to the opposite pole. Both kinds of gametes resulting from this segregation (T1, T2, and N1, N2) carry the correct haploid number of genes; and the zygotes formed by union of these gametes with normal gamete will be viable.

=== Adjacent-1 segregation pattern ===
In the adjacent-1 segregation pattern, homologous centromeres disjoin so that T1 and N2 go to one pole, while the N1 and T2 go to the opposite pole. Consequently, each gamete contains a large duplication (of the region found in both the normal and the translocated chromosome in that gamete) and a correspondingly large deletion (of the region found in neither of the chromosomes in that gametes), which make them genetically unbalanced. Zygotes formed by union of these gametes with a normal gametes are usually not viable.

=== Adjacent-2 segregation pattern ===
Because of the unusual cruciform pairing configuration in translocation heterozygotes, nondisjunction of homologous centromeres occurs at a measurable but low rate. This nondisjunction produces an adjacent-2 segregation pattern in which the homologous centromeres N1 and T1 go to the same spindle pole while the homologous centromeres N2 and T2 go to the other spindle pole. The resulting genetic imbalances are lethal after fertilization to the zygotes containing them.

Thus, in a translocation heterozygote, only the alternate segregation pattern yields viable progeny in outcrosses, the equally likely adjacent-1 pattern and the rare adjacent-2 pattern do not. Because of this, genes near the translocation breakpoints on the nonhomologous chromosomes participating in a reciprocal translocation exhibit pseudolinkage: They behave as if they are linked.
