= Euskal Oiloa =

Spanish breed of chicken

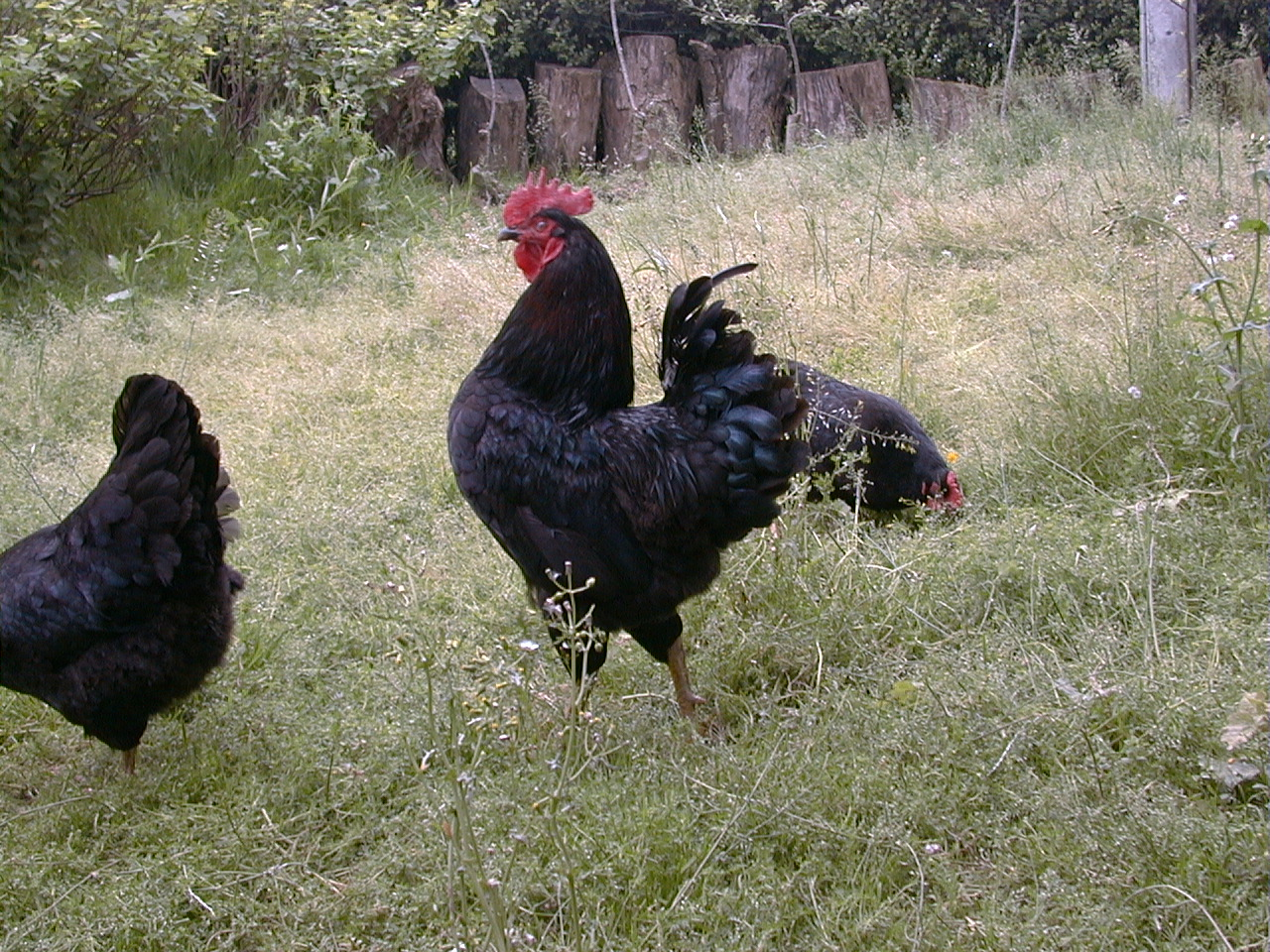
- The Beltza variety
- Other names: Spanish: Gallina Vasca
- Country of origin: Spain
- Standard: MAGRAMA (in Spanish)

Traits
- Weight: Male: 3.6 kg; Female: 2.5 kg
- Egg color: brown
- Comb type: single

Classification
- APA: no
- EE: France, Spain
- PCGB: no

Notes
- yellow legs, red earlobes
- Chicken; Gallus gallus domesticus

The Euskal Oiloa, Spanish: Gallina Vasca, is a breed of domestic chicken from the autonomous community of the Basque Country in north-eastern Spain and south-western France. It is the traditional rural chicken of the area, a rustic dual-purpose breed of Atlantic type, and differs from Mediterranean Spanish breeds such as the Castellana Negra and the Minorca in several respects: it has yellow legs and feet, red earlobes, and lays brown eggs.

== History ==
The Euskal Oiloa is the traditional chicken of the Basque rural economy. It was distributed throughout the historical territories of Araba, Bizkaia and Gipuzkoa, and gave both meat and brown eggs. In the twentieth century it was at first not threatened by imported commercial hybrid layer chickens and the spread of highly intensive chicken farming methods, as breeds such as the Leghorn laid white eggs, while Basque consumers preferred brown. Later, when brown-egg commercial hybrids appeared, they began to displace the traditional breed in many households.

Selective breeding of the Euskal Oiloa was begun in 1975 as part of the conservation programme for indigenous chicken breeds of the Instituto Nacional de Investigación y Tecnología Agraria y Alimentaria, the national public agrarian research institute. The decision to seek official breed status for these birds was taken at that time. A breed association, the Asociación de Criadores de Razas Aviares Vascas or EOALAK, was founded in 2006.

The breed standard of the Euskal Oiloa was officially approved on 15 March 2001. It is included in the official list of indigenous Spanish breeds in the royal decree of 26 December 2008, which established the national livestock breed conservation programme, where it is listed among the indigenous breeds at risk of extinction. At the end of 2013 a population of 10,872 birds was reported, all from the País Vasco.

== Characteristics ==
The Euskal Oiloa is a medium-heavy breed: cocks weigh about 3.6 kg, hens about 2.5 kg. The comb is single, with five to seven well-defined points. The comb, face, wattles and earlobes are red; the earlobes are narrow and pointed. The beak is curved in the cock, less so in the hen. The legs, feet and skin are yellow.

Five colour varieties are recognized: Beltza (black), Gorria (red), Lepasoila (naked-necked, red-brown), Marraduna (golden cuckoo) and Zilarra (black-tailed white). The Lepasoila, like other naked-necked chickens, has red skin on the neck.

== Use ==
Euskal Oiloa hens lay 209–220 brown eggs weighing about 60 g per year. Much of the meat production is in the form of capons; chemical castration is not used. In 2008 the Euskal Oiloa was added to the Slow Food Ark of Taste.

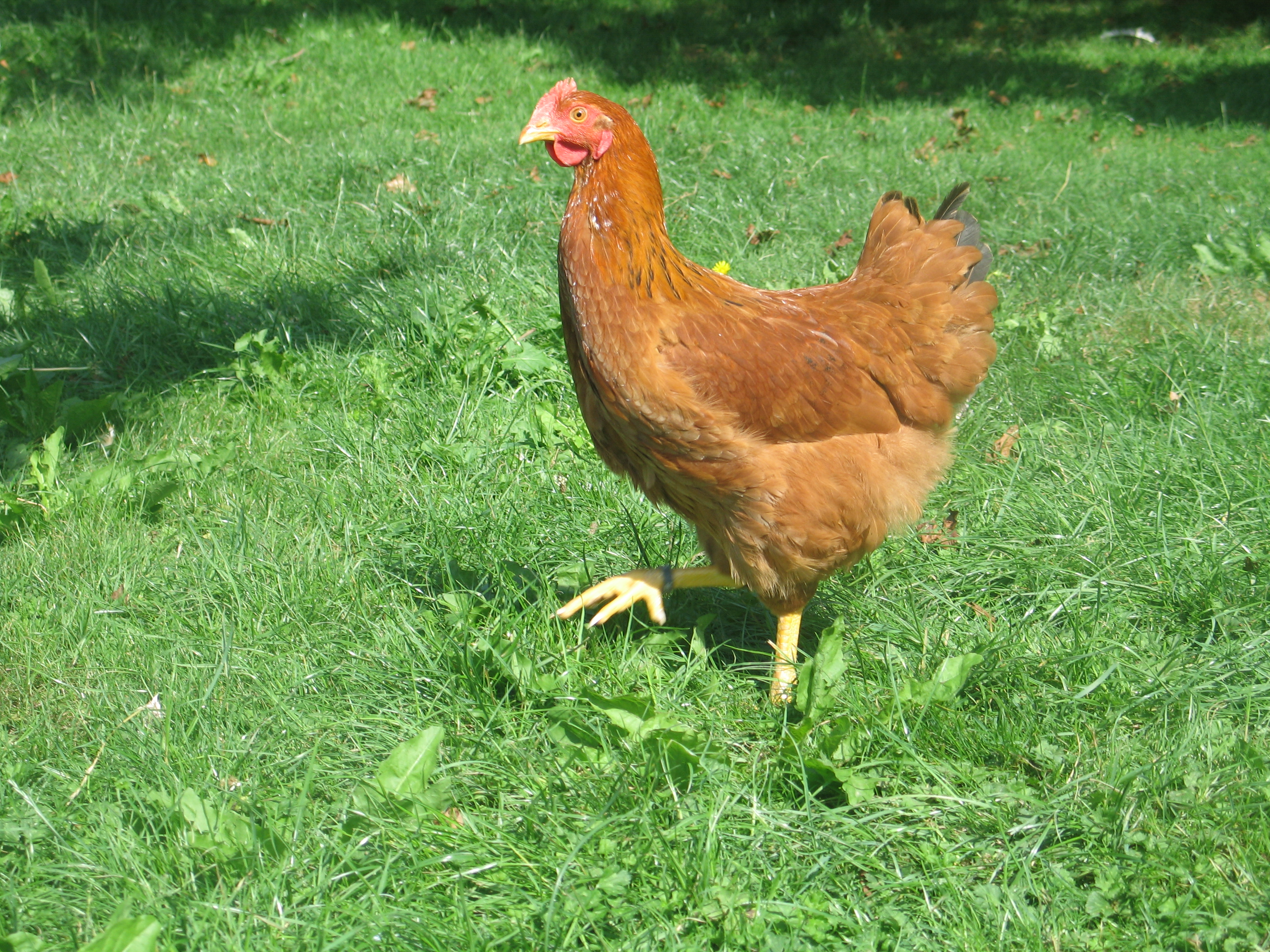
The Gorria variety

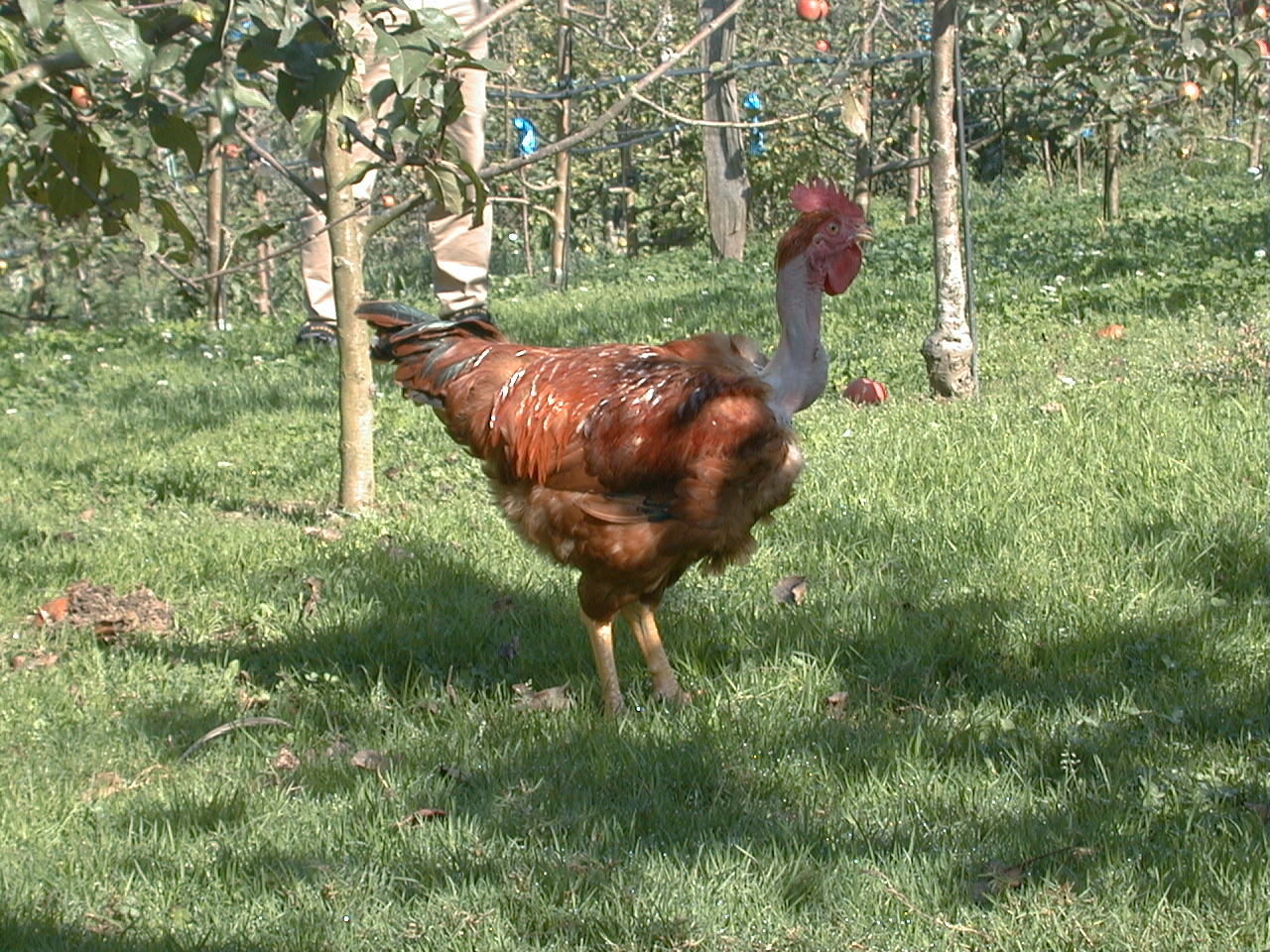
The Lepasoila variety

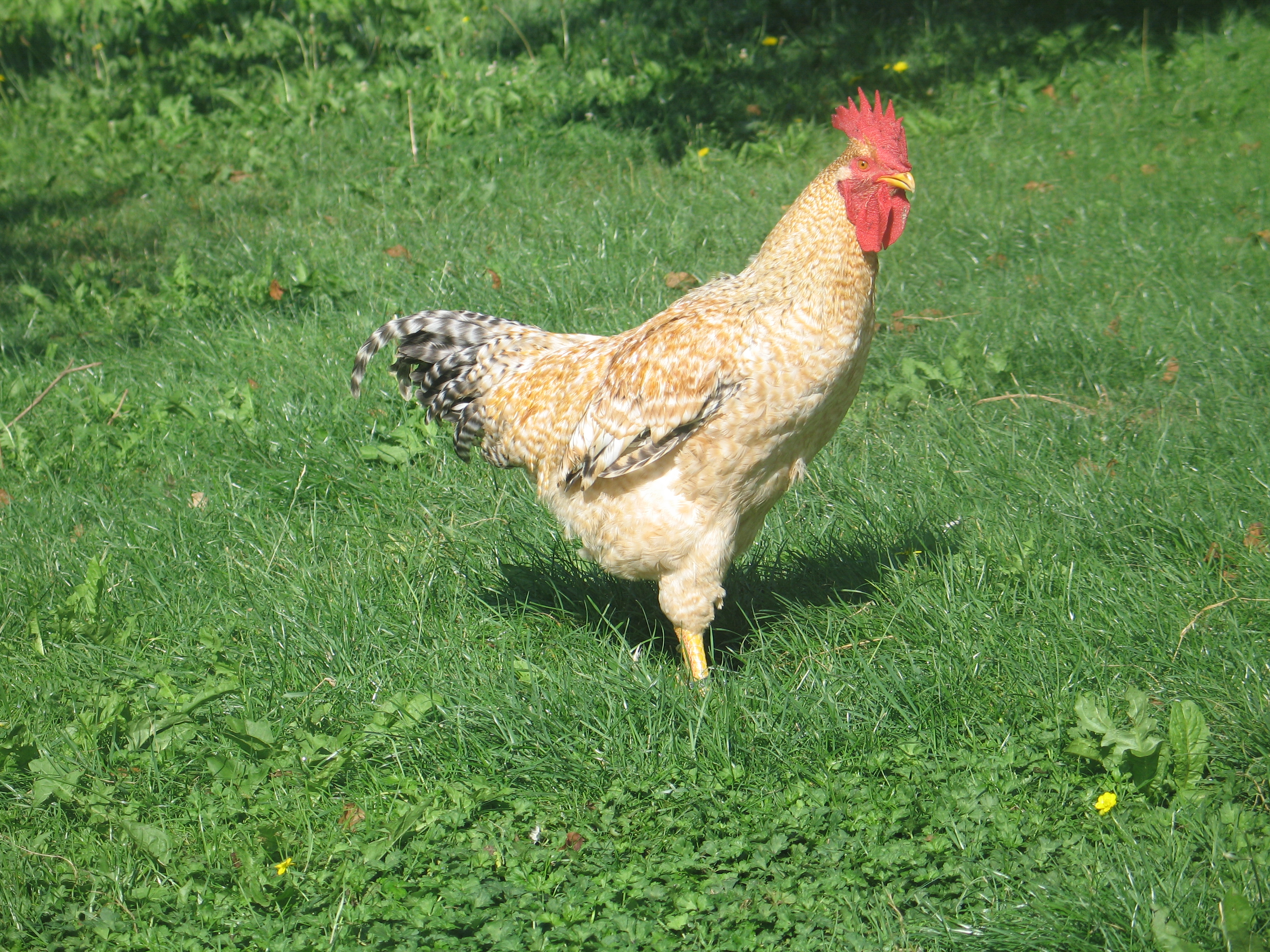
The Marraduna variety

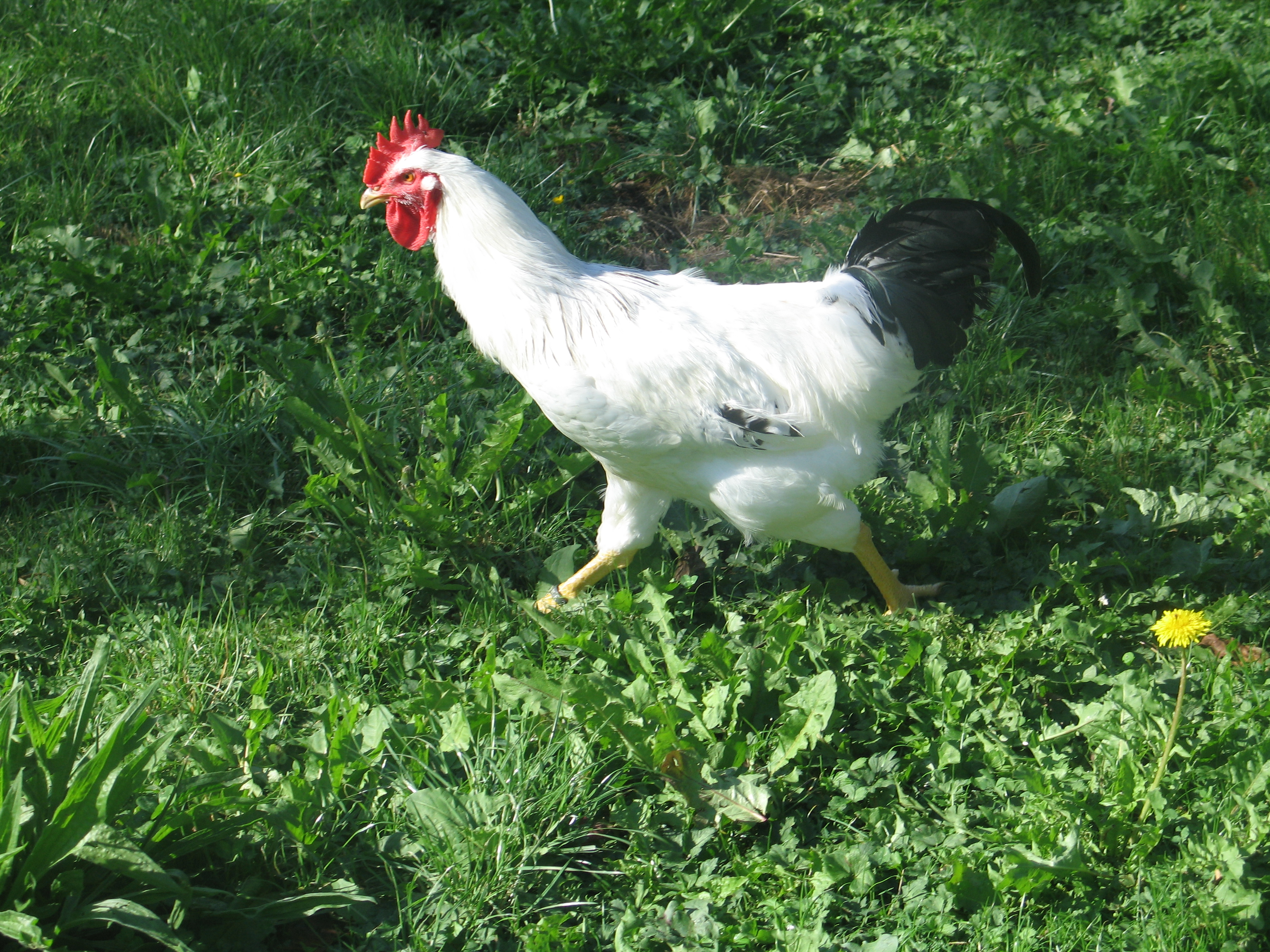
The Zilarra variety
