= Zygosity =

Degree of similarity of the alleles in an organism

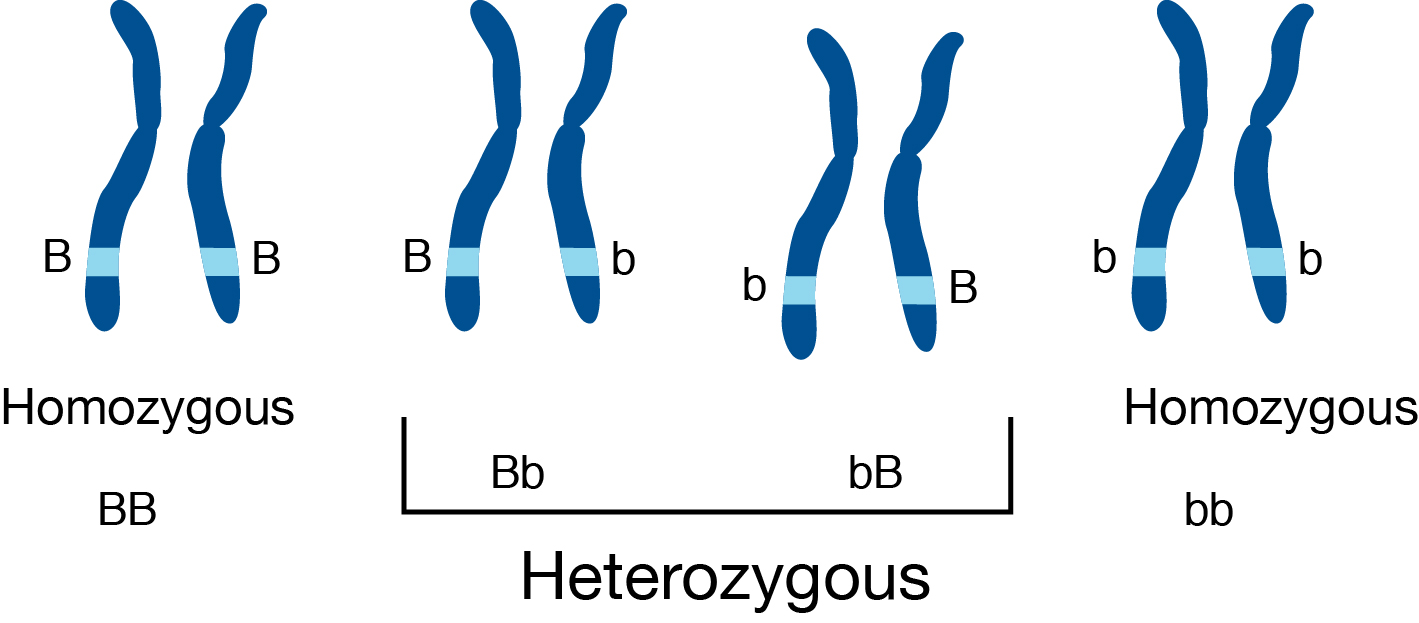
Homozygous and heterozygous

Zygosity (the noun, zygote, is from the Greek zygotos "yoked," from zygon "yoke") (/zaɪˈɡɒsɪti/) is the degree to which both copies of a chromosome or gene have the same genetic sequence. In other words, it is the degree of similarity of the alleles in an organism.

Most eukaryotes have two matching sets of chromosomes; that is, they are diploid. Diploid organisms have the same loci on each of their two sets of homologous chromosomes except that the sequences at these loci may differ between the two chromosomes in a matching pair and that a few chromosomes may be mismatched as part of a chromosomal sex-determination system. If both alleles of a diploid organism are the same, the organism is homozygous at that locus. If they are different, the organism is heterozygous at that locus. If one allele is missing, it is hemizygous, and, if both alleles are missing, it is nullizygous.

The DNA sequence of a gene often varies from one individual to another. These gene variants are called alleles. While some genes have only one allele because there is low variation, others have only one allele because deviation from that allele can be harmful or fatal. But most genes have two or more alleles. The frequency of different alleles varies throughout the population. Some genes may have alleles with equal distributions. Often, the different variations in the genes do not affect the normal functioning of the organism at all. For some genes, one allele may be common, and another allele may be rare. Sometimes, one allele is a disease-causing variation while another allele is healthy.

In diploid organisms, one allele is inherited from the male parent and one from the female parent. Zygosity is a description of whether those two alleles have identical or different DNA sequences. In some cases the term "zygosity" is used in the context of a single chromosome.

== Types ==
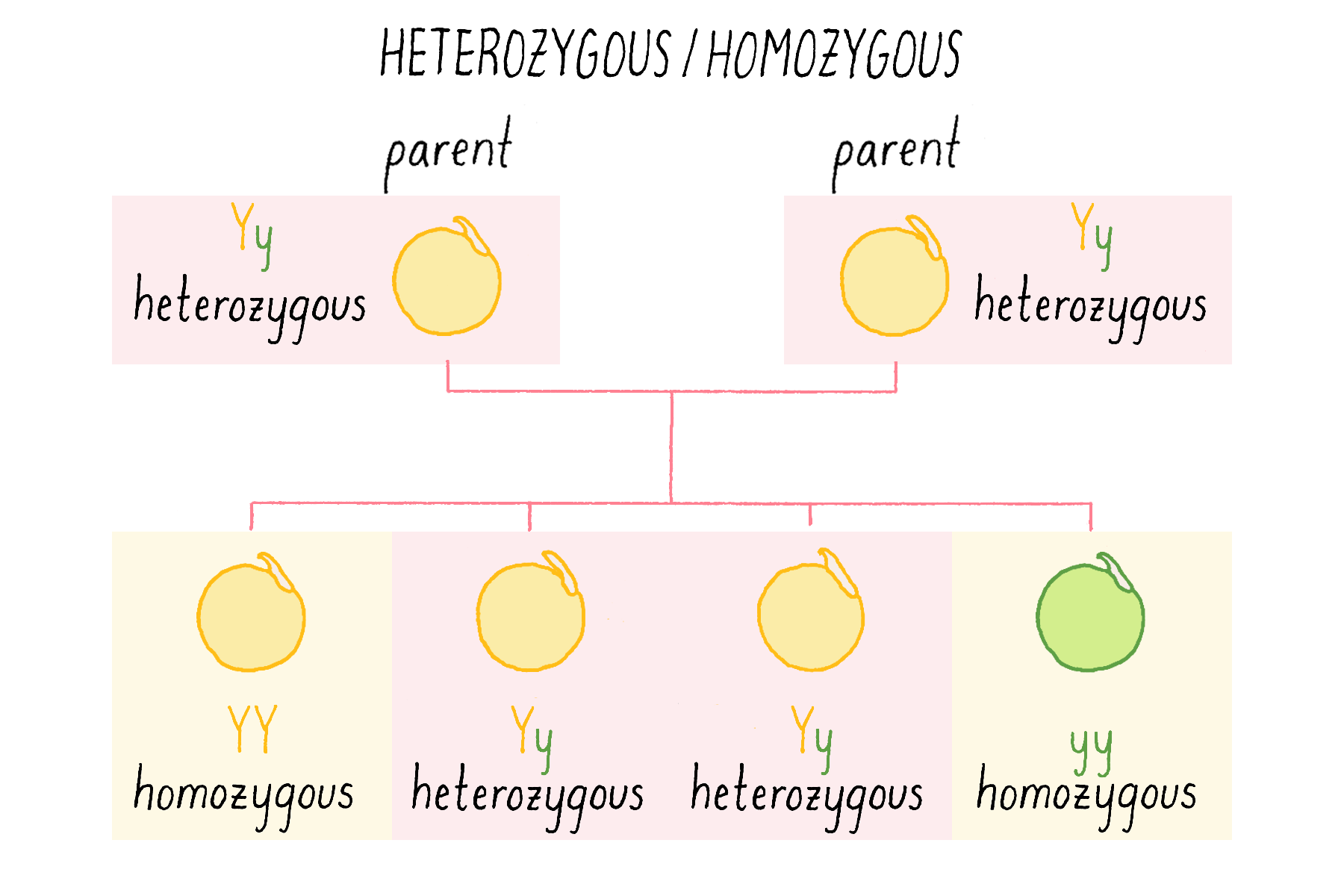
In diploid organisms like humans, one homologous chromosome is inherited from each parent. The equivalent genes from the two parents can confer the same trait (homozygous). However, the two inherited genes can be functionally non-identical and produce distinct traits (heterozygous)

Schematic karyogram of a human, showing a diploid set of all chromosomes, except in case of the sex chromosomes in males (bottom right), where there is an X chromosome and a much smaller Y chromosome, which does not have all the genes that the X chromosome has, making a male hemizygous for those genes.

The words homozygous, heterozygous, and hemizygous are used to describe the genotype of a diploid organism at a single locus on the DNA. Homozygous describes a genotype consisting of two identical alleles at a given locus, heterozygous describes a genotype consisting of two different alleles at a locus, hemizygous describes a genotype consisting of only a single copy of a particular gene in an otherwise diploid organism, and nullizygous refers to an otherwise-diploid organism in which both copies of the gene are missing.

=== Homozygous ===
A cell is said to be homozygous for a particular gene when identical alleles of the gene are present on both homologous chromosomes.

An individual that is homozygous-dominant for a particular trait carries two copies of the allele that codes for the dominant trait. This allele, often called the "dominant allele", is normally represented by the uppercase form of the letter used for the corresponding recessive trait (such as "P" for the dominant allele producing purple flowers in pea plants). When an organism is homozygous-dominant for a particular trait, its genotype is represented by a doubling of the symbol for that trait, such as "PP".

An individual that is homozygous-recessive for a particular trait carries two copies of the allele that codes for the recessive trait. This allele, often called the "recessive allele", is usually represented by the lowercase form of the letter used for the corresponding dominant trait (such as, with reference to the example above, "p" for the recessive allele producing white flowers in pea plants). The genotype of an organism that is homozygous-recessive for a particular trait is represented by a doubling of the appropriate letter, such as "pp".

=== Heterozygous ===
A diploid organism is heterozygous at a gene locus when its cells contain two different alleles (one wild-type allele and one mutant allele) of a gene. The cell or organism is called a heterozygote specifically for the allele in question, and therefore, heterozygosity refers to a specific genotype. Heterozygous genotypes are represented by an uppercase letter (representing the dominant/wild-type allele) and a lowercase letter (representing the recessive/mutant allele), as in "Rr" or "Ss". Alternatively, a heterozygote for gene "R" is assumed to be "Rr". The uppercase letter is usually written first.

If the trait in question is determined by simple (complete) dominance, a heterozygote will express only the trait coded by the dominant allele, and the trait coded by the recessive allele will not be present. In more complex dominance schemes the results of heterozygosity can be more complex.A heterozygous genotype can have a higher relative fitness than either the homozygous-dominant or homozygous-recessive genotype – this is called a heterozygote advantage.

=== Hemizygous ===
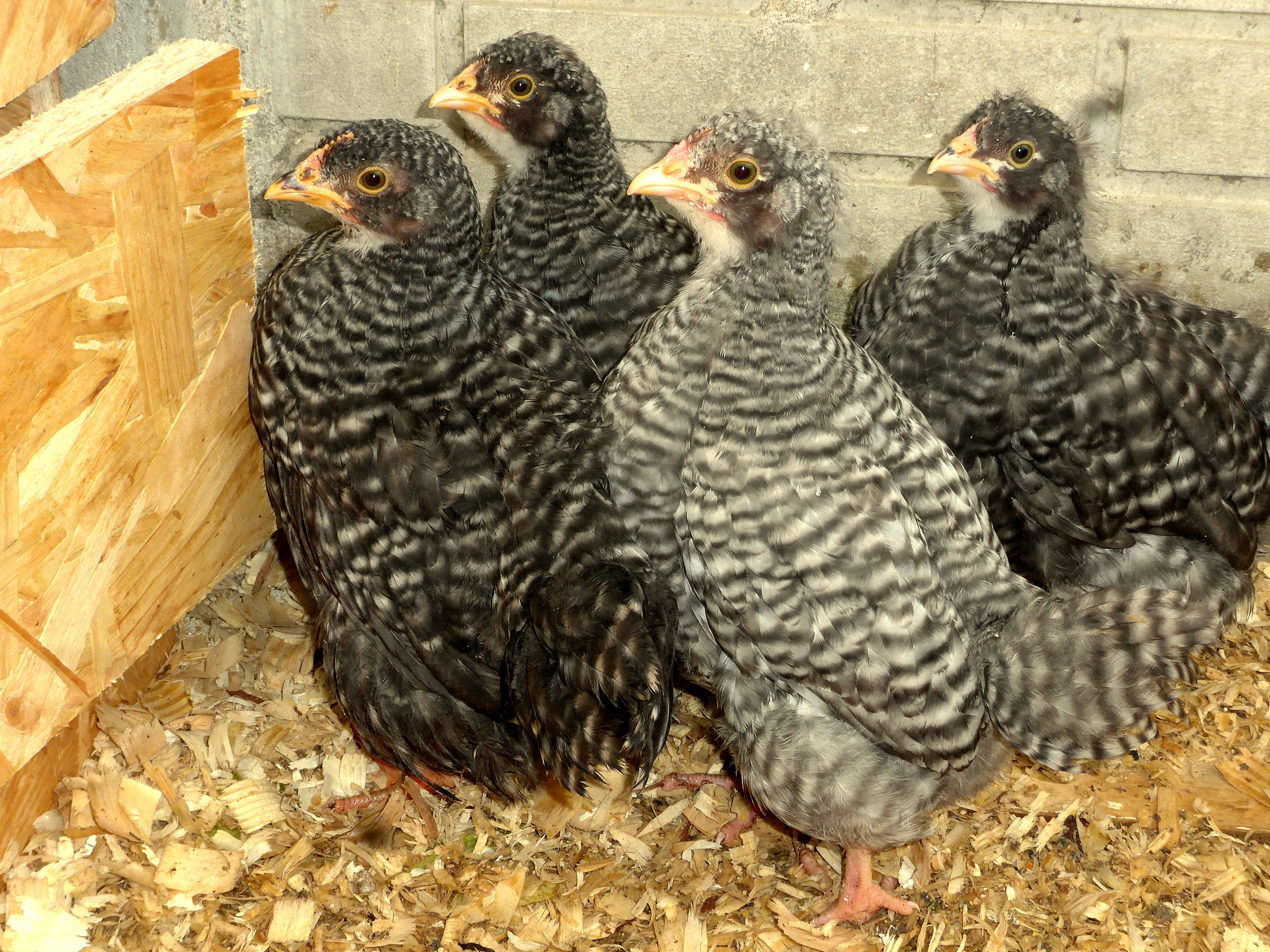
North Holland Blue youngstock showing the dosage effect of the "barred" trait: periods of pigmented feather growth are shorter in the homozygous cockerel, giving a lighter overall impression; the periods are longer in the hemizygous females, giving a darker overall impression.

A chromosome in a diploid organism is hemizygous when only one copy is present. The cell or organism is called a hemizygote. Hemizygosity is also observed when one copy of a gene is deleted, or, in the heterogametic sex, when a gene is located on a sex chromosome. Hemizygosity is not the same as haploinsufficiency, which describes a mechanism for producing a phenotype. For organisms in which the male is heterogametic, such as humans, almost all X-linked genes are hemizygous in males with normal chromosomes, because they have only one X chromosome and few of the same genes are on the Y chromosome.

In cultured mammalian cells, such as the Chinese hamster ovary cell line, a number of genetic loci are present in a functional hemizygous state, due to mutations or deletions in the other alleles.

=== Nullizygous ===
A nullizygous organism carries two mutant alleles for the same gene. The mutant alleles are both complete loss-of-function or 'null' alleles, so homozygous null and nullizygous are synonymous. The mutant cell or organism is called a nullizygote.

== Autozygous and allozygous ==
Zygosity may also refer to the origin(s) of the alleles in a genotype. When the two alleles at a locus originate from a common ancestor by way of nonrandom mating (inbreeding), the genotype is said to be autozygous. This is also known as being "identical by descent", or IBD. When the two alleles come from different sources (at least to the extent that the descent can be traced), the genotype is called allozygous. This is known as being "identical by state", or IBS.Because the alleles of autozygous genotypes come from the same source, they are always homozygous, but allozygous genotypes may be homozygous too. Heterozygous genotypes are often, but not necessarily, allozygous because different alleles may have arisen by mutation some time after a common origin. Hemizygous and nullizygous genotypes do not contain enough alleles to allow for comparison of sources, so this classification is irrelevant for them.

== Monozygotic and dizygotic twins ==
As discussed above, "zygosity" can be used in the context of a specific genetic locus (example). The word zygosity may also be used to describe the genetic similarity or dissimilarity of twins. Identical twins are monozygotic, meaning that they develop from one zygote that splits and forms two embryos. Fraternal twins are dizygotic because they develop from two separate oocytes (egg cells) that are fertilized by two separate sperm. Sesquizygotic twins are halfway between monozygotic and dizygotic and are believed to arise after two sperm fertilize a single oocyte which subsequently splits into two morulae.

== Medicine and disease ==
Zygosity is an important factor in human medicine. If one copy of an essential gene is mutated, the (heterozygous) carrier is usually healthy. However, more than 1,000 human genes appear to require both copies, that is, a single copy is insufficient for health. This is called haploinsufficiency. For instance, a single copy of the Kmt5b gene leads to haploinsufficiency and results in a skeletal muscle developmental deficit.

== Heterozygosity in population genetics ==
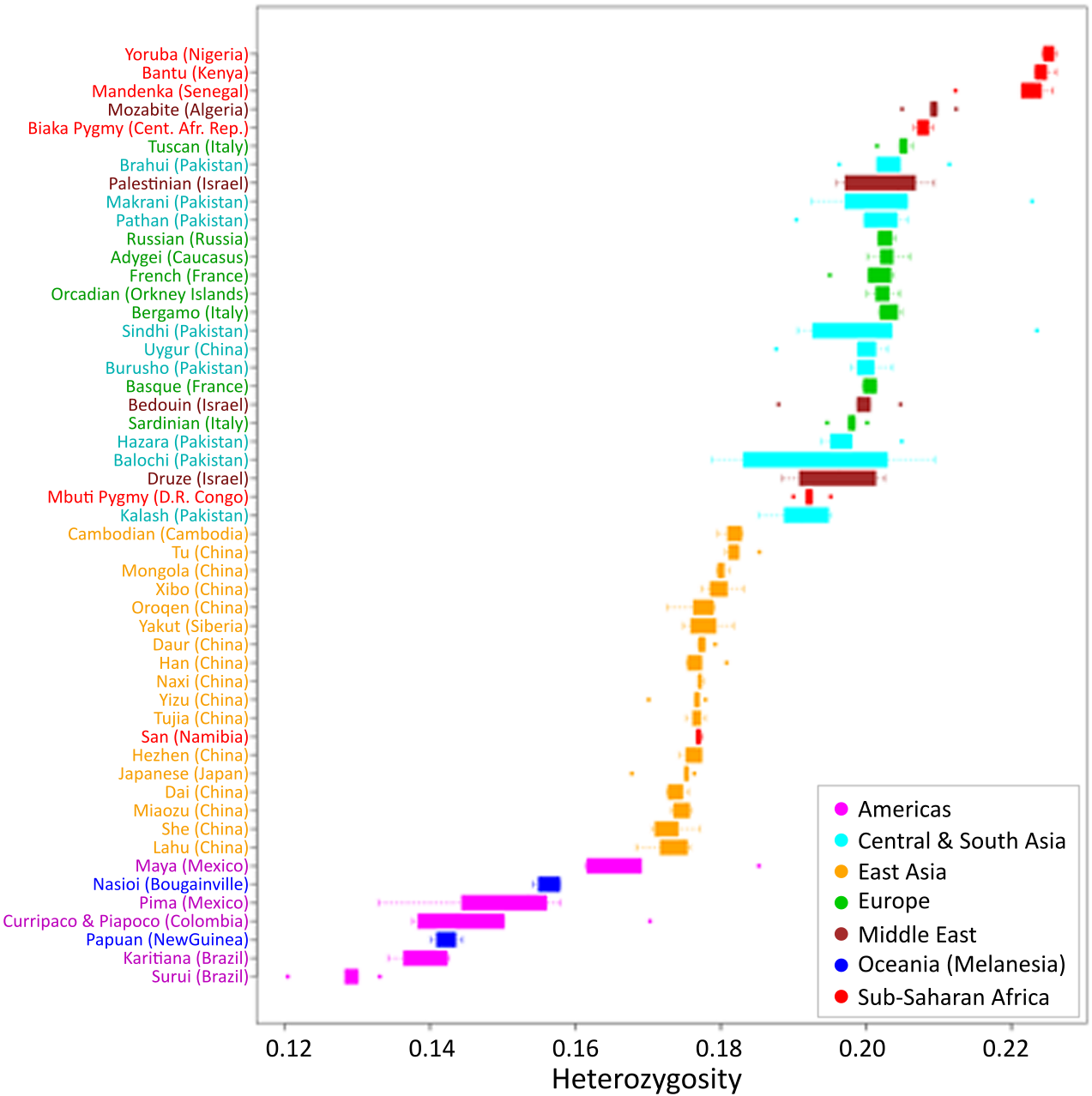
Heterozygosity values of 51 worldwide human populations. Sub-Saharan Africans have the highest values in the world.

In population genetics, the concept of heterozygosity is commonly extended to refer to the population as a whole, i.e., the fraction of individuals in a population that are heterozygous for a particular locus. It can also refer to the fraction of loci within an individual that are heterozygous.

In an admixed population, whose members derive ancestry from two or more separate sources, its heterozygosity is proven to be at least as great as the least heterozygous source population and potentially more than the heterozygosity of all the source populations. It reflects the contributions of its multiple ancestral groups. Admixed populations show high levels of genetic variation due to the fusion of source populations with different genetic variants.

Typically, the observed ($H_o$) and expected ($H_e$) heterozygosities are compared, defined as follows for diploid individuals in a population:

Observed
$$H_o = \frac{\sum\limits_{i=1}^{n}{(1\ \textrm{if}\ a_{i1} \neq a_{i2})}}{n}$$

where $n$ is the number of individuals in the population, and $a_{i1},a_{i2}$ are the alleles of individual $i$ at the target locus.

Expected
$$H_e = 1 - \sum\limits_{i=1}^{m}{(f_i)^2}$$

where $m$ is the number of alleles at the target locus, and $f_i$ is the allele frequency of the $i^{th}$ allele at the target locus.

== See also ==
- Heterosis
- Heterozygote advantage
- Loss of heterozygosity
- Nucleotide diversity measures polymorphisms on the level of nucleotides rather than on level of loci.
- Pseudolinkage
- Runs of homozygosity (ROH)
