= Pita Pinta Asturiana =

Spanish breed of chicken

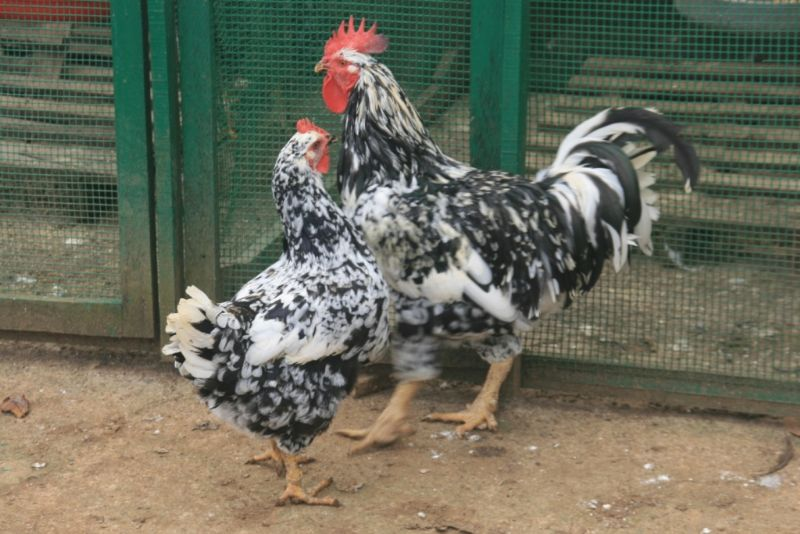
- Conservation status: FAO (2007): endangered; DAD-IS (2021): at risk
- Other names: Pita Pinta; Pinta Asturiana
- Country of origin: Spain
- Distribution: Principality of Asturias
- Use: dual-purpose, eggs and meat

Traits
- Weight: Male: 4–4.5 kg (8.8–9.9 lb); Female: 2.7 kg (6 lb)
- Skin colour: yellow
- Egg colour: burnt cream
- Comb type: single

Classification
- APA: no
- EE: no
- PCGB: no
- Chicken; Gallus gallus domesticus

The Pita Pinta Asturiana is a Spanish breed of chicken. It is the only chicken breed indigenous to the principality of Asturias, in north-western Spain.

== Etymology ==
The name comes from the Asturian language, in which pita means "hen" and pinta means "painted" or "mottled".

== History ==
The breed belongs to the Atlantic branch of domestic chickens and has common origins with other chicken breeds in the north of Spain, such as the Euskal Oiloa of the Basque Country. With the industrialisation of egg production in Asturias in the 1950s and 1960s, breed numbers fell dramatically, almost to the point of extinction. Recovery of the breed began between 1980 and 1990. A breeders' association, the Asociación de Criadores de la Pita Pinta Asturiana, was founded in 2003; its 52 members have a total of 1842 birds. A herd-book was established in 2005; at the end of 2013, a total of 2172 birds were recorded.

== Characteristics ==
The Pita Pinta is compact and of medium weight; cocks weigh about 4–4.5 kg, hens about 2.5–3 kg. The comb is single with 5 to 7 points, smaller in hens than in cocks. The earlobes are always red, and the eyes orange. The skin is yellow, and the beak and legs yellow with black spots. There are four colour varieties: Pinta Negra (mottled black); Pinta Roxa (mottled red-brown); Blanca (white); and Abedul (black). In the Pinta Negra variety the feathers are black, edged with white, giving the characteristic mottled look.

Ring size is 20 mm (0.8 in) for cocks and 18 mm (0.7 in) for hens.

== Use ==
The Pita Pinta is a good, regular layer, tough and responsive to the environment. Eggs are the colour of burnt cream, with a soft texture, and weigh 60–65 g (about 2 oz).
