= White-faced Black Spanish =

Breed of chicken

Spanish
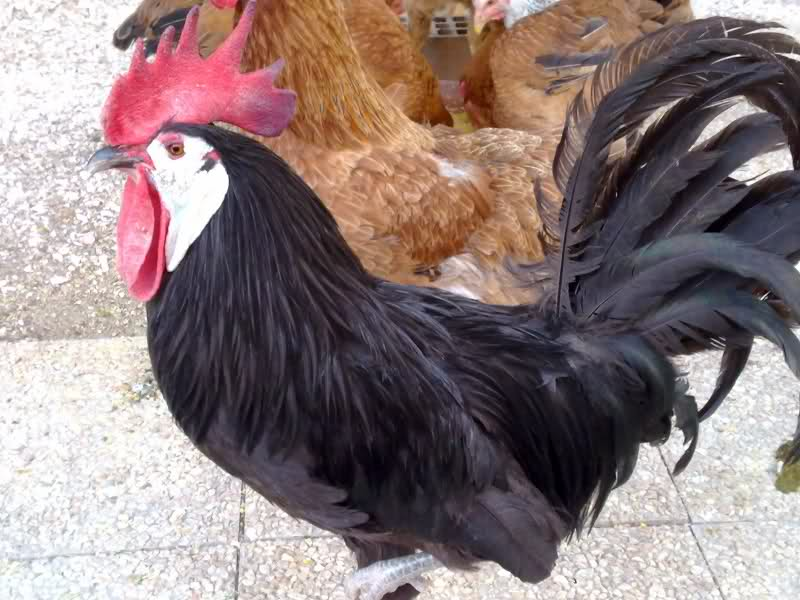
- Cock bird
- Other names: Cara Blanca; Española Cara Blanca; White-faced Spanish; White-faced Black Spanish
- Country of origin: Spain

Traits
- Weight: Male: 2.5–3 kg; Female: 2–2.5 kg
- Egg colour: white
- Comb type: single

Classification
- APA: Mediterranean
- ABA: single comb, clean legged
- EE: yes
- PCGB: rare soft feather: light
- Chicken; Gallus gallus domesticus

The Spanish or White-faced Black Spanish, Spanish: Cara Blanca or Española Cara Blanca, is a breed of domestic chicken which originated in Spain, but was largely bred to its present type in Great Britain in the eighteenth century. It is an older breed than the Minorca. It is distributed throughout the world, but is rare in Spain.

== History ==
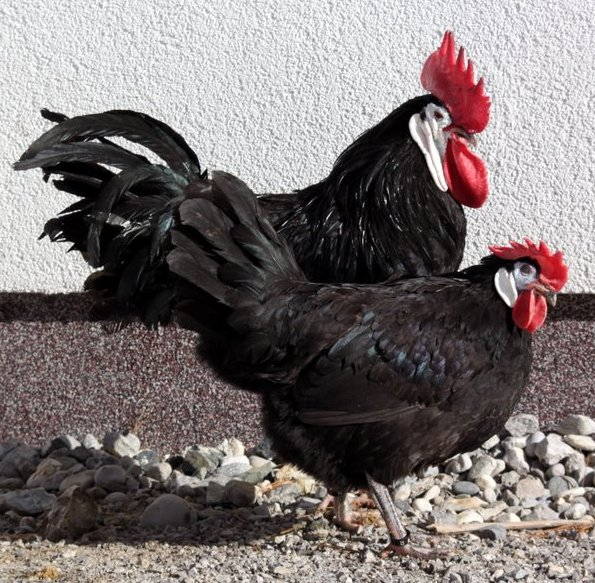
Cock and hen

This breed was admitted into the American Poultry Association in 1874.

== Characteristics ==
They have glossy black plumage and are closely related to the Minorca and Castellana Negra breeds. Their most distinguishing feature are their white, low-hanging ear-lobes, which are actually overdeveloped. They have a single comb, four toes, and no crest.

== Use ==
Hens are non-sitters, and lay 160–180 white eggs per year, with a weight of about 80 g.
