= Dominique chicken =

American breed of chicken

Dominique
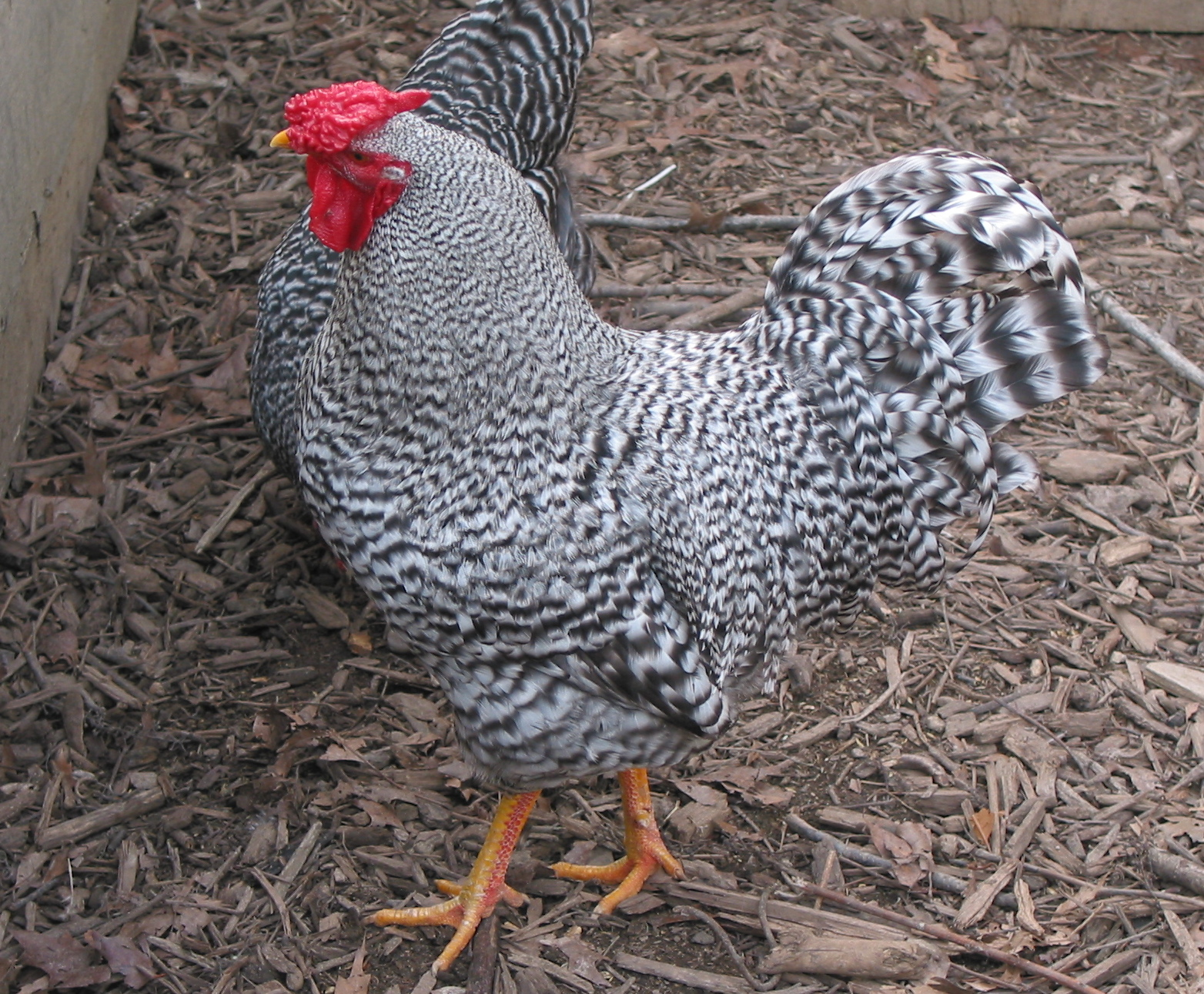
- Cock and hen

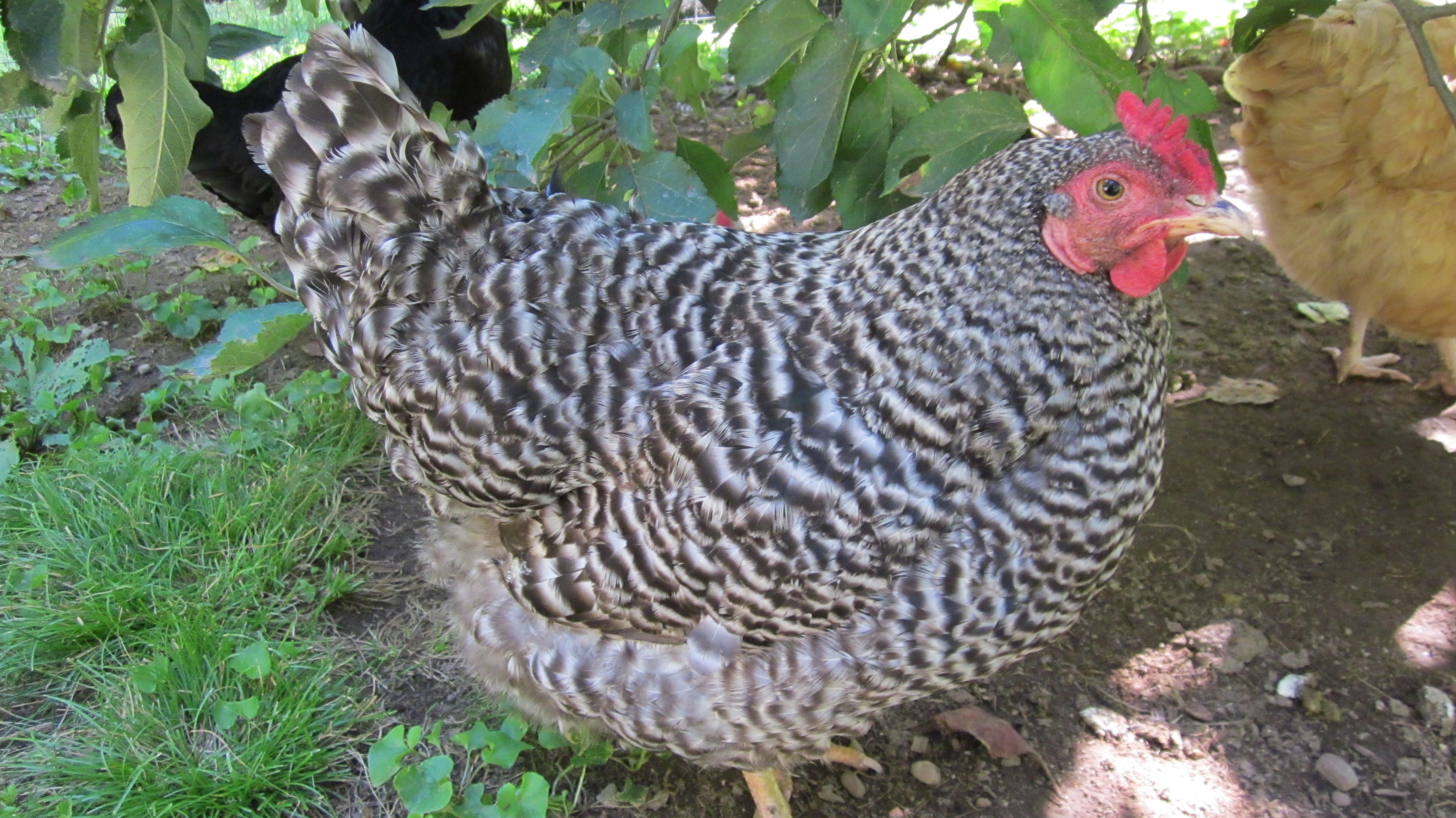
- Hen bird
- Conservation status: FAO (2007): not at risk; Livestock Conservancy (2021): watch; DAD-IS (2022): not at risk
- Other names: Dominicker; Dominico; Dominic; Pilgrim Fowl; Blue Spotted Hen; Old Grey Hen
- Country of origin: United States
- Use: dual-purpose, eggs and meat

Traits
- Weight: Male: Standard: 2.0–2.5 kg (4–6 lb); Bantam: 900 g (32 oz); Female: Standard: 1.75–2.25 kg (4–5 lb); Bantam: 700 g (25 oz)
- Skin color: yellow
- Egg color: brown
- Comb type: rose

Classification
- APA: American
- ABA: rose comb, clean legged
- EE: recognised
- PCGB: rare soft feather: heavy
- Chicken; Gallus gallus domesticus

The Dominique is an American breed of chicken, characterized by black-and-white barred plumage and a rose comb. It is considered to be the oldest American chicken breed, and is thought to derive from birds brought to America by colonists from southern England. It was well known by about 1750, and by the mid-nineteenth century was widely distributed in the eastern United States. It is a dual-purpose breed, but is kept principally for its brown eggs. It became an endangered breed in the twentieth century, but numbers have since recovered.

== History ==
The origins of the Dominique are unknown. It is considered to be the oldest American chicken breed, and is thought to derive from birds – probably similar to the modern Dorking or Sussex breeds – brought to America by colonists from southern England. Chickens with barred plumage, with either a single or a rose comb, were well known by about 1750, and by the mid-nineteenth century were widely distributed in the eastern United States. They were known by many names – among them Blue Spotted Hen, Dominic, Dominicker, Dominico, Old Grey Hen and Pilgrim Fowl – but were commonly known as Dominique. Some of the earliest books on poultry include these as a valuable American breed. Some were exhibited at the first American poultry show, held in Boston in 1849.

In the 1860s the Plymouth Rock was created by cross-breeding Black Java with large single-combed Dominiques; it was first exhibited in 1869. It was rather larger than the Dominique, but otherwise fairly similar. At a poultry show in New York in 1870, the organisers ruled that only rose-combed barred birds could be exhibited as Dominiques; those with single combs were to be entered as Plymouth Rocks. In 1871 this ruling was confirmed in a Standard of Excellence for the Dominique. In 1874 the Dominique was included in the first edition of the American Standard of Perfection of the new American Poultry Association; the Dominique bantam was added in 1960.

Breed numbers declined during the twentieth century, and by the 1970s the Dominique was close to disappearing. A recovery initiative was launched, and from 1983 numbers began to rise again. Until about 2003 its conservation status was listed as "critical" by the American Livestock Breeds Conservancy (now the Livestock Conservancy), with fewer than 500 breeding birds in North America. In 2021 it was listed as "watch" by the Livestock Conservancy, and was reported to DAD-IS as "not at risk".

== Characteristics ==
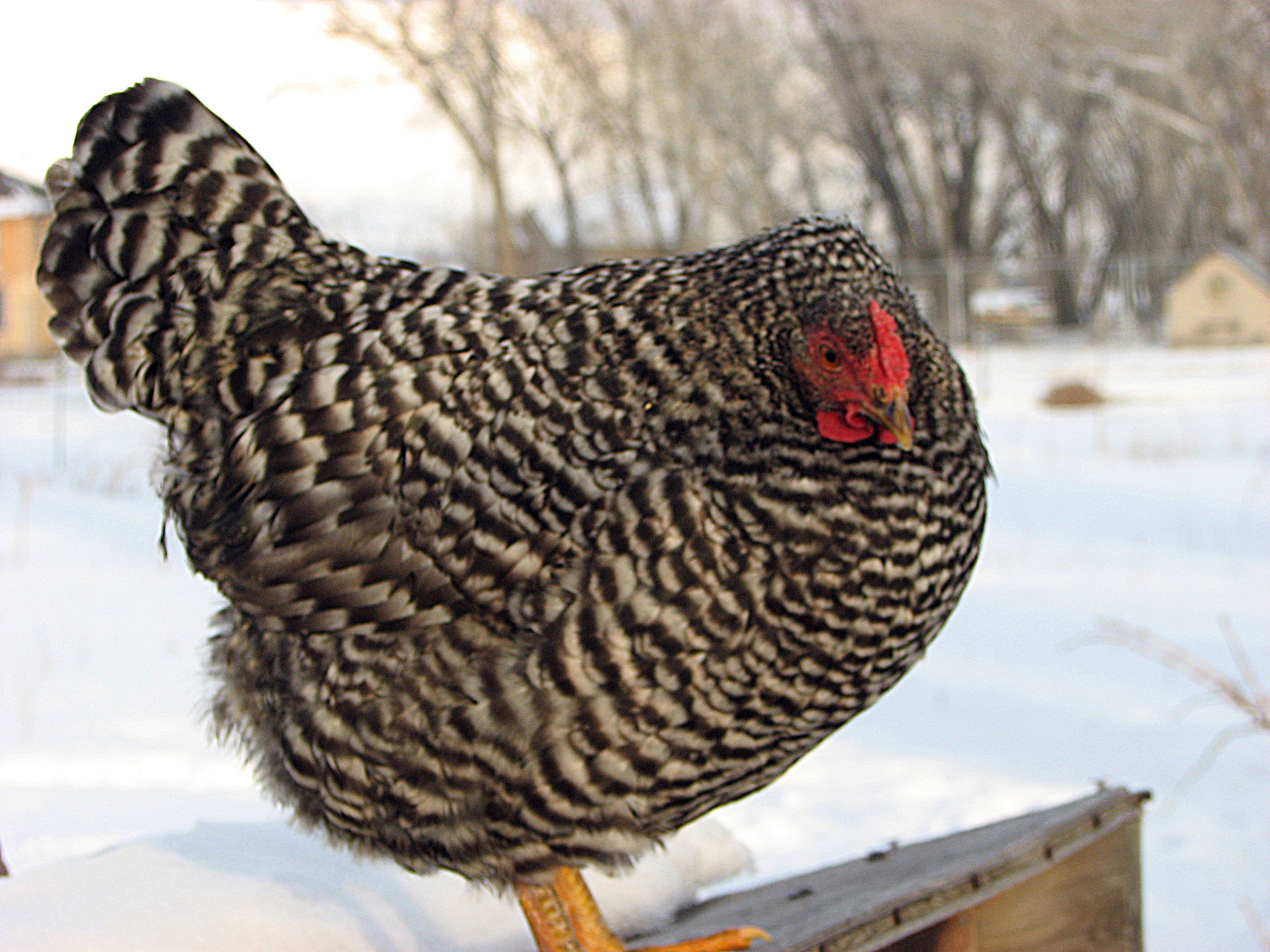
A six-month-old pullet

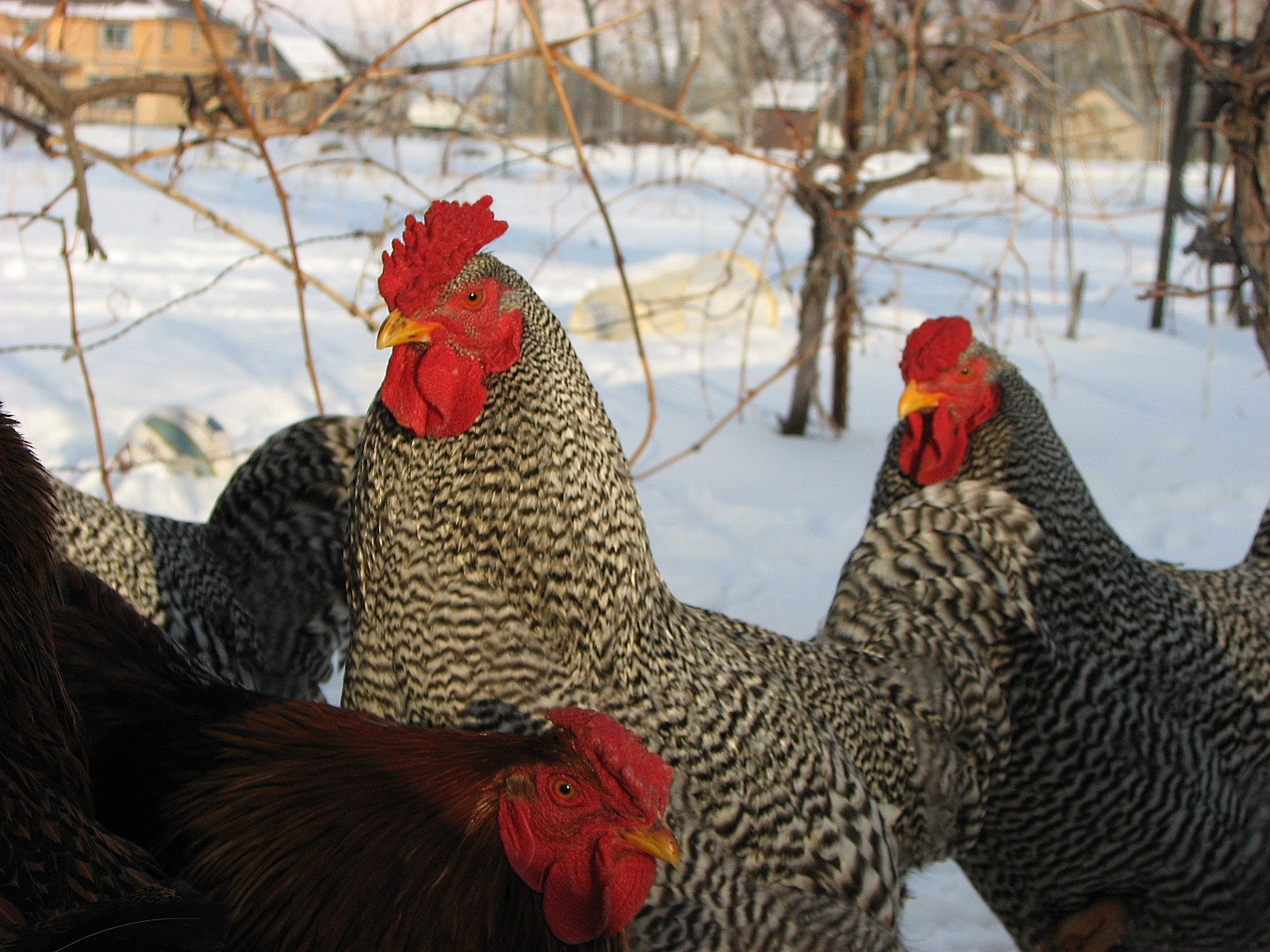
A trio of six-month-old cockerels

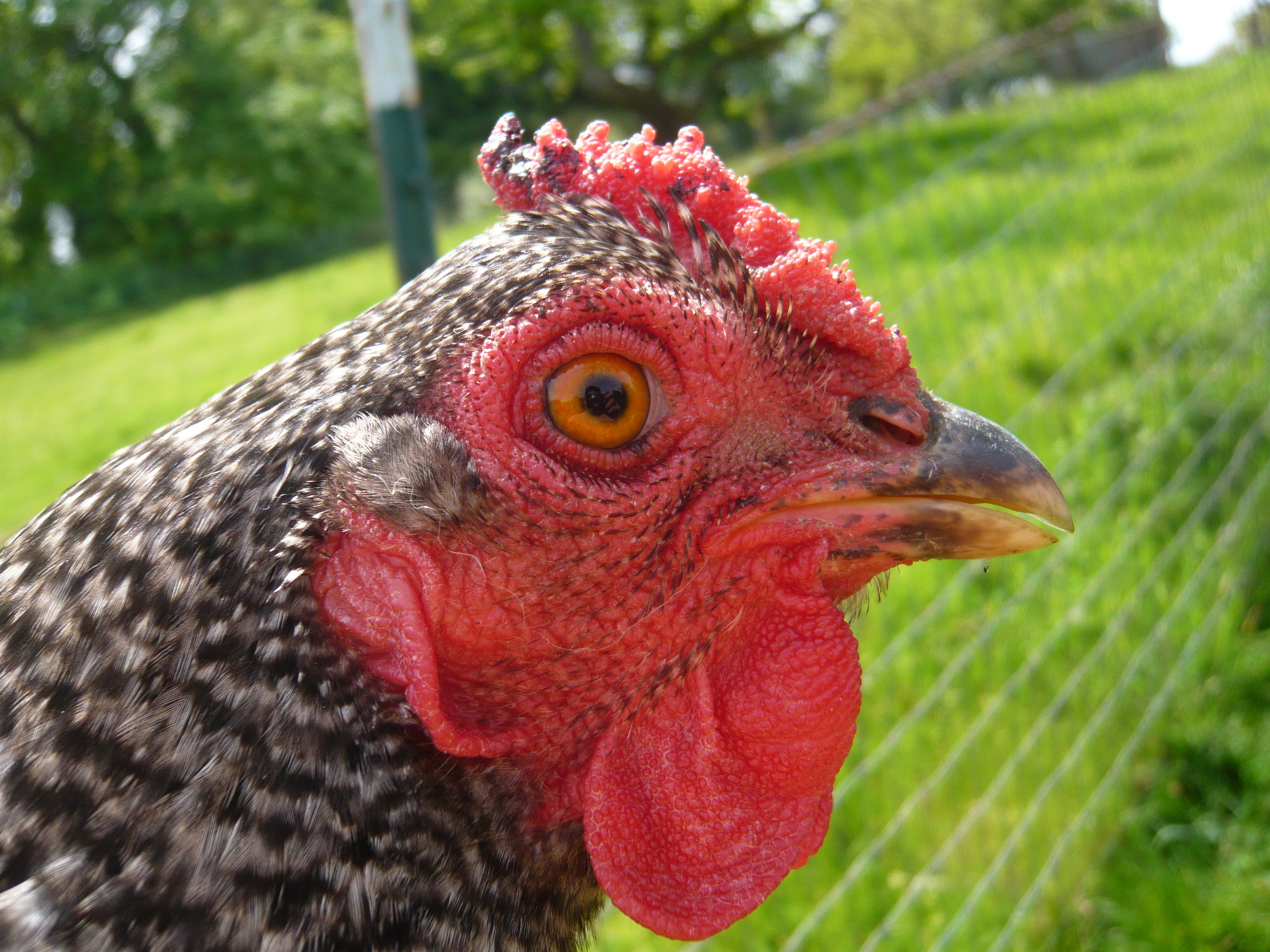
Head of a hen

The Dominique is of medium size; the weight range for hens is 1.75 to 2.25 kg, for cocks 2.0 to 2.5 kg. The only recognized plumage coloration is cuckoo, sometimes known as "hawk" coloration, a regular pattern of light and dark – but not black and white – barring.

The head is carried high, and has a rose-comb with a single backwards-pointing spike; the earlobes and wattles are red, and the beak yellow. The legs and feet are also yellow.

The plumage is held fairly tight to the body; because of this and the rose comb, it has better resistance to frostbite than some other breeds.

== Use ==
The Dominique is a dual-purpose breed, but is kept principally for its brown eggs, of which hens lay about 200 per year, with an average weight of 58 g.
