= Sex-linked barring =

Sex-linked barring is a plumage pattern on individual feathers in chickens, which is characterized by alternating pigmented and apigmented bars. The pigmented bar can either contain red pigment (phaeomelanin) or black pigment (eumelanin) whereas the apigmented bar is always white. The locus is therefore often referred to as an 'eumelanin diluter' or 'melanin disruptor'. Typical sex-linked barred breeds include the Barred Plymouth Rock, Delaware, Old English Crele Games as well as Coucou de Renne.

== Plumage appearance ==
The presence of a white bar on a dark background is distinguishing sex-linked barring from Autosomal barring, another plumage pattern in chickens which is created by a black bar on a light color background (white/ beige or brown) as exemplified by the breed Egyptian Fayoumi. The absence of pigment in the white bar has been attributed to a lack of pigment producing cells (melanocytes) in the feather follicle during feather growth. Initially it was proposed that this lack was the result of cell death as a consequence of the B locus mutation but later research demonstrated that the lack is the result of premature cell differentiation rather than apoptosis.

Male chicken of traditional sex-linked barred breeds like the Barred Plymouth Rock usually show much wider and clearer white bands than females of the same breed. Further characteristics of sex-linked barred chickens are the dilution of skin pigment in the legs as well as a white dot at the top of the head of freshly hatched chicks which can be used for autosexing: homozygous males have a much bigger spot than hemizygous females.

== Genetics ==
Sex-linked barring has been established as the dominant locus B by traditional mendelian genetics in the beginning of the 20th century. The responsible gene was predicted to be located on the Z chromosome and since male birds are homogametic (ZZ), they can be either hetero- or homozygous for sex-linked barring. Females are always hemizygous at this locus (ZW). In 2010 Swedish scientist have identified four mutations located in or around the tumor suppressor locus CDKN2A, which appear to be associated with sex-linked barring. The four mutations are organized in 3 different alleles named B0, B1 and B2. All alleles carry two non-coding mutation located in regulatory regions of the gene (the promoter and intron) but only B1 and B2 carry two additional missense mutations in a functional important domain of the protein. The B1 allele is causing the typical sex-linked barring phenotype/ appearance and is present in most modern sex-linked barred chicken breeds. Females or male chickens carrying the B2 allele in the heterozygous condition show a defined barring pattern but in the homozygous condition, males are essentially white with very little pigmentation. This phenotype has been initially described as a distinct but closely related mutation, however, it was later assigned to the same gene and termed 'Sex-linked Dilution'.

The B0 allele only carries the two non-coding mutations and its contribution to the barring pattern remained unknown as it only occurred in breeds that also carry the Dominant white mutation which is masking the effect at the B locus.). Recently scientists have removed the Dominant white mutation from chickens of those lines and were able to show that those chickens show a very light barring pattern. They named the phenotype 'Sex-linked Extreme Dilution'. As chickens with the B0 allele show the weakest barring pattern compared to those that have the coding mutation in addition, the scientists propose an evolutionary scenario in which the non-coding mutations occurred first and the two missense mutations later in time and independently. As only the combination of both non-coding and missense mutations give the desired and pronounced barring pattern, B0 alone is not present in modern Sex-linked barred breeds anymore.

== Molecular pattern formation in the feather follicle ==
Scientists were able to show that either both or one of the non-coding mutations present in all B alleles, cause an up-regulation of the activity of CDKN2A. ). With more of the gene product, which is called ARF (Alternate Reading frame Protein) in the cell, more of p53 is protected from degradation. p53 is a transcription factor which in turn activates more genes involved in cell cycle regulation and apoptosis. As a consequence the cell stops dividing and starts to prematurely produce pigment. The missense mutations in the B1 and B2 allele, however, have an opposite effect. Both missense mutations lead to a malfunctioning ARF protein, which is counteracting the effect of the higher activity of the gene to some degree. The premature production of pigment is still obvious but less strong as observed in the B0 allele. It is intriguing that the missense mutation in the B1 allele is much more disruptive for the protein function than the one in the B2 allele and the scientists believe that this is the reason for the observed phenotypic differences between those two alleles.

When the melanocyte progenitor cells start to migrate up from the bottom of the follicle into the barbs where they will make pigment, they further divide until a sufficient number of pigment cells is achieved. As a consequence of the up-regulation of CDKN2A, most cells will stop dividing and make new cells but instead start producing pigment- a black bar is emerging from the feather. But eventually, there will not be enough pigment cells anymore. As they are recruited from the bottom of the feather follicle, the feather keeps on growing, creating the white bar. With the new set of pigment cells, the cyclic behavior starts again, creating alternating pigmented and apigmented bars.

== Sex-linked barring mutations and melanoma ==
Mutations in CDKN2A have been associated with the occurrence of familial melanoma in humans. Changes in its gene product ARF often cause the cell to lose their ability for self-induced cell death or cell cycle arrest, which are mechanisms of cells to manage uncontrolled cell divisions and therefore the occurrence of cancer. It is intriguing that chickens carrying the B1 or B2 allele with a malfunctioning ARF do not show any higher prevalence to any type of cancer and are usually considered very sturdy and easy to keep breeds. It is also astonishing that the majority of the egg and meat production industry is relying on chickens, which have a defect in a tumor suppressor gene.
