= Utrerana =

Spanish breed of chicken

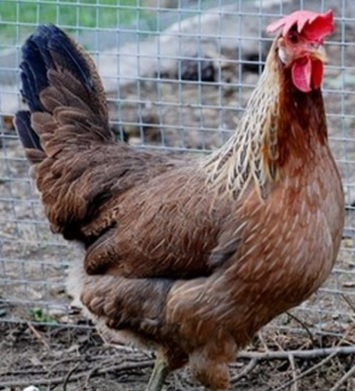

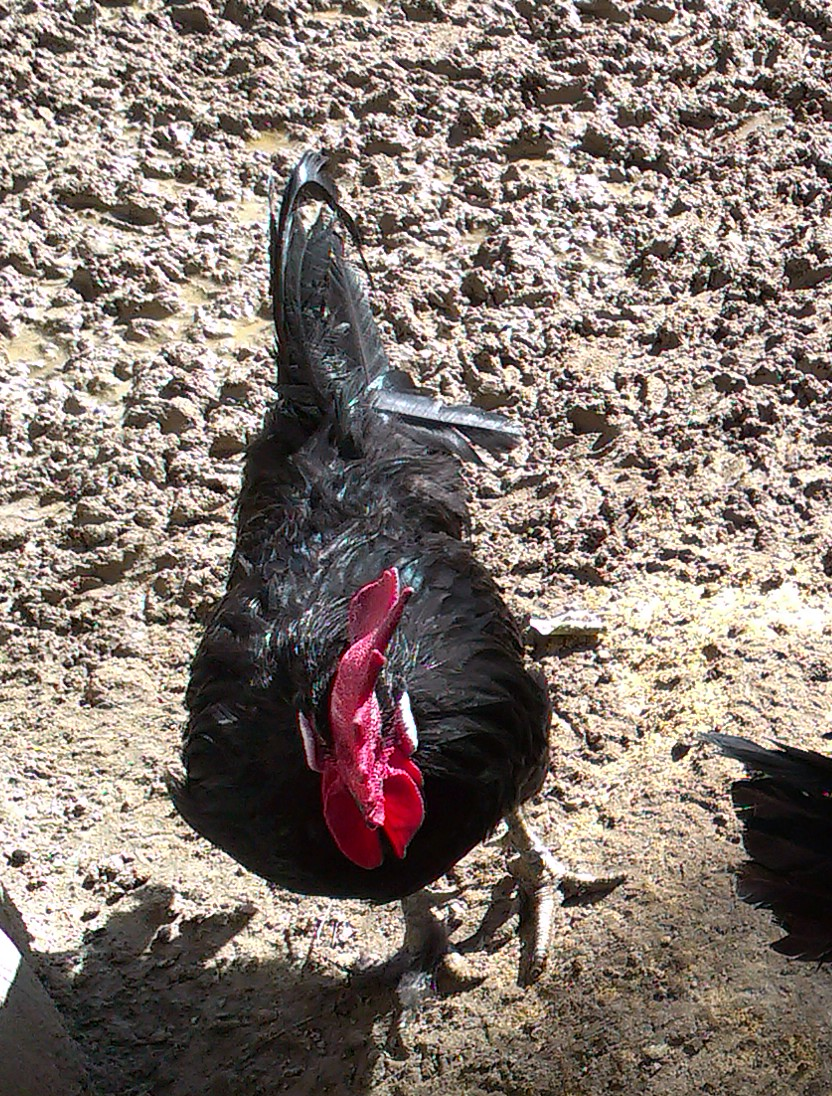
- Conservation status: FAO (2007): endangered; DAD-IS (2025): at risk/critical
- Country of origin: Spain
- Distribution: Andalusia

Traits
- Weight: Male: 3 kg; Female: 2.3 kg
- Comb type: single

Classification
- APA: no
- EE: listed, not recognised
- PCGB: no
- Chicken; Gallus gallus domesticus

The Utrerana is a Spanish breed of domestic chicken. It originates in – and is named for – the town of Utrera in the Province of Seville, in the autonomous community of Andalusia in south-western Spain.

== History ==
The Utrerana was bred from about 1926 by Joaquín del Castillo on his estate, the Granja Santa Matilde, near Utrera in Andalusia. He selectively bred the various rustic local chickens, initially with the single aim of improving their egg-laying capacity. From about 1930 he started to breed also for morphological characteristics, and began to establish three colour strains: the black, the barred and the white. A fourth colour variant, the partridge, was later developed.

== Characteristics ==
The Utrerana is of medium size: average body weight is about 2.3 kg for hens and about 3 kg for cocks. Four colour varieties are recognised: the barred (called franciscana), the black, the partridge and the white; the same four varieties are listed, but not recognised, by the Entente Européenne. The shanks and feet are slate-grey or black in the partridge and black variants, and unpigmented in the barred and the white; the ear-lobes are always white.

== Use ==
Hens lay about 180 eggs per year, with a weight of some 62–64 g. The meat is well-flavoured.
