= Castellana Negra =

Spanish breed of domestic chicken

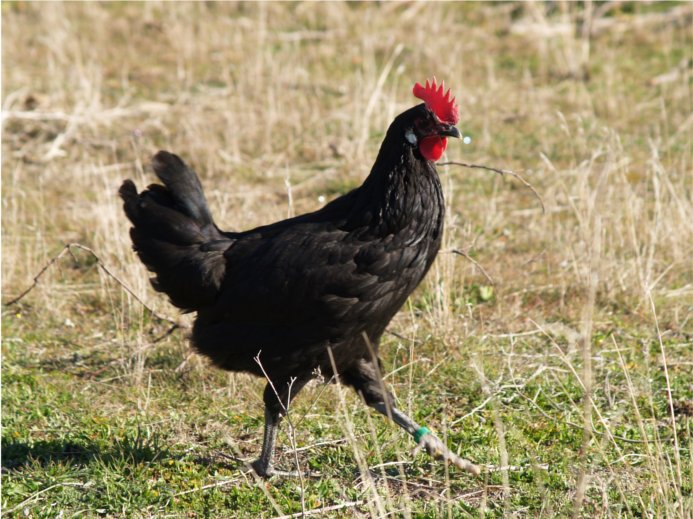
- A hen
- Conservation status: FAO (2007): not at risk; DAD-IS (2025): at risk/vulnerable
- Other names: Gallina Castellana Negra
- Country of origin: Spain
- Standard: MAGRAMA (in Spanish)

Traits
- Weight: Male: 2.8–3 kg; Female: 2.3 kg
- Skin colour: white
- Egg colour: white
- Comb type: single

Classification
- APA: not listed
- EE: recognised
- PCGB: not listed
- Chicken; Gallus gallus domesticus

The Castellana Negra or Gallina Castellana Negra is a Spanish breed of domestic chicken. It is a good egg-laying breed, rustic and disease-resistant. It was formerly widely kept and commercially exploited in Spain. Since the advent of imported commercial hybrid layer chickens and the spread of intensive chicken farming methods, it has almost disappeared.

== History ==
The Castellana Negra is thought to have been introduced to Al-Andalus by the Moorish invaders, and for this reason was sometimes known as moruna, 'Moorish'. It was widespread in southern and central Spain, but was not known in the northern part of the Iberian Peninsula until the late nineteenth century. Black chickens were known in various parts of the country under regional names such as the Zamorana in the province of Zamora, the Leonesa in the province of León (both in the autonomous community of Castilla y León), the Andaluza Negra in Andalucia or the Jerezana in the area of Jerez de la Frontera. How the black chickens of Castilla y León were selected and unified to become a breed is not documented. From the late nineteenth century it was so considered, and a breed standard was drawn up in 1926 by D. Enrique P. de Villamil; this was approved in 1930. Following the introduction of battery farming and imported commercial egg-laying hybrids, the Castellana Negra came close to disappearing. It was included in the conservation programme for indigenous chicken breeds of the Instituto Nacional de Investigación y Tecnología Agraria y Alimentaria, a public agrarian research institute, from 1975 to 2010.

Initial steps towards recovery of the breed were reported in 1981. Breeding was begun with two birds identified in Córdoba and a further ten from Mérida in Extremadura. The total population in Spain at that time was believed to be 50–200 birds. In 2009 there were some hundreds of Castellana Negra birds kept by the Instituto Nacional de Investigación Agraria, and about a thousand at the agricultural institute of the University of Valladolid at Soria. Isolated nuclei of the breed, not all pure-bred, were also reported from Zamora, León and Salamanca in Castilla y León, from the area of Toledo in Castilla-La Mancha, and from Andalucia.

The Castellana Negra was not included in the official list of indigenous Spanish breeds in the royal decree of 26 December 2008, which established the national livestock breed conservation programme, but was added to it by a ministerial order dated 4 March 2010. A new breed standard was approved on 24 March 2010 in a resolution which also authorised the breeders' association, the Asociación Nacional de Criadores de Gallinas Selectas de Pura Raza Castellana, to maintain the flock-book for the breed. The Castellana Negra is listed in the Catálogo Oficial de Razas de Ganado de España, the official catalogue of livestock breeds of Spain, among the indigenous breeds at risk of extinction. In 2025 its conservation status was listed as "at risk/vulnerable", based on a total population of about 2200 birds reported for 2024.

== Characteristics ==
The Castellana Negra is of Mediterranean type, lightly built and of medium size. Cocks weigh 2.8–3 kg and hens about 2.3 kg. The plumage is entirely black, with metallic greenish lights. The comb is single, with five or six well-defined points. The comb, face and wattles are red, the earlobes white. The beak is black or horn-coloured, and the legs and feet are the colour of dark slate.

== Use ==
Castellana Negra hens start laying at 4–5 months; they lay 200–225 white eggs per year, with an average weight of about 60 g.
