= Minorca chicken =

Spanish breed of chicken

Minorca
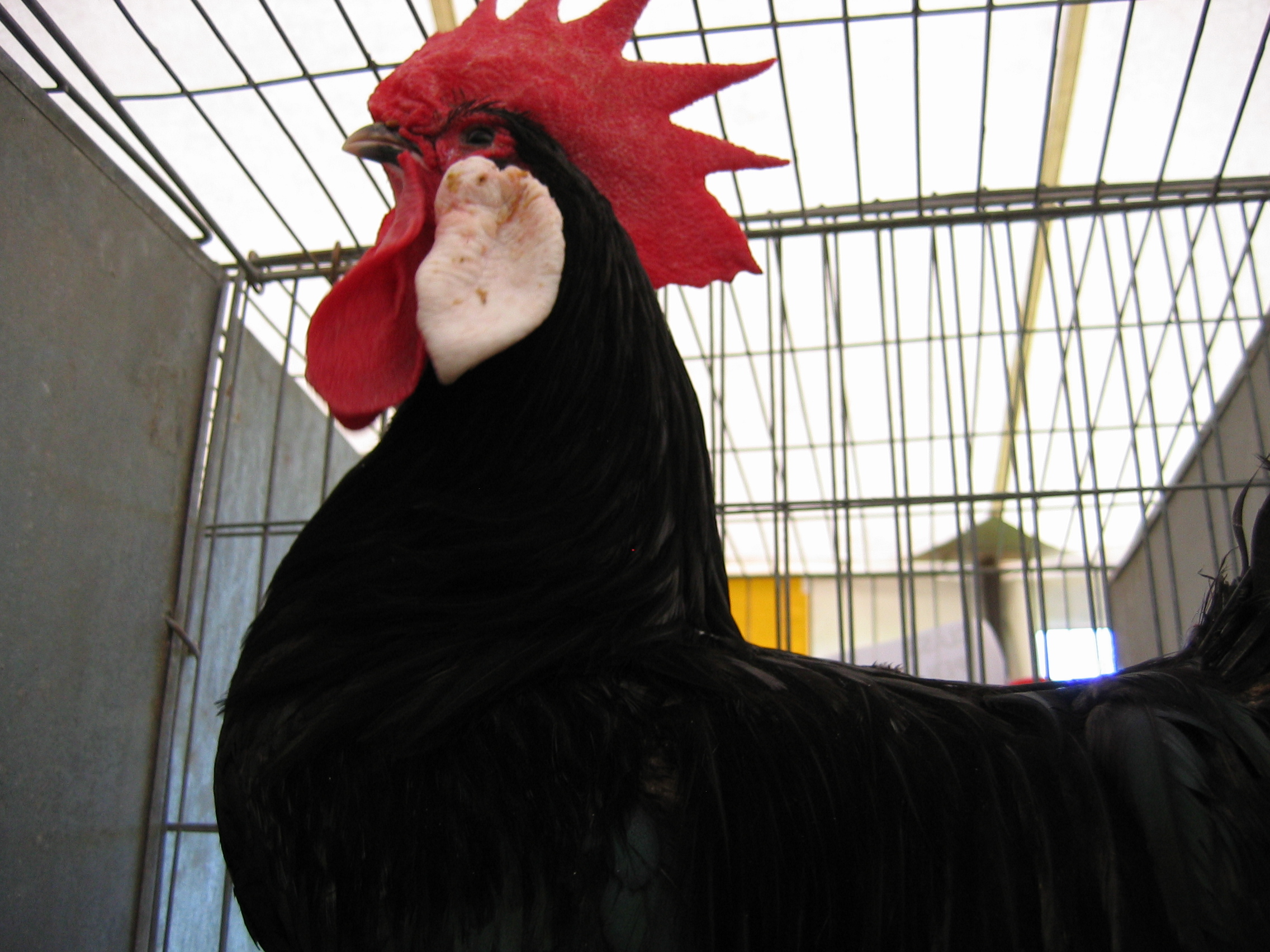
- A cock

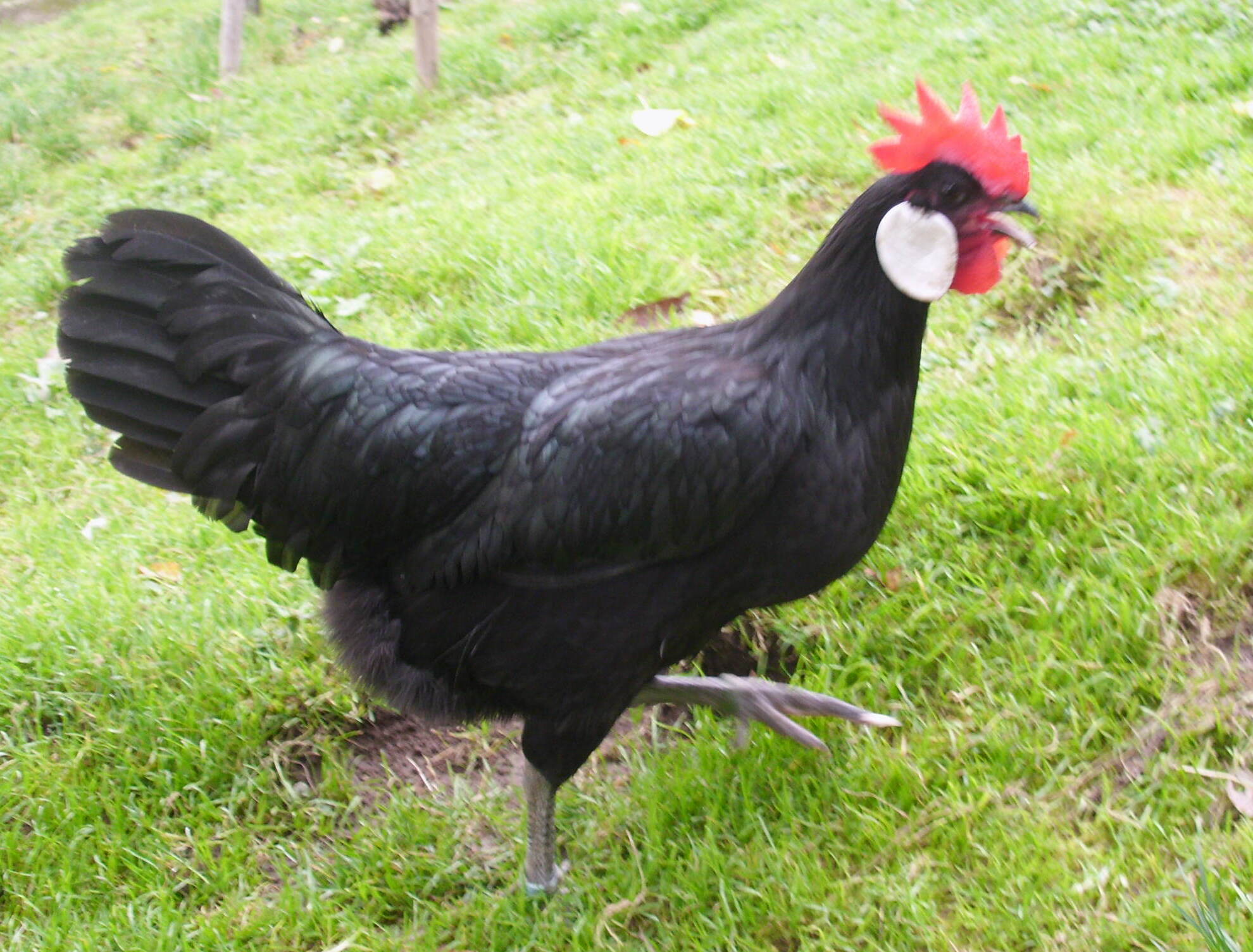
- A hen
- Conservation status: Spain: FAO (2007): not listed; DAD-IS (2026): unknown World: FAO (2007): not at risk; DAD-IS (2026): at risk
- Other names: Gallina de Menorca; Menorquina; Minorka
- Country of origin: Spain
- Distribution: world-wide

Traits
- Weight: Male: Menorca, measured: 2.834 kg; UK Standard: 3.20–3.60 kg; UK bantam: 960 g; Female: Menorca, measured: 2.210 kg; UK Standard: 2.70–3.60 kg; UK bantam: 850 g
- Egg colour: white
- Comb type: Spain: single, with 5 or 6 points; International: single or rose

Classification
- APA: Mediterranean
- ABA: single comb, clean legged; rose comb, clean legged
- EE: yes
- PCGB: soft feather: light
- Chicken; Gallus gallus domesticus

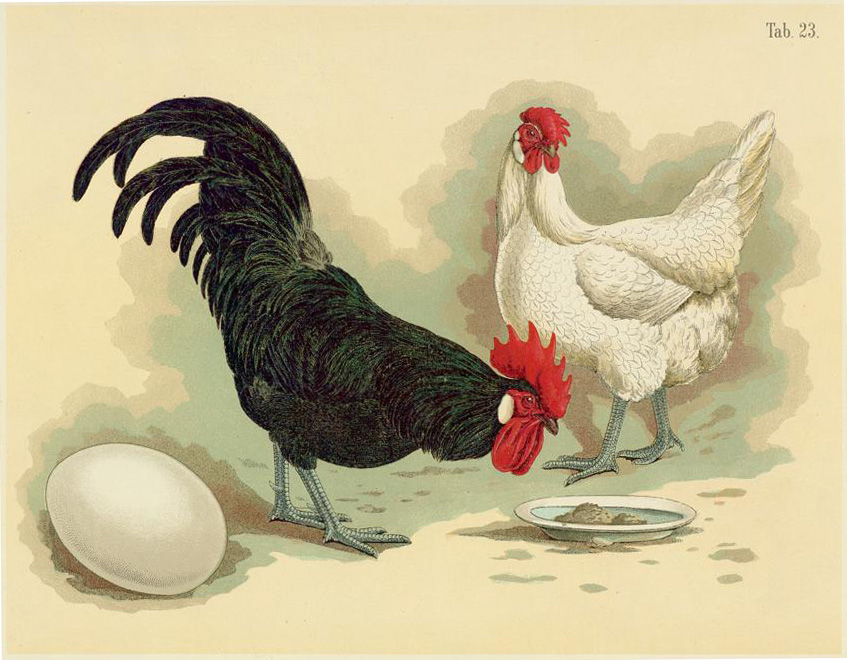
Black cock and white hen, illustration from the Geflügel-Album of Jean Bungartz, 1885

The Minorca, Catalan: Gallina de Menorca, Spanish: Menorquina, is a Spanish breed of domestic chicken originating in the Mediterranean island of Menorca in the Balearic Islands, to the south-east of Spain. It is a well-known exhibition bird in many countries of the world, but in the island of Menorca is an endangered breed and considered to be at risk of extinction.

== History ==
The international type of Minorca was created by the British from indigenous Menorcan birds. This process began during the British occupation of the island from 1708 to 1783, but It is not clear if it took place there or in Britain. It is likely that it began in Menorca and continued in Britain, where imports of chickens from Menorca in the 1780s are documented. By about 100 years later, the breed (which was considered a variety of the "Spanish") was common and long-established in the counties of Devon and Cornwall, in the south-west of England, where it was highly regarded as an egg-laying breed. It had been exhibited in Paris, under the name "Barbezieux", and was widespread in the world. It reached Germany in the late 1870s, and was added to the Standard of Perfection of the American Poultry Association in 1888.

Various attempts were made to modify some of the physical characteristics of the breed, including body size (by cross-breeding with the Langshan), the size of the comb and earlobes, and the position of the neck. None of these attempts had any beneficial effect on its abilities as an egg-layer.

Until the twenty-first century the Menorquina was uncommon in its island of origin. In 2004 a project to assess the numbers and quality of the remaining stock in the farms and country houses of the island was completed at the Centre de Capacitació i Experiències Agràries de Mao, the agricultural college of Mahón, and the results published in 2006. A breeding flock selected for quality and consisting of 30 cocks and 150 hens was established at the college, and 600 birds were distributed to local breeders.

In 2012 a programme of conservation and improvement of the Menorquina breed was approved, to be managed by the Associació de Gallines Menorquines, the association of breeders of the chicken in the island.

In 2014 the Menorquina was listed by the Ministerio de Agricultura, Alimentación y Medio Ambiente, the Spanish ministry of agriculture, among the indigenous breeds at risk of extinction. The population in Spain at the end of 2012 was 460 birds, of which all were in the Balearic Islands; no population data has since been reported.

In 2026 the international Minorca was reported by nine countries: Australia, Canada, Ireland, New Zealand, Norway, the Russian Federation, the United Kingdom, the United States and Uruguay; four of these reported breed numbers, and the total world population was estimated to be 1056. The global conservation status was listed as 'at risk'.

== Characteristics ==
In Spain, the Menorquina is a breed of medium size, with uniformly glossy greenish-black plumage. Cocks weigh about 2.8 kg and hens about 2.2 kg. The back is sloping and the tail almost horizontal. The comb, face and wattles are bright red. The comb is smooth and single, with six well-defined points; it is erect in cocks, but in hens falls to one side. The wattles are large, smooth and fine-textured. The earlobes are white, very large, and oval or almond-shaped. The skin is white and the legs black or dark slate-coloured.

The British Poultry Standards call for a higher weight, in the range 2.70 to 3.60 kg for hens and 3.20 to 3.60 kg for cocks. In the United Kingdom black, blue and white colour varieties of the Minorca are recognised, and in some other countries there are buff and barred varieties. Rose-combed variants are recognised in several countries, not including Spain. There is also a Minorca bantam, which in some countries may also be rose-combed.

== Use ==
The Minorca is often kept as an ornamental breed. As a farm bird, it is an egg-laying breed. Hens start laying early, at about 26 weeks, and give about 120 white eggs per year. Eggs weigh more than 65 g from the 57th week of the life of the hen.

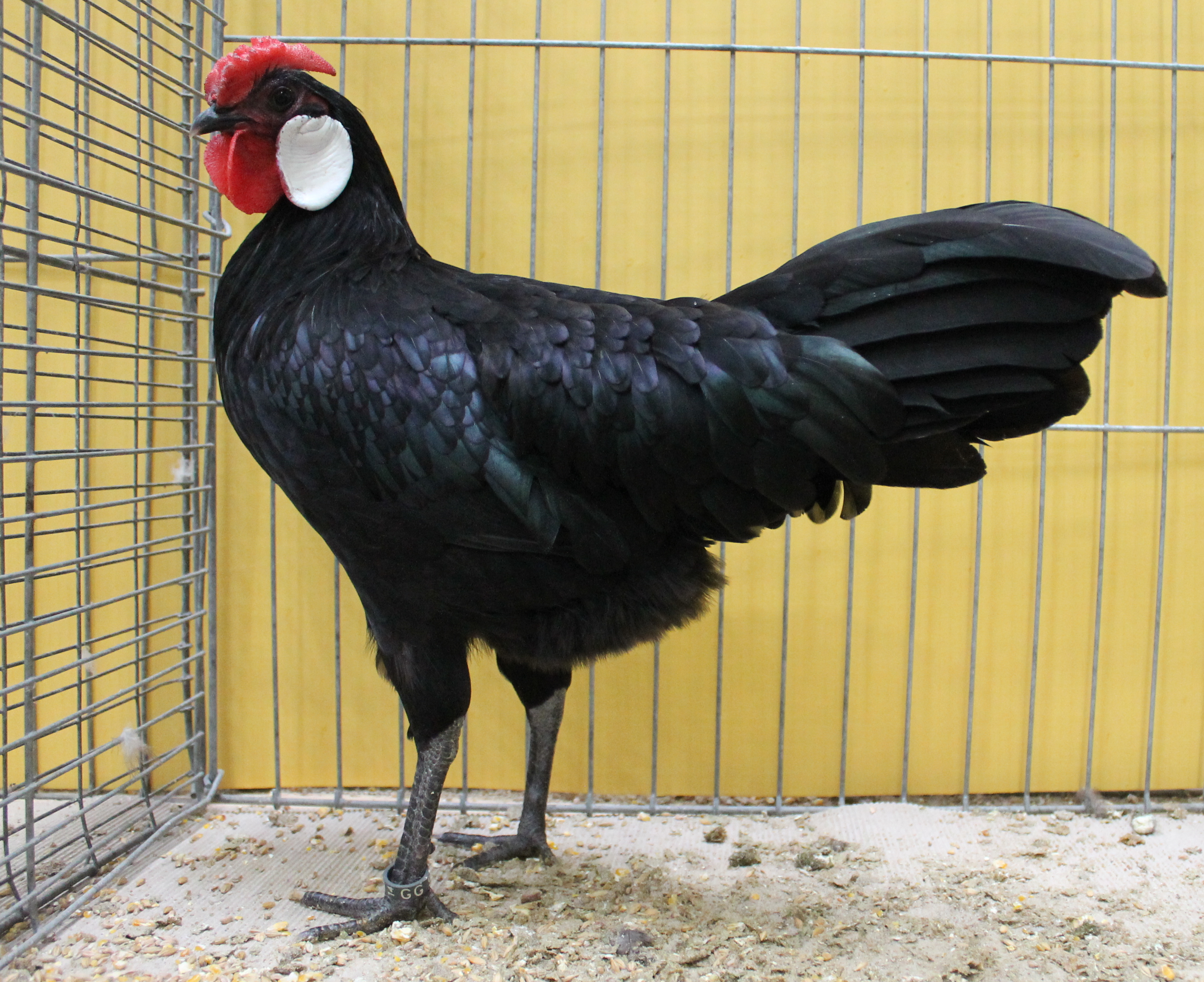
Rose-comb hen

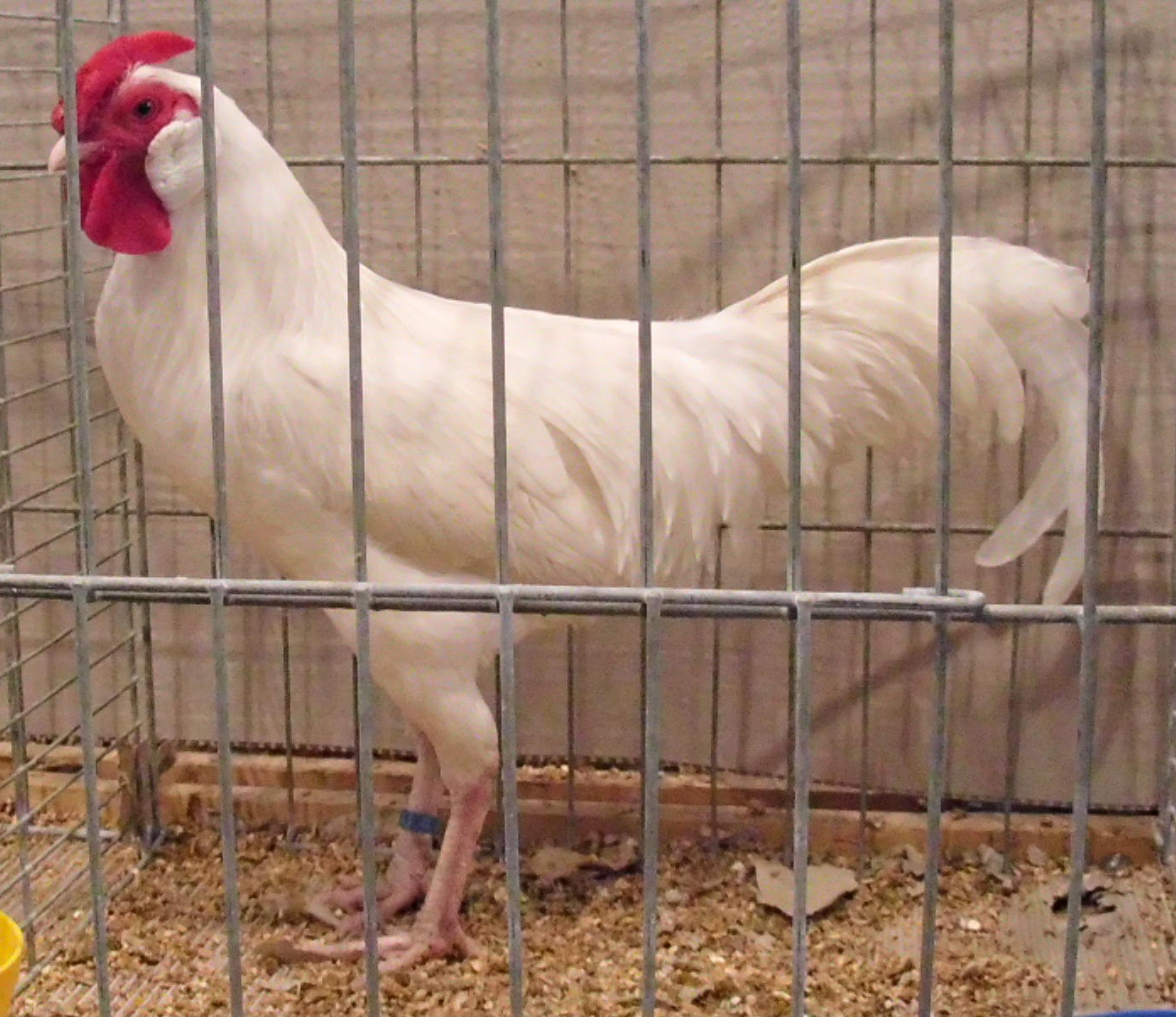
Bantam cock with rosecomb
