= List of Belgian chicken breeds =

This is a list of chicken breeds usually considered to be of Belgian origin. Some may have complex or obscure histories, so inclusion here does not necessarily imply that a breed is predominantly or exclusively from Belgium.The Campine is included here, but in Belgium is not considered to be a breed but, since 1926, to be identical to the Braekel.

Name in Dutch	Name in French	English name if used	Notes	Image
Aarschots Hoen	Poule d'Aarschot		standard	
Antwerpse Baardkriel	Barbu d'Anvers		true bantam	
Ardenner	Ardennaise		standard and bantam	
Ardenner Bolstaart	Sans-queue des Ardennes		standard and bantam	
Bassette	Bassette Liégeoise		true bantam	
Belgisch Kriel]	Naine belge	Belgian Bantam	true bantam	
	Bleue de Lasnes		true bantam; not recognised	
Bosvoordse Baardkriel	Barbu de Boitsfort		true bantam	
Brabants Hoen	Brabançonne		standard and bantam	
Brakel	Braekel		standard and bantam	
Brugse Vechter	Combattant de Bruges		standard and bantam	
Doornikse Kriel	Naine du Tournaisis		true bantam	
Everbergse baardkriel	Barbu d'Everberg		true bantam	
Famennehoen	Famennoise		standard and bantam	
	Fauve de Méhaigne		bantam	
Gele van Haspengouw; Gele van Mehaigne	Fauve de Hesbaye; Fauve de Méhaigne; Poule de Gembloux		standard	
Grubbe Baardkriel	Barbu de Grubbe		true bantam	
Herve Hoen	Herve		standard and bantam	
Hoen van de Zwalmvallei	Poule de la vallée de la Zwalm		standard	
Huttegems Hoen	Poule de Huttegem		standard; extinct	
Izegemse Koekoek	Coucou d'Iseghem		standard	
Kempisch Hoen	Campine		standard and bantam; not recognised in Belgium, considered as Braekel	
Luikse Vechter	Combattant de Liège		standard	
Mechelse Hoen	Malines		standard and bantam	
Mechelse Kalkoenkop	Malines à tête de dindon		standard	
Tiense Vechter	Combattant de Tirlemont		standard and bantam	
Ukkelse Baardkriel	Barbu d'Uccle		true bantam	
Vlaanderse Koekoek	Coucou des Flandres		standard	
Waasse Kriel	Naine de Waes		true bantam	
Watermaalse Baardkriel	Barbu de Watermael		true bantam	
Zingems Leghoen	Pondeuse de Zingem		standard	
Zingems Vleeshoen	Poulet de chair de Zingem		standard	
Zottegems Hoen	Poule de Zottegem		standard	
