= List of French chicken breeds =

This is a list of the chicken breeds usually considered to be of French origin. Some may have complex or obscure histories, so inclusion here does not necessarily imply that a breed is predominantly or exclusively from France. Not all of these breeds have existed continuously since they were first described; some, like the Pavilly, Merlerault and Caumont, became extinct in the early twentieth century and were later recreated.

Breed	Cock	Hen	Chick	Notes
Alsacienne	golden salmon bantam cock	black hen	blue chick	
Aquitaine				
Barbezieux				
Bourbonnaise				
Bourbourg				
Bresse Gauloise				
Caumont				
Caussade				
Charollaise				
Combattant du Nord				
Côtentine				
Cou-nu du Forez				
Coucou de Rennes				
Coucou des Flandres				
Courtes-Pattes				
Crèvecoeur				
Estaires				
Faverolles Allemande				
Faverolles Française				
Gascogne				
Gâtinaise				
Gauloise Dorée				
Géline de Touraine				
Gournay				
Hergnies				
Houdan				
Janzé				
La Fléche				
Landaise				
Le Mans				
Limousine				
Lyonnaise				
Mantes				
Marans				
Merlerault				
Meusienne				
Noire de Challans				
Noire du Berry				
Pavilly				
Pictave				
Poule des Haies				
Sans-Queue				

== Extinct breeds ==
- Ardeale
- Blanzac
- Chrisantheme
- Cocherelle
- Contres
- Coucou de France
- Coucou Picarde
- Coucou Soie
- Favoris
- Ivanaise
- Malgache
- Poule de Caux
- Poule de Marquise
- Poule de Saint-Omer
- Poule des Courrières
- Poule Lorraine
- Provençale
