= Tiense Vechter =

Breed of fighting cock

- Conservation status: critically endangered
- Other names: French: Combattant de Tirlemont; Dutch: Brabantse Vechter
- Country of origin: Belgium
- Use: cock-fighting

Traits
- Weight: Male: full-sized: 5 kg bantam: 600–700 g; Female: full-sized: 4 kg bantam: 700–800 g
- Skin colour: white
- Egg colour: cream-coloured
- Comb type: triple

Classification
- EE: yes
- Chicken; Gallus gallus domesticus

The Tiense Vechter, French: Combattant de Tirlemont, is a critically-endangered Belgian breed of gamecock. It dates from the late nineteenth century, and was bred specifically for cock-fighting. It named for its area of origin, that around the city of Tienen in Flemish Brabant, in eastern central Belgium. It is one of three Belgian breeds of fighting-cock, the others being the Brugse Vechter and the Luikse Vechter.

== History ==
The Tiense Vechter derives from the oldest of the three Belgian fighting-cock breeds, the Brugse Vechter, which originated in western Flanders in the early years of the nineteenth century and was formerly common throughout Belgium. In the later part of that century, in the area of Liège, in Wallonia in eastern central Belgium, efforts were made to improve the fighting capabilities of the Brugse Vechter by cross-breeding with fighting birds of Oriental origin, which gave rise to the Luikse Vechter. The Tiense Vechter was created in much the same way, in the provinces of Brabant, Liège and Limburg, and mainly in the area of Tienen in Flemish Brabant. It was reared particularly in the villages of Cumptich, Glabbeek, Hakendover, Oplinter and Vissenaken.

The Tiense Vechter is critically endangered. It is the most threatened of the three Belgian gamecock breeds. In 2010 there were 33 birds, all in Flanders.

A bantam Tiense Vechter was bred in the second part of the twentieth century. The plumage colours are superior to those of the full-sized breed. Like the full-sized bird, it is critically endangered.

== Characteristics ==
The Tiense Vechter is a large and powerful bird. Like the Luikse Vechter and unlike the Brugse Vechter, it has a steeply inclined back-line. Unlike both the other fighting breeds, it has no dark pigmentation of the face, skin and legs, which are all pale. The comb is triple, and the wattles are rudimentary or completely absent. In addition to the seventeen plumage colours recognised for the Brugse Vechter, there are four others, including cuckoo, which is the pattern most commonly seen.

== Use ==
The Tiense Vechter was bred for its fighting ability. Cock-fighting is against the law in Belgium, and practitioners of the sport usually travel to northern France. Some strains are reared only for exhibition at poultry shows.
