= Black copper =

Black copper may refer to:

- Tenorite, a mineral form of CuO
- Black copper metal, a low-grade form of copper used in copper recycling
- Black copper marans, a breed of chicken
