= Caumont =

Caumont may refer to:

== Places in France ==
- Caumont, Aisne, Picardy
- Caumont, Ariège, Aquitaine
- Caumont, Eure, Haute-Normandie
- Caumont, Gers, Aquitaine
- Caumont, Gironde, Aquitaine
- Caumont, Pas-de-Calais, Nord-Pas-de-Calais
- Caumont, Tarn-et-Garonne, Aquitaine
- Caumont-l'Éventé, Calvados, Basse-Normandie
- Caumont-sur-Durance, Vaucluse, Provence
- Caumont-sur-Garonne, Lot-et-Garonne, Aquitaine
- Caumont-sur-Orne, Calvados, Basse-Normandie
- Château de Caumont, in Cazaux-Savès, Gers department, see List of châteaux in the Midi-Pyrénées

== People ==
- Caumont family, or Lords of Caumont, who bore the title of Duc de La Force
- Arcisse de Caumont (1801-1873), French historian and archaeologist

== Other ==
- Caumont (chicken), a French chicken breed from Caumont-l'Eventé
