= Luikse Vechter =

Breed of fighting cock

- Conservation status: endangered
- Other names: French: Combattant de Liège
- Country of origin: Belgium
- Distribution: nationwide
- Use: cock-fighting

Traits
- Weight: Male: full-sized: 4.0–4.5 kg; bantam: 800–1100 g; Female: full-sized: 3.5–4.0 kg; bantam: 700–800 g
- Egg colour: cream-coloured
- Comb type: triple

Classification
- EE: yes
- Chicken; Gallus gallus domesticus

The Luikse Vechter, French: Combattant de Liège, is an endangered Belgian breed of gamecock. It dates from the late nineteenth century, and was bred specifically for cock-fighting. It is named for its area of origin, that of the city of Liège in Wallonia, in eastern central Belgium. It is one of three Belgian breeds of fighting-cock, the others being the Brugse Vechter and the Tiense Vechter.

== History ==
The Luikse Vechter derives from the oldest of the three Belgian fighting-cock breeds, the Brugse Vechter, which originated in western Flanders in the early years of the nineteenth century and was formerly common throughout Belgium. In the later part of that century, in the area of Liège, in Wallonia in eastern central Belgium, efforts were made to improve the fighting capabilities of the Brugse Vechter by cross-breeding with fighting birds of Oriental origin. The other Belgian fighting breed, the Tiense Vechter from the area of Tienen in Flemish Brabant, was created in much the same way.

The Luikse Vechter is endangered in Belgium, but is the least threatened of the three Belgian gamecock breeds. In 2010 there were 285 birds, about equally distributed in Flanders and in Wallonia. A few are reared in Germany.

A bantam Luikse Vechter was bred in the second part of the twentieth century. The plumage colours are superior to those of the full-sized breed. Although it is the most popular of the three bantam fighting breeds in Belgium, it is endangered. Some are reared in Germany and in the Netherlands.

== Characteristics ==
The Luikse Vechter is a large and powerful bird. The face is deeply pigmented, and may vary from purplish-red to almost black. The comb should in theory be triple like that of the Brugse Vechter; it was often single and also large, but – since 2000 – single combs are no longer allowed. The wattles are rudimentary or completely absent. The legs are thick and strong, and are slate-blue. The same seventeen plumage colours are recognised as for the Brugse Vechter. The most significant difference from the Brugse Vechter is in the line of the back, which in the Luikse Vechter is steeply angled, but in the Brugse Vechter is approximately horizontal.

== Use ==
The Luikse Vechter was bred for its fighting ability. Cock-fighting is against the law in Belgium, and practitioners of the sport usually travel to northern France. Some strains are reared only for exhibition at poultry shows.
