= Marans =

French breed of chicken

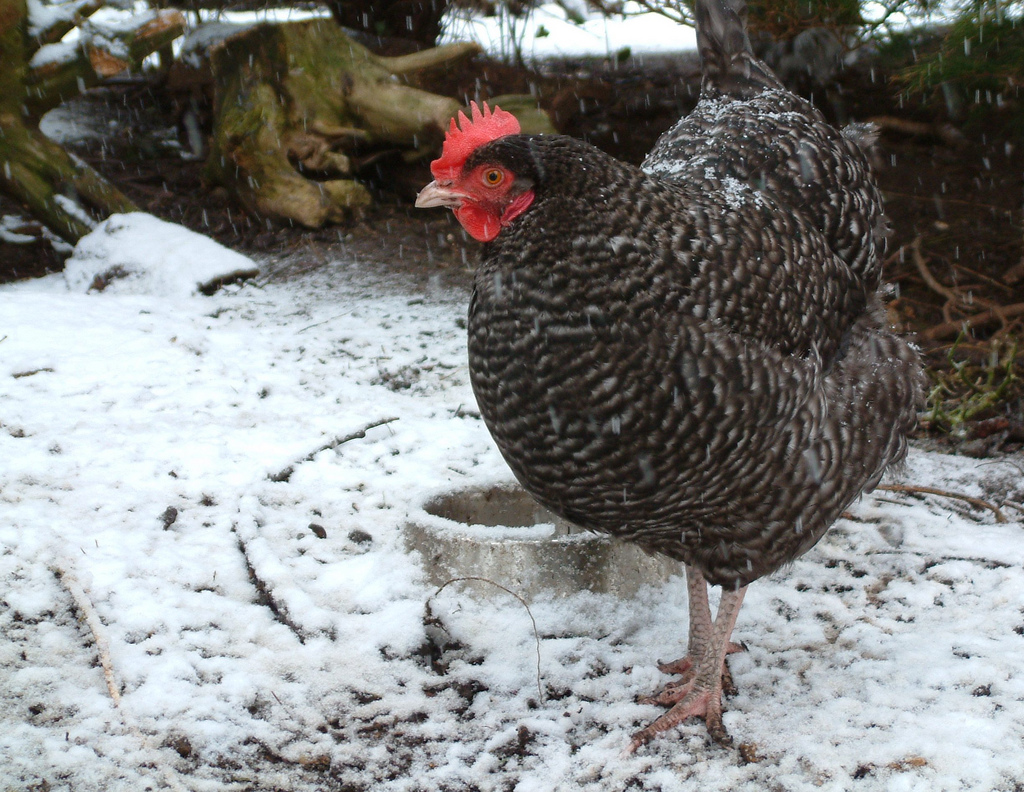
- A cuckoo Marans hen
- Other names: French: Poule de Marans
- Country of origin: France
- Standard: Marans-Club de France (in French)

Traits
- Weight: Male: Standard: 3.5–4 kg; Bantam: 1100 g; Female: Standard: 2.5–3 kg; Bantam: 900 g
- Egg colour: dark brown
- Comb type: single

Classification
- APA: Continental
- EE: yes
- PCGB: soft feather: heavy
- Chicken; Gallus gallus domesticus

The Marans, French: Poule de Marans, is a French breed of dual-purpose chicken, reared both for meat and for its dark brown eggs. It originated in or near the port town of Marans, in the département of Charente-Maritime, in the Nouvelle-Aquitaine region of south-western France.

The eggs are of an unusual rich brown, varying from mahogany to chocolate; only one other chicken breed, the Penedesenca of Catalonia, lays such a dark egg.

== History ==
The Marans originated in – and is named for – the town of Marans, in the département of Charente-Maritime, in the Nouvelle-Aquitaine region of south-western France.

It is believed to derive partly from birds brought by passing British ships to the port of La Rochelle, partly from local birds of the Marais Poitevin, and partly from imported Croad Langshan stock, of which from 1876 there were three breeders in the region.

It was first shown in La Rochelle in 1914 under the name poule du pays or 'local chicken'. A breed society was formed in 1929, and in 1931 the first breed standard was drawn up.

Several clutches of fertile eggs were imported to the United Kingdom in or soon after 1929 by Charles Kelvynge Greenway, the second Baron Greenway, and some were hatched. However, it is not certain that the Marans – with unfeathered shanks – shown by Lord Greenway at the Crystal Palace in 1934 descended even partly from this French stock. According to the Poultry Club of Great Britain, the British Marans derives from cross-breeding of a variety of breeds including the Braekel, the Coucou de Malines, the Coucou de Rennes, the Croad Langshan, the Gâtinaise, the Faverolles and the barred Plymouth Rock. It may be a distinct breed, unconnected to the French Marans.

== Characteristics ==
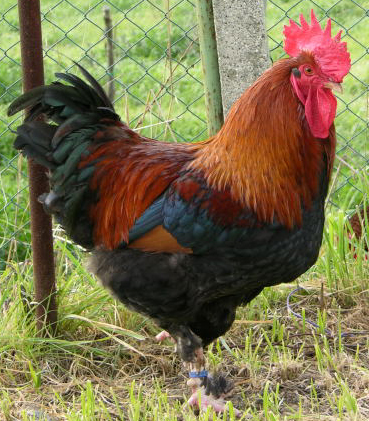
A wheaten Marans rooster

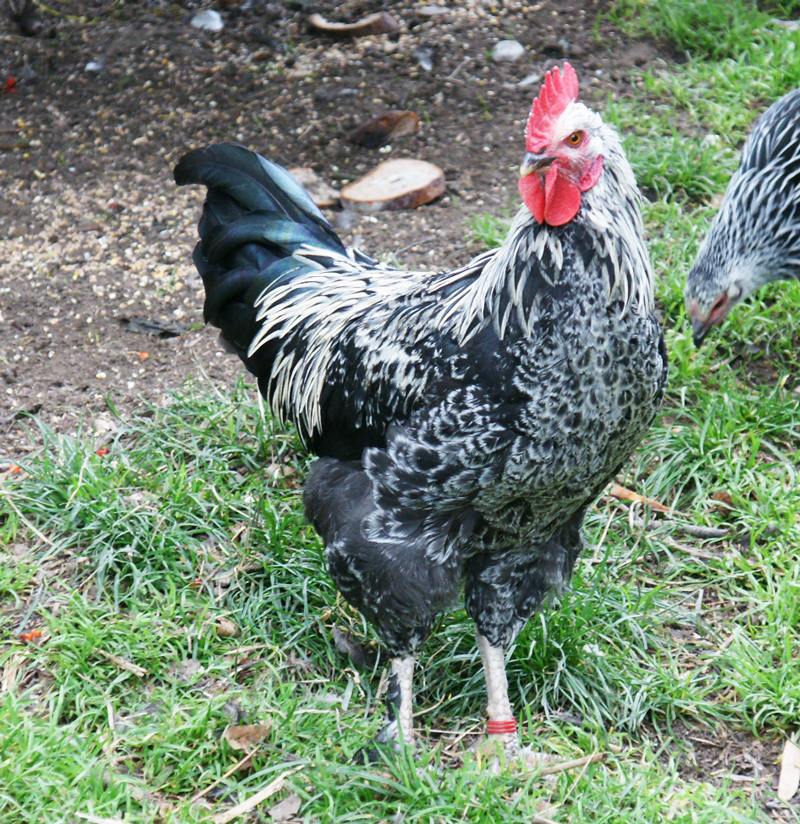
A silver-blue cockerel

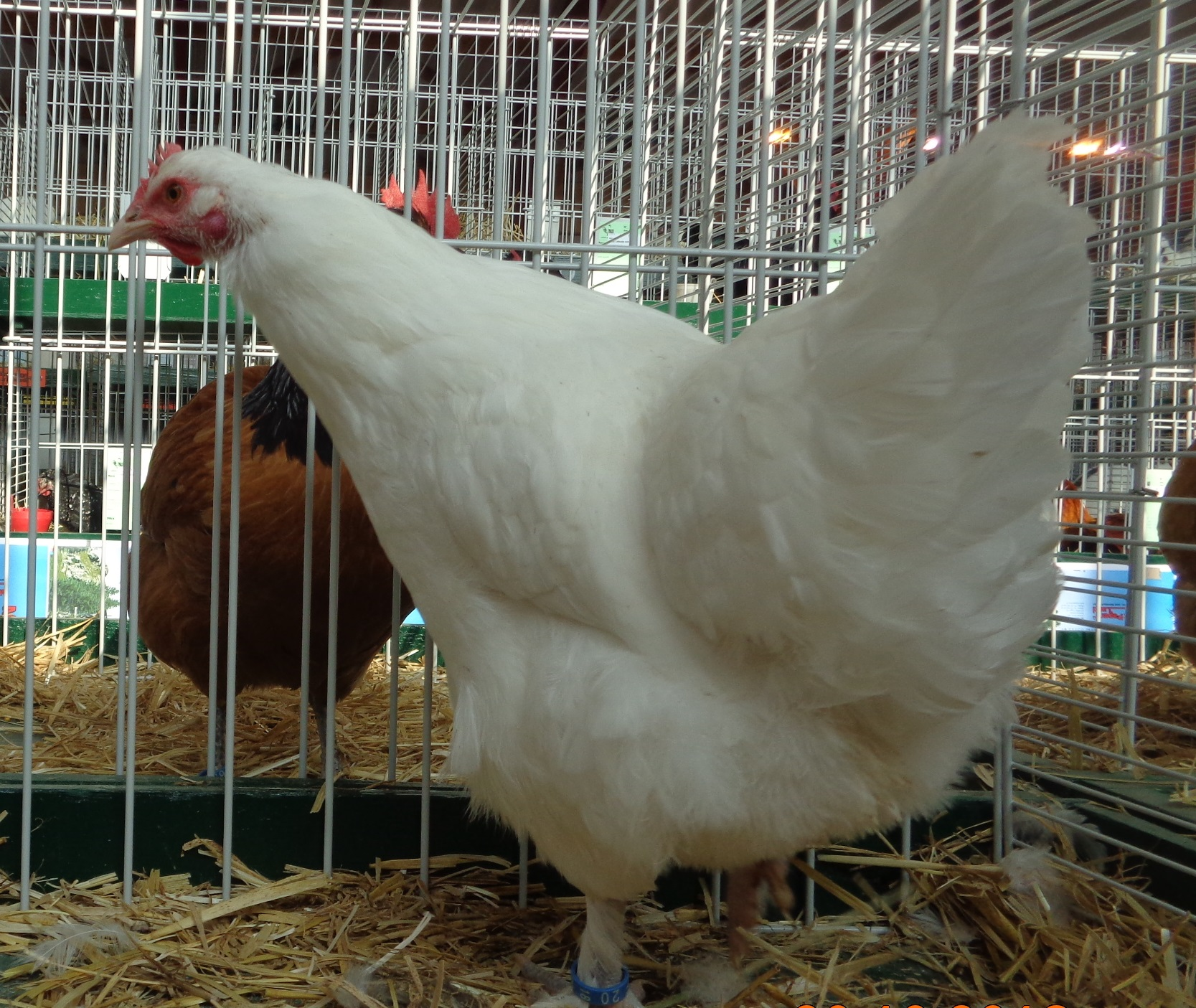
White hen

Ten colours are recognised in the French breed standard for large fowl: white, wheaten, silver cuckoo, golden cuckoo, black, copper-black, silver-black, copper-blue, black-tailed buff and Columbian. Bantam colours are black, white, copper-black and silver cuckoo. Fourteen colours are listed by the Entente Européenne. The British type, with unfeathered legs, is not recognised in Europe. The Australian Poultry Standard recognises both feather- and clean-legged.

In the United Kingdom five colours are recognised: black, dark cuckoo, golden cuckoo and silver cuckoo, with unfeathered shanks; and copper-black, with feathered shanks.

The eyes are red or orange, the comb, face, earlobes and wattles are red. The shanks and the soles of the feet are usually greyish or pinkish white, depending on the plumage; the colour of the beak also depends on the plumage colour, and varies from pale horn to dark horn.

== Use ==
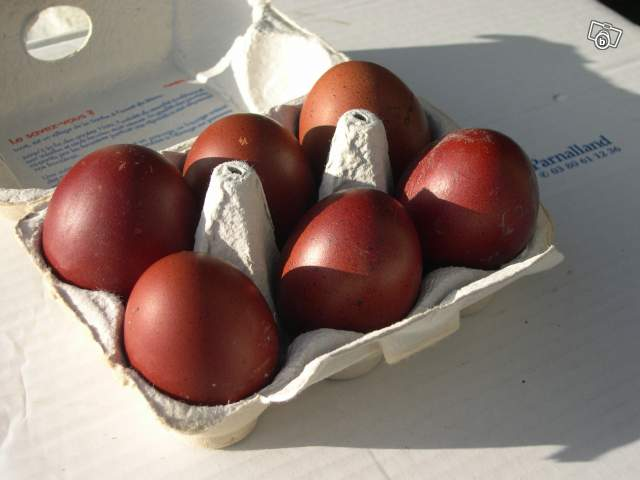
Marans eggs

It is a dual-purpose bird, reared both for its dark brown eggs and for its table qualities.
