= Brugse Vechter =

Belgian breed of fighting chicken

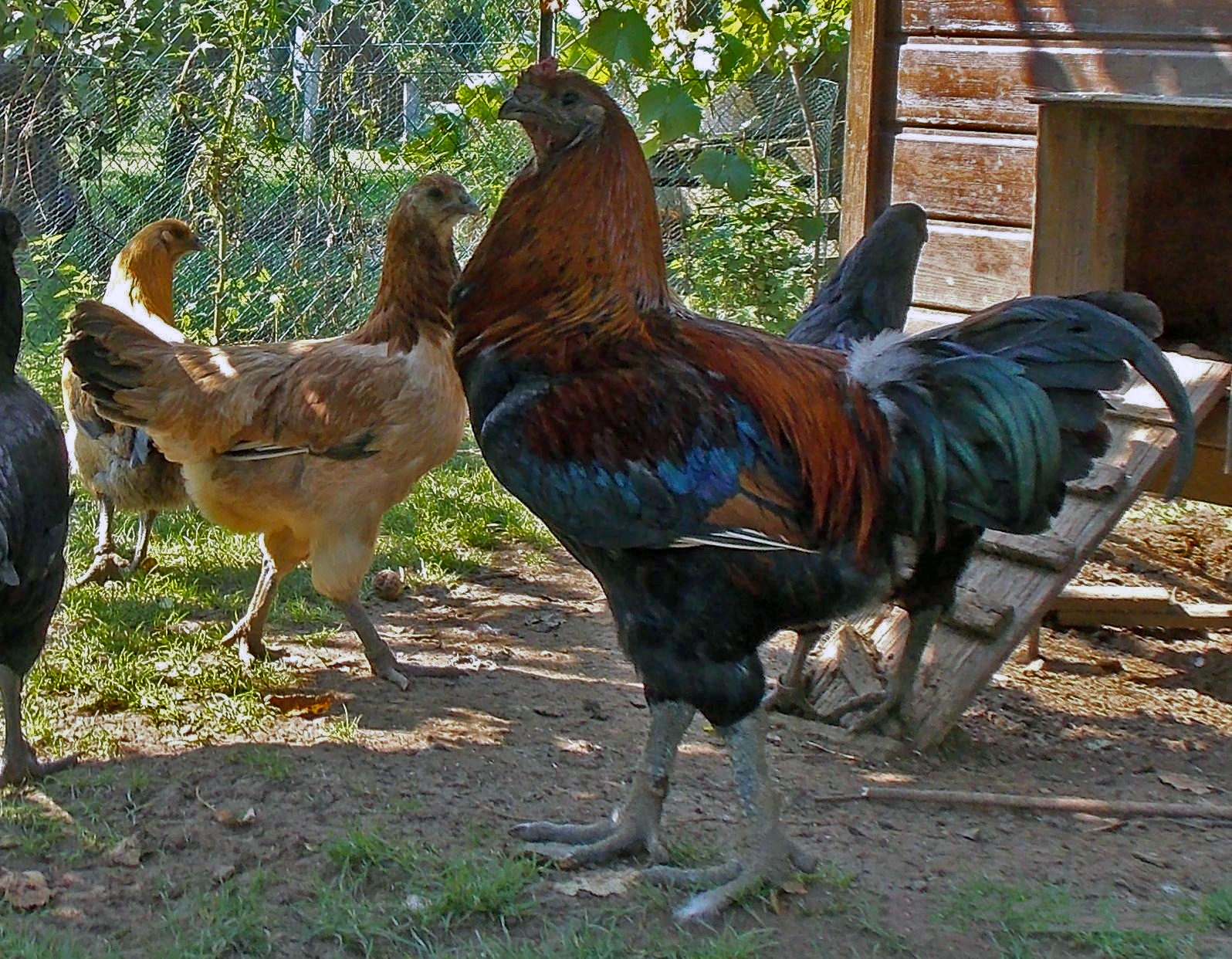
- Cock and hens
- Conservation status: endangered
- Other names: French: Combattant de Bruges
- Country of origin: Belgium
- Distribution: Flanders
- Use: cock-fighting

Traits
- Weight: Male: 5.0–5.5 kg; Female: 4.0 kg
- Egg colour: cream-coloured
- Comb type: triple

Classification
- EE: yes
- Chicken; Gallus gallus domesticus

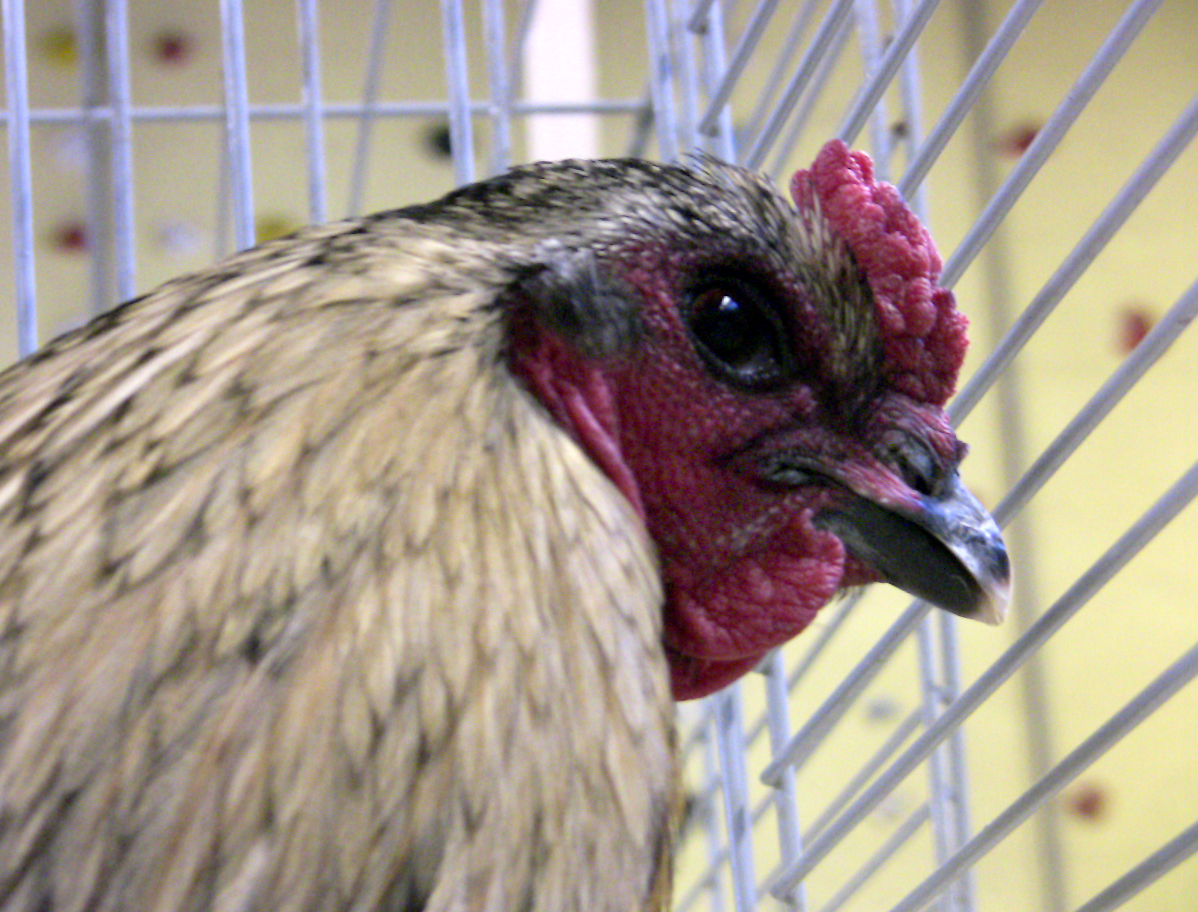
Head of a cock

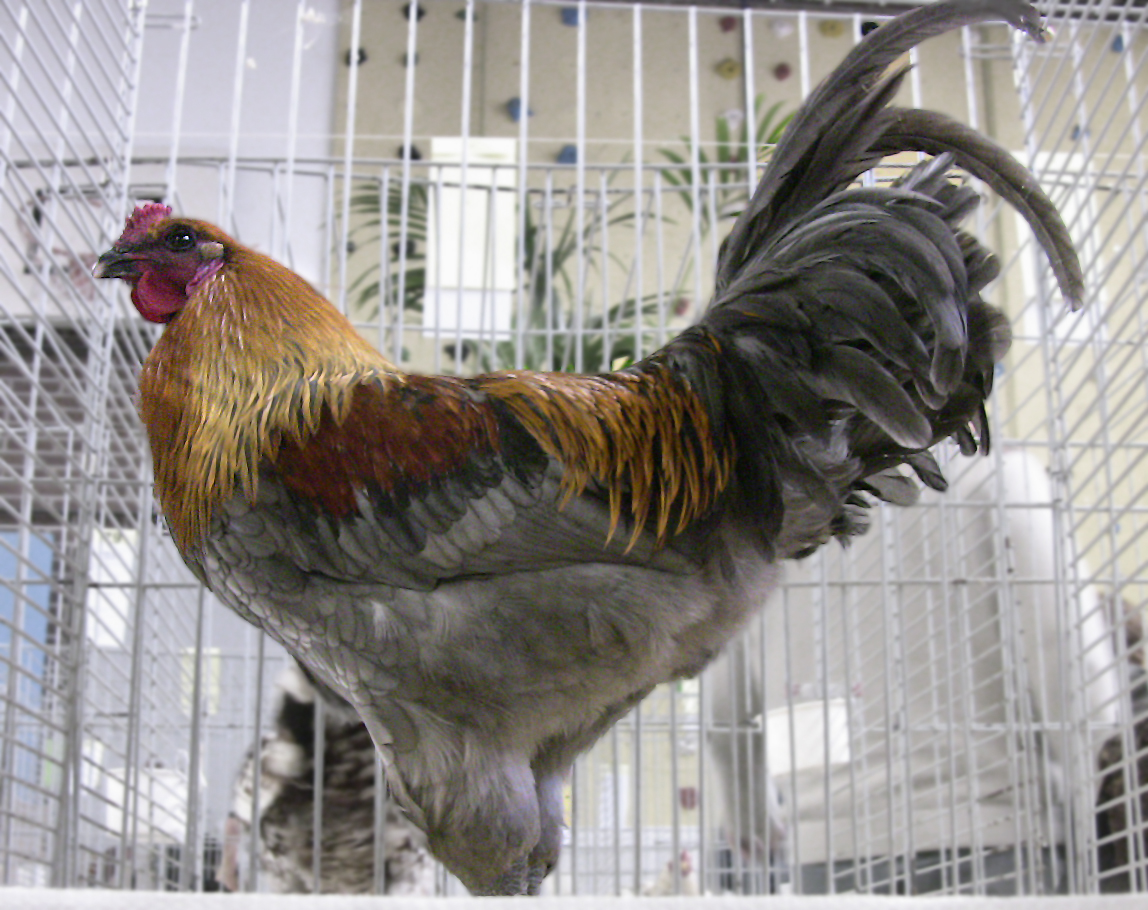
Blue-red (blue golden-salmon) colouring

The Brugse Vechter, French: Combattant de Bruges, is an endangered Belgian breed of gamecock. It dates from the early nineteenth century, and was bred specifically for cock-fighting. It named for its area of origin, that of the city of Bruges (Brugge), in West Flanders in the north-east of Belgium. It is one of three Belgian breeds of fighting-cock, the others being the Luikse Vechter and the Tiense Vechter. It is a hardy breed, but the birds are often aggressive; those reared for exhibition may show less aggression.

== History ==
The Brugse Vechter is the oldest of the three Belgian fighting-cock breeds. It originated in western Flanders in the early years of the nineteenth century, and was formerly common throughout Belgium. It was first mentioned as la race de Bruges ("the Bruges breed") in 1858. The first breed standard was drawn up in 1908. The other fighting breeds, the Luikse Vechter from the area of Liège in Wallonia, and the Tiense Vechter from the area of Tienen in Flemish Brabant, both derive from it.

The Brugse Vechter is endangered in Belgium. In 2010 there were approximately 200 birds, almost all of which were in Flanders.

A bantam Brugse Vechter was bred in the second part of the twentieth century. The plumage colours are superior to those of the full-sized breed. It is critically endangered in Belgium. Some are reared in Germany and in the Netherlands.

== Characteristics ==
The Brugse Vechter is a large, powerful and aggressive bird. For this reason, cocks and hens may need to be kept separately. Strains reared exclusively for exhibition may show less aggression.

The back is flat, is as broad as it is long, and is almost horizontal; the other Belgian gamecock breeds have a sloping back. The face is deeply pigmented, and may vary from purplish-red to almost black. The comb is small and triple; the legs are thick and strong, and are slate-blue. Seventeen plumage colours are recognised.

== Use ==
The Brugse Vechter was bred for its fighting ability. Cock-fighting is against the law in Belgium, and practitioners of the sport usually travel to northern France. Some strains are reared only for exhibition at poultry shows.

The Brugse Vechter is a better layer than many fighting breeds. Hens lay about 150 cream-coloured eggs per year, with a weight of 65–75 g> They are not good sitters. The meat is fine-textured and of good flavour.
