= Ardennaise =

Belgian/French breed of chicken

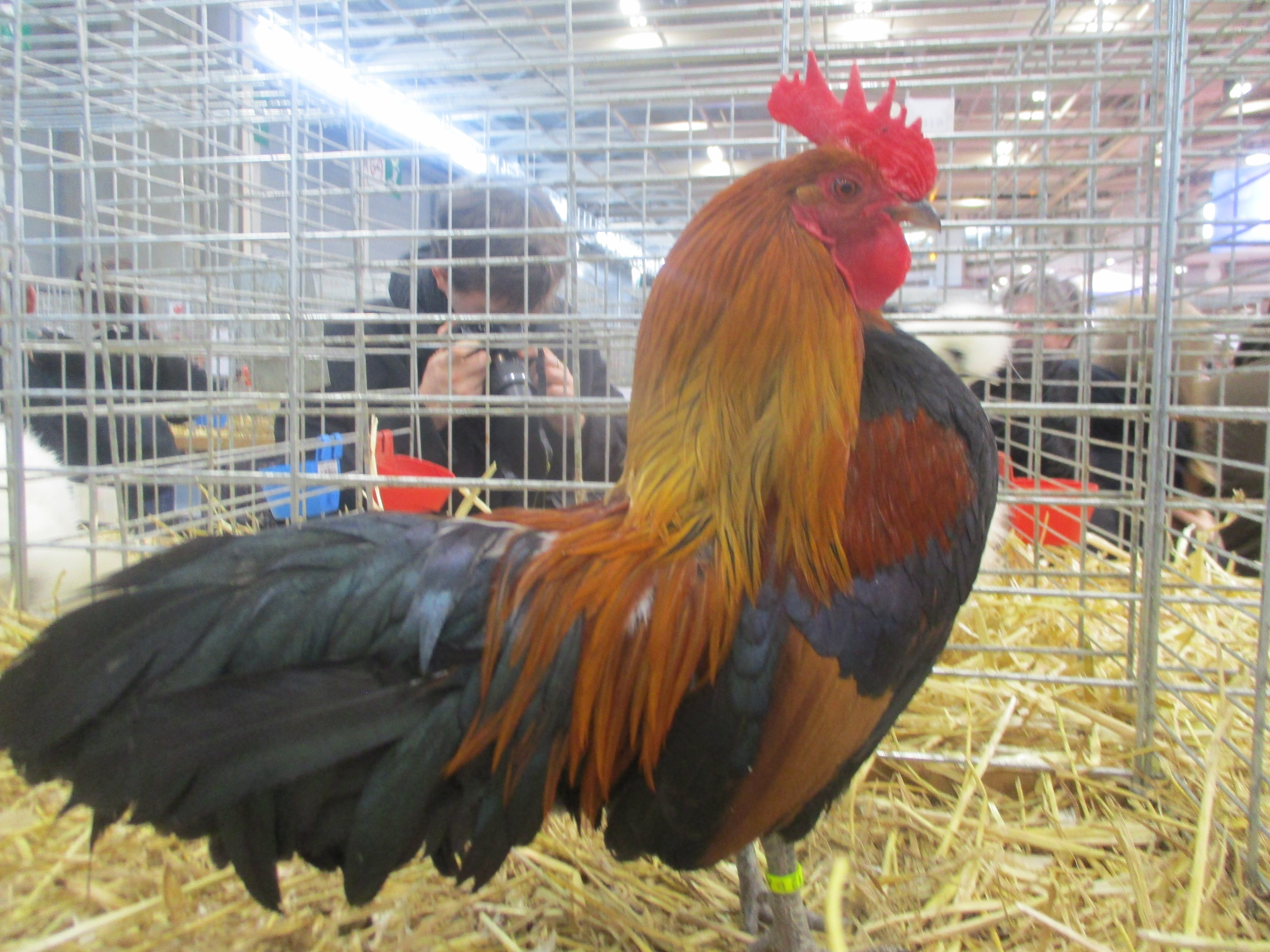
- Bantam cock at the Salon international de l'agriculture in Paris, 2018
- Conservation status: FAO (2007): endangered; DAD-IS (2025): unknown
- Other names: Dutch: Ardenner; Dutch: Ardense hoen; Dutch: Ardenner bolstaart; French: Poule ardennaise; French: Sans-queue des Ardennes
- Country of origin: Belgium; France
- Distribution: Ardennes
- Use: dual-purpose, eggs and meat

Traits
- Weight: Male: 1.75–2.5 kg; Female: 1.5–1.75 kg
- Comb type: single comb

Classification
- APA: not listed
- EE: yes
- PCGB: not listed
- Chicken; Gallus gallus domesticus

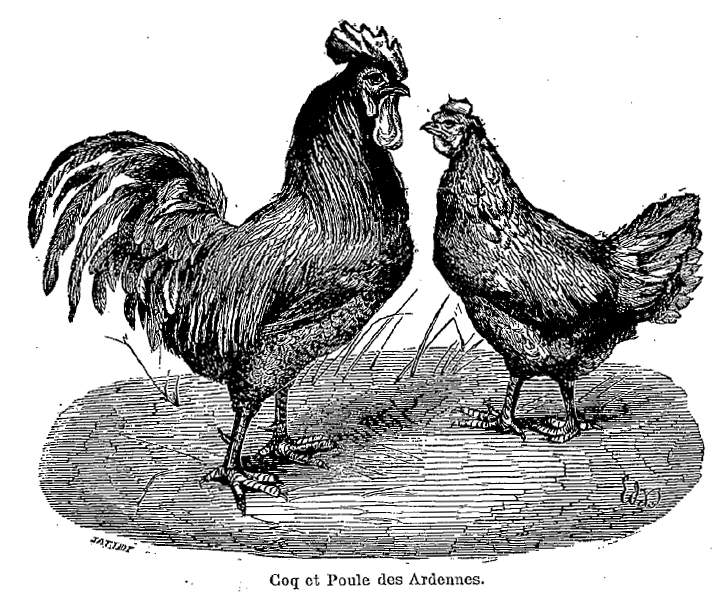
Engraving of an Ardennaise cock and hen, from Victor La Perre de Roo, Monographie des races de poules (1882)

The Ardennaise or Poule Ardennaise (Note: French pronunciation: [pul aʁdənɛz, -dɛnɛz]) is a French and Belgian breed of domestic chicken from the Ardennes plateau, in Belgium and eastern France. Its range extends from the Pays de Herve in Wallonia to the French département of Ardennes, and includes the Fagnes, the Famenne, and the valleys of the Amblève, the Ourthe and the Semois.

== History ==
The Ardennaise is a traditional breed of the Ardennes region. The first description is that of Victor La Perre de Roo in 1882, at a time when the breed was already becoming rarer. A poultry breeders' club, the Union Avicole de Liége, was formed in 1893, and under its protection the Ardennaise enjoyed almost thirty years of success. Following the First World War, mass importations from Italy of yellow-legged birds – with much higher laying abilities – were a new threat. Selective breeding of the Ardennaise for better laying ability began in 1922, with some success. However, the Ardennaise was also cross-bred with Leghorn stock, resulting in a further decline. By 1940 there was no remaining trace of the breed. It was reconstituted over a period of about thirty years after the Second World War. In 2009 the total population was estimated at well over 2000.

A bantam Ardennaise was created in Liège in the space of five or six years from 1904. It was shown from 1907, and the standard was approved in 1913.

A tail-less variant, sometimes treated as a separate breed, the Dutch: Ardenner Bolstaart or French: Sans-queue des Ardennes, is identical to the standard breed in all respects, except for the absence of the coccygeal bone and the tail, caused by the dominant Rp gene. Both the Sans-queue and its tail-less bantam variant are critically endangered. In 2025 the conservation status of both the standard and the tail-less Ardennaise was unknown.

== Characteristics ==
The Ardennaise is genetically close to the Bresse Gauloise. Twelve colours are recognised by the Entente Européenne.

== Use ==
In a year an Ardennaise hen lays approximately 180 white eggs weighing 36–57 g, with an average weight of 52 g (2 oz).
