= Coucou des Flandres =

Belgian breed of chicken

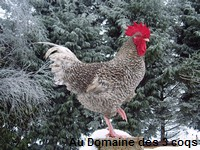
- Conservation status: Belgium: FAO (2007): critical; 2012: critical; DAD-IS (2025): unknown; France: FAO (2007): critical; DAD-IS (2025): unknown
- Other names: Dutch: Vlaamse Koekoek; French: Poulet de Dendre
- Country of origin: Belgium, France
- Distribution: Flanders, Picardy

Traits
- Weight: Male: 3.0–3.5 kg; Female: 2.5–3.0 kg
- Egg colour: cream-coloured
- Comb type: single

Classification
- EE: yes
- Chicken; Gallus gallus domesticus

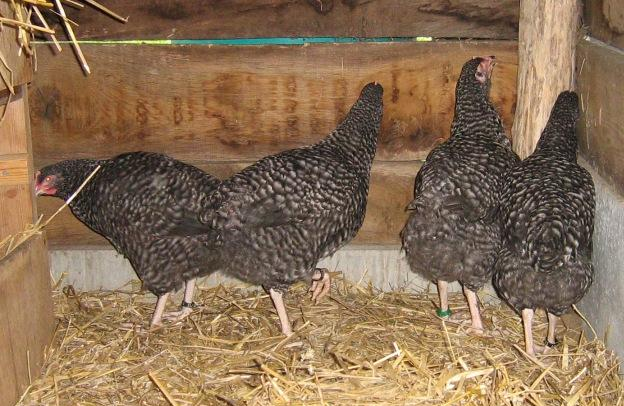
Hens

The Coucou des Flandres, Dutch: Vlaamse Koekoek, is an endangered Belgian breed of domestic chicken. It may have a common origin with the Malines from the area of Mechelen (French: Malines), in the province of Antwerp in Flanders, or may indeed represent the original type of that breed before it was cross-bred in the nineteenth century with various different types of imported Oriental chicken. By the time of the First World War it had disappeared; it was re-created in the years before the Second World War. It is critically endangered in Belgium, but more numerous in Picardy in France. It may also be known as the Poulet de Dendre, for the Dender river in its area of origin.

== History ==
The origins of the Coucou des Flandres are unknown. It may have existed for hundreds of years. It is apparently related to the Malines from the area of Mechelen (French: Malines), in the province of Antwerp in Flanders. It may perhaps represent the original type of the Malines breed before it was cross-bred in the nineteenth century with various different types of imported Oriental chicken including birds brought from Shanghai to the zoological gardens of Antwerp, as well as Brahma, Langshan and Cochin birds.

The breed had disappeared by the time of the First World War, but was re-created in the years before the Second World War. It is critically endangered in Belgium, where in 2005 a census found only 53 birds. It is more numerous in northern Picardy in France.

== Characteristics ==
The Coucou des Flandres has only one plumage variety, the cuckoo. The comb is single; the legs are pinkish-white and unfeathered.

== Use ==
Hens lay about 150 cream-coloured eggs per year, with a weight of about 60 g. They are good mothers and good sitters.
