= Belgian Bantam =

Breed of chicken

- Conservation status: FAO (2007): no data; Moula (2012): in danger of extinction; DAD-IS (2025): unknown
- Other names: Dutch: Belgisch kriel; French: Naine belge; French: Belge naine
- Country of origin: Belgium

Traits
- Weight: Male: 650 g; Female: 550 g

Classification
- EE: yes
- PCGB: not listed
- Chicken; Gallus gallus domesticus

The Belgian Bantam, Dutch: Belgisch kriel, French: Naine belge, is a breed of bantam chicken from Belgium. It is a true bantam, and has no full-sized counterpart; cocks weigh about 650 grams and hens about 550 g. It is in danger of extinction; in 2010 a total of 168 birds were counted in the whole of Belgium. Fourteen colour patterns are recognised in the European standard.

Regarding the Belgian bantam, some confusion may arise from the name. The term "Belgian Bantam" refers to a specific breed in its own right. However, it is also commonly used as a general term for all bantam breeds originating from Belgium. These include: the Antwerp Bearded Bantam, Ardenner Rumpless Bantam, Ardenner Bantam, Bassette, Belgian Bantam, Bosvoorde Bearded Bantam, Tournai Bantam, Everberg Bearded Bantam, Yellow of Mehaigne, Grubbe Bearded Bantam, Uccle Bearded Bantam, Waas Bantam, Watermaal Bearded Bantam, Brabant Bantam, Brakel Bantam, Famenne Bantam, Herve Bantam, Bruges Game Bantam, Liège Game Bantam, and Tienen Game Bantam.

== History ==
Like the Dutch Bantam and the French Pictave, the Belgian Bantam derives from the widespread European population of small partridge-coloured bantams which in Flemish were known as Engelse kiekskes, "English bantams". From about 1900 these were selectively bred in the area of Liège, in Wallonia. Two distinct bantam breeds were developed, the Belgian Bantam and the Bassette Liégeoise. The Belgian Bantam breed standard was not drawn up until 1934.

The Belgian Bantam is distributed mainly in Flanders, with a few in Wallonia and in the Netherlands. It is rare and at risk of extinction; in 2010 a total of 168 birds were counted in the whole of Belgium.

== Characteristics ==
The Belgian Bantam is very similar to the Dutch Bantam, but is slightly larger. It is nevertheless among the smallest bantam breeds, with cocks weighing about 650 grams and hens about 550 g. It is small and alert. The comb is single, and the legs are slate-blue.

Fourteen colour patterns are listed in the European standard for the breed, of which thirteen are officially recognised in Belgium. Partridge is the colour most commonly seen; the partridge variant colours are rare, and the other colours extremely rare.

== Use ==
Belgian Bantam hens are good layers of small white eggs weighing 30–35 g. They are good sitters and good mothers.
