= Dwarfism in chickens =

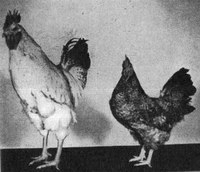
Dwarfism due to the sex-linked recessive gene dw. Comparative size of two full-sib roosters. Left: Normal sibling (genotype Dw/dw). Right: Dwarf sibling (genotype dw/dw).

Dwarfism in chickens is an inherited condition found in chickens consisting of a significant delayed growth, resulting in adult individuals with a distinctive small size in comparison with normal specimens of the same breed or population.

The affected birds show no signs of dwarfism in the first weeks of age. Differences in size due to dwarfism appear slow and progressively along the growing stage. Poultry breeders begin to distinguish gradually dwarfs from normal birds by their shortest shanks and smallest body size. Depending on the breed, most types of dwarfism in chickens begin to be recognized when the birds reach 8–10 weeks of age, but classification is more precise when the chickens are five months old or more. At this point differences between normal and dwarf siblings is evident in all males and in 98% of the females. Dwarfs chickens reach sexual maturity and reproduce normally.

Dwarfism in chickens has been found to be controlled by several simple genetic factors. Some types are autosomic while others are sex-linked, but when poultry breeders make reference to 'dwarf chickens' they usually refer implicitly to sex-linked recessive dwarfism due to the recessive gene dw, located on the Z chromosome.

As sex-linked dwarf broiler breeder hens can produce normal sized broiler chickens, sex-linked recessive dwarfism has gained some acceptance in the poultry industry since the last decades of the 20th century. These hens require less food and less housing space. Their feed intake does not need to be restricted. They are more tolerant of heat (see: Advantages...). Sex-linked dwarf broiler female parent stocks reduce costs, improve animal welfare and economic efficiency in the European broiler industry (see: Use of...). However, their use is not widespread in the broiler industry.

== Autosomal types of dwarfism ==
Two different types of autosomal dwarfisms have been found in chickens. These types of dwarfism are controlled by genes located on the autosomal chromosomes so inherits the same way in both sexes.

=== Thyrogenous dwarfism, td ===
In 1929 a type of dwarfism was described in different breeds of Rhode Island Red chickens. This type of dwarfism produced individuals which showed a general growth delay, which was recognizable since two or three weeks of age. The outer toe was curved backwards. The skull was high and wide in relation to its length and the upper beak was curved downwards. The tongue was shortened and tumescent. The legs were shortened, more in the metatarsal than in the femur. The condition was potentially fatal. None of the affected birds reached sexual maturity. It was considered the result of a dysfunction of the thyroid gland, similar to the human pathological condition known as myxoedema infantilis. Dwarfs of this type were homozygotes for an autosomal recessive gene td (thyrogenous dwarfism).

=== Autosomal dwarfism, adw ===
Another body size mutation was found in the experimental Cornell K-strain of chickens. Body size was reduced by about 30% and the affected birds were recognizable by 6 to 8 weeks of age. Their sexual maturity was somewhat delayed and rate of lay was about 90% that of the K-strain. Viability of the carriers was good but hatchability was poor. The condition was due to an autosomal recessive gene designed adw.

The ultimate goal of the modern genetic studies is to find out the underlying genes involved in these traits. To achieve this, the so-called positional candidate gene approach is gaining in importance. This approach is based on the genetic localization of a trait using genetic linkage analysis. Subsequent comparative mapping of the trait locus with the gene-rich maps of the human and the mouse may reveal candidate genes for the trait in question. Comparative mapping revealed that autosomal dwarfism in the chicken (adw) is located in a chromosomal region that is conserved between chicken, human and mouse. In the mouse the phenotype "Pygmy", similar to chicken adw is also located in that region. The Pygmy mouse phenotype arises from the inactivation of the High Mobility Group I-C (HMGCI-C). In the human the HMGCI-C gene is also located in the same conserved chromosomal segment. Fluorescent in situ hybridization of chicken metaphase chromosomes using the chicken HMGI-C gene as a probe, showed that the chicken HMGI-C gene is indeed located in the region of the adw locus. Insulin-like growth factor 1 (IGF1) is another candidate for adw in the chicken.

== Sex-linked dwarfism ==
In birds, female is the heterogametic sex, that is, it has one Z and one W sexual chromosome (genotype ZW), while male (the homogametic sex) carries two Z chromosomes (genotype ZZ). Thus, reciprocal crosses between normal and dwarf specimens may give rather different results.

=== Sex-linked recessive dwarfism, dw ===
Hutt studied in the 1940s a remarkable type of dwarfism caused by only one sex-linked recessive gene to which he assigned the symbol dw.

This mutation reduces body weight in females by 26 to 32%, but the effect is still greater in homozygous males, by about 42–43%. Chicks are normal size. This is the best studied type of dwarfism in chickens. Sex-linked dwarfism in meat type breeds are first recognized by the shortening of the shanks than by the lowering body weight in the rearing period

There are no signs of sex-linked dwarfism in the first weeks of age. Some individuals can be identified as dwarfs at 8–10 weeks of age, but classification is more precise when the chickens are five months old or more. At this point differences between normal and dwarf sibs is evident in all males and in 98% of the females. These dwarfs reach sexual maturity and reproduce normally.

Normal females are always of genotype Dw/-, while dwarf females are always of genotype dw/-, because female is the heterogametic sex having only one Z chromosome. That is, females carrying a sex-linked gene of dwarfism are always pure and exhibit the trait. On the other hand, normal males may be either homozygous Dw/Dw or heterozygous Dw/dw, but dwarf males are always homozygous dw/dw.

Double dose of dwarf gene causes the dwarfism to be much more evident in males than in females. The above picture illustrates the comparative size of two full-sib roosters born the same day: Left: Normal sibling of genotype Dw/dw. Right: Dwarf sibling of genotype dw/dw.

==== Hormonal causes of dwarfism ====
Among the main factors involved in growth regulation, thyroid hormones tiroxine (T4) triiodothyronine (T3), growth hormone (GH), and its related growth factor, Insulin-like growth factor-I (IGF-I), were the most studied in dwarfs.

Sex-linked dwarf chickens are characterized by low circulating levels of T3 and IGF-I in spite of normal or even increased levels of T4 and GH. The T3 deficiency is explained by a lower peripheral activity of T4 monodeiodination which could be related to an abnormal T4 uptake by the cell, particularly the hepatocyte. The low production of IGF-I could be related to a deficient GH receptor, as suggested by the decreased GH binding observed in the liver of dwarf birds. Both T3 and IGF-I synthesis may share common pathways since thyroidectomy also decreases IGF-I level while a GH injection stimulates the T4 to T3 monodeiodination in the normal embryo but not in the dwarf. Further studies are needed on the GH receptor and the T4 uptake in the hepatic cell to identify the common point where the dwarf gene could act. Ovulation rate and lipomobilisation are decreased in adult dwarfs but these findings are not yet easily related to the endocrinological changes observed during growth

Administration of triiodothyronine (T3) in the diet, from day of hatch until 8 weeks of age, to sex-linked dwarf chickens stimulates growth but can not fully restore a normal growth rate.

Sex-linked dwarfism in chickens is a form of growth hormone resistance that resembles the Laron syndrome in humans, characterized by reductions in stature and plasma insulin-like growth factor-I (IGF-I) levels.

Variants in chicken growth hormone receptor (GHR) gene lead to sex-linked dwarf chickens, but effects of different variants are distinct.

=== Bantam dwarfism, dw^{B} ===
Bantam dwarfism is a variety of dwarfism existing in many breeds of bantam chickens. Bantam chickens are also called miniatures. These birds are popular as pets, but Bantam hens are also renowned for hatching and brooding because they are very protective mothers and will attack anything that gets near their young.

The reciprocal crosses made between normal sized chickens with Bantams revealed that Bantams carry one or several sex-linked dominant genes that reduce body size. This mutation is present in Sebright Bantams and probably other bantams. This mutation is thought to be an allele at the Dw locus and to be different from the allele dw.

In genetics, the common convention is that most dominant alleles are written as capital letters and recessive alleles as lower-case letters (see: Dominance (genetics)). In spite of this, literature refers to the gene of Bantam dwarfism with the lower-case symbol dw^{B}.

=== MacDonald dwarfism, dw^{M} ===
A second type of sex-linked recessive dwarfism was found in a sex-linked dwarf chicken population. This mutation is thought to be an allele or the Dw locus and to be different from the dw allele. This conclusion is based on the fact that males heterozygous for dw^{M}/dw produce female offspring which fall into two populations with respect to shank length. The evidence is inconclusive as to whether this allele is different or the same as the dw^{B} allele.

Up to the present level of knowledge the dominance order of the alleles of locus Dw is: dw^{B} > Dw > dw.

In other words, allele dw^{B} for Bantam dwarfism is dominant over the normal allele Dw, and the last is dominant over the sex-linked recessive allele dw. The existence of a second recessive allele has not yet been confirmed.

== Use of sex-linked dwarfism in poultry industry ==
Sex-linked recessive dwarfism found application in poultry industry in the last decades of the 20th century. The application in broiler production is based on the known fact that dwarf female parents give 100% normal progeny when they are mated with normal male parents. The resulting progeny males are 100% heterozygotes Dw/dw and the females are hemizygotes Dw/-.

In commercial broiler chicken production the use of dwarf female parents acquired a great importance. Nowadays, the majority of broiler breeders in Europe are the standard, fast growing genotype, but 18–20% of the broiler breeders are dwarf parental females that produce standard and alternative (medium or slow growing) broilers. The use of dwarfism also found application in commercial egg production. Dwarf Leghorn layers need less housing space, so the main advantage is to allow a more efficient use of housing space producing more eggs per unit of surface, but the smallest size of their eggs imposes a serious drawback to this purpose.

=== Advantages of broiler breeder hens ===
Under current practice, normal parent poultry breeding stock potentially face welfare problems. Intensive selection for production traits, especially growth rate, is associated with increased nutritious requirement and thus feed consumption, but also reproductive dysfunctions and decreased sexual activity in broiler breeders. A first resulting serious welfare problem is the subsequent severe feed restriction which is applied during rearing, in order to prevent health problems and to reach better egg production. This severe feed restriction has negative effects on bird welfare as it causes chronic stress resulting from hunger. The use of normal fast growing broiler breeder hens require dedicated programmes of feed restriction, both to maximise egg and chick production and secondly to avoid metabolic disorders and mortality in broiler breeders. The negative correlation between muscle growth and reproduction effectiveness is known as the "broiler breeder paradox". Using dwarf broiler breeder hens is a good alternative, because dwarf hens combine relatively good reproductive fitness with ad libitum feeding.

With respect to bird welfare the use of slow growing birds is a viable alternative to reduce the negative effects of feed restriction. Dwarf broiler breeders do not need to be (severely) feed restricted. The resulting male progeny grow as fast as progeny from normal female parents. The use of female broiler female parent breeders improves feed efficiency and allows a reduction of feed costs up to 33%. They take up 20–30% less housing space and have more tolerance to heat. Comparative performance tests proved that these are important advantages in tropical environments.

== See also ==
- Bantam (poultry)
- Broiler
- Chicken
- Dwarfism
- Heterogametic sex
- Laron syndrome
- Sex linkage
- ZW sex-determination system
