= Bassette Liégeoise =

Belgian breed of chicken

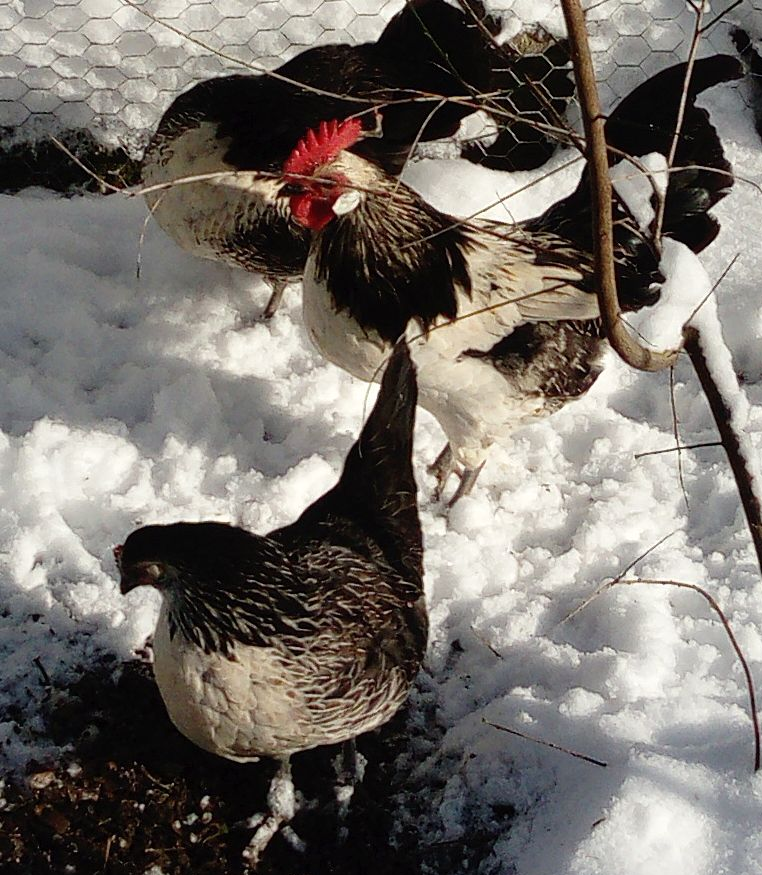
- Cock and hens

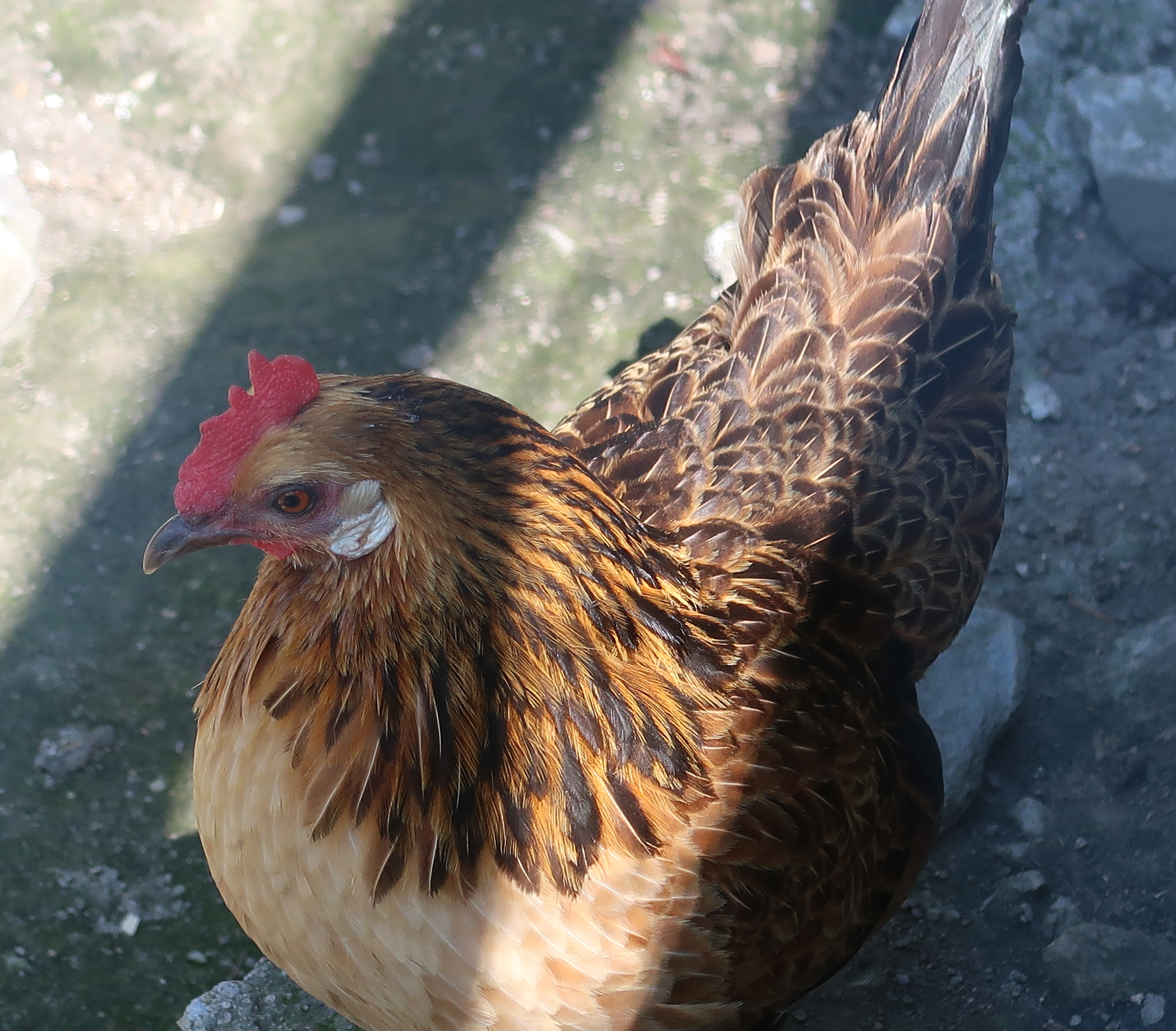
- A hen
- Conservation status: FAO (2007): endangered; Moula (2012): in danger; DAD-IS (2025): unknown
- Other names: Bassette
- Country of origin: Belgium
- Distribution: Flanders, Wallonia

Traits
- Weight: Male: 1000 g; Female: 900 g
- Colour: eighteen recognised colours

Classification
- EE: yes
- PCGB: not listed
- Chicken; Gallus gallus domesticus

The Bassette Liégeoise (Note: French pronunciation: [basɛt ljeʒwaz]) or Bassette is a Belgian breed of large bantam chicken. It is a true bantam – it does not derive from a corresponding breed of large fowl. It is larger than most bantams, but considerably smaller than full-sized breeds; cocks weigh about 1000 g and hens about 900 g. Like most Belgian bantam breeds, it is in danger of extinction. Eighteen colour patterns are officially recognised, of which many are rare.

== History ==
Like the Belgian Bantam, the Bassette Liégeoise derives from the widespread European population of small partridge-coloured bantams which in Flemish were known as Engelse kiekskes, "English bantams". In the nineteenth century there was in the area of Liège, in Wallonia, a variable type of small chicken known by regional name bassette, "little chicken", which was thought to derive from inter-breeding of these bantams with local chicken breeds. It was valued for hatching partridge and pheasant eggs. From about 1917 William Collier of Brussels started to selectively breed these for consistent characteristics and for egg-laying capacity. A breed standard was drawn up in 1930 and was approved in 1932.

The Bassette Liégeoise is distributed both in Flanders and in Wallonia; some are found in France, in Germany and in the Netherlands. Like most Belgian bantam breeds, it is rare and at risk of extinction.

The total population was reported in 2013 to number 47 birds; no data has since been reported. In 2025 the conservation status of the breed was unknown.

== Characteristics ==
The Bassette Liégeoise is larger than most bantams, but smaller than full-sized breeds; cocks weigh about 1000 g and hens about 900 g. It is nevertheless considered a bantam breed. The comb is single, the earlobes are white, and the beak and legs are slate-blue.

Eighteen colour patterns are officially recognised in Belgium. Quail and silver quail are most often seen; partridge is less common, and the other colours are rare or perhaps extinct.

== Use ==
Bassette Liégeoise hens are good layers, and may lay from 125 to 180 eggs per year; the eggs weigh some 42–48 g. The hens are good sitters and good mothers.
