= Malines chicken =

Breed of chicken

Malines
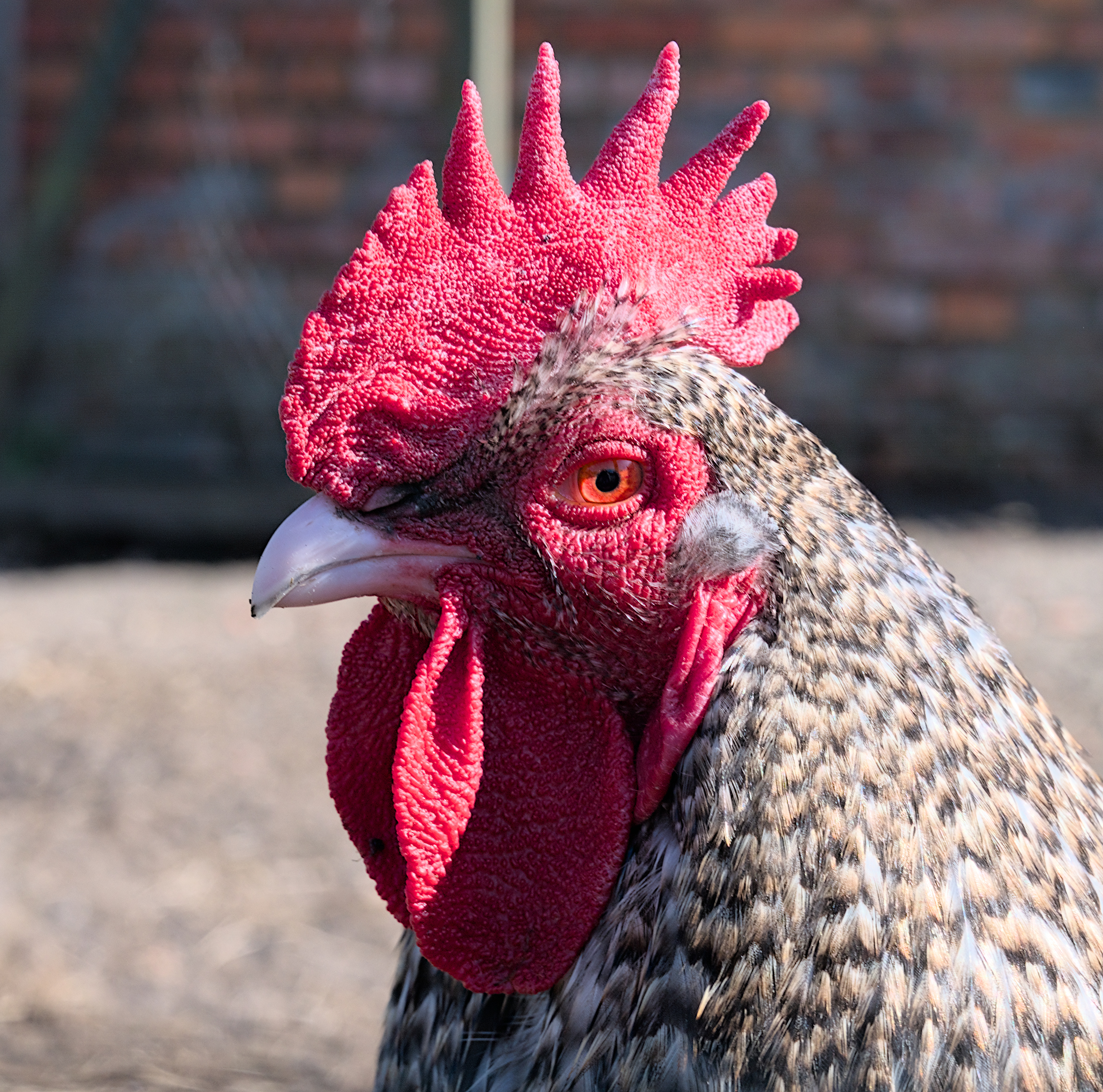
- Cock bird
- Conservation status: endangered
- Other names: Dutch: Mechelse Koekoek; Coucou de Malines; Mechelse Hoen; Poularde de Bruxelles; Poulet de Bruxelles
- Country of origin: Belgium
- Distribution: nationwide

Traits
- Weight: Male: 5 kg; Female: 4–4.5 kg
- Skin colour: white
- Egg colour: tinted
- Comb type: single

Classification
- EE: yes
- PCGB: soft feather, heavy
- Chicken; Gallus gallus domesticus

The Malines, Dutch: Mechelse Koekoek, is a Belgian breed of large domestic chicken. It originates from the area of Mechelen (French: Malines), in the province of Antwerp in Flanders, for which it is named. It was created in the nineteenth century by cross-breeding local cuckoo-patterned farm chickens with various different types of imported Oriental chicken. With the Jersey Giant, it is among the heaviest of all chicken breeds. It is valued for the quality of its meat, which is pale in colour and fine-textured.

== History ==
The Malines originates in the southern part of the province of Antwerp and the northern part of the province of Brabant, in eastern Flanders. It derives from cross-breeding of local cuckoo-patterned farm chickens with several of the various types of Oriental chicken that began to be imported to Europe in the nineteenth century. From about 1852, cuckoo-patterned local chickens were crossed with birds which had been brought from Shanghai, China, to the zoological gardens of Antwerp. Later, Brahma, Langshan and Cochin birds were also used. The resulting birds had the large structure of the Oriental chickens, but retained the meat quality of the local stock. Selective breeding for type and colour began in 1891, and in 1898 the Malines received official recognition.

In the early twentieth century the Malines became famous under the name "Poulet de Bruxelles", and was in great demand for the quality of its meat, which is white and finely textured. After the Second World War, when competition from imported specialised meat breeds became more intense, its popularity faded. In 2010 there were 575 breeding birds in Flanders.

A variant of the Malines, the Dutch: Mechelse Kalkoenkop or French: Malines à tête de dindon (roughly, "turkey-headed Malines") was created by cross-breeding with the Combattant de Bruges game breed. It has an unusual triple comb. It was created in the early twentieth century in response to demand from Germany for still heavier birds, and is heavier than the single-comb Malines. It is reported as a separate breed; in 2013 there were 88 in total.

A bantam Malines was independently developed by two breeders in 1990. It is not widespread.

== Characteristics ==
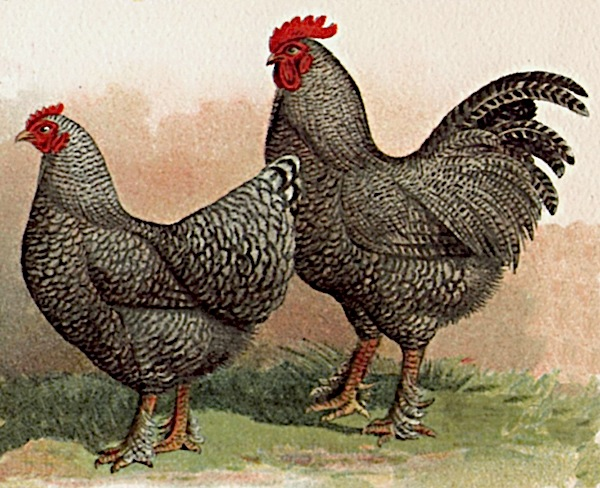
Malines cock and hen, illustration from circa 1900

The Malines is a massive bird, among the heaviest of all chicken breeds. The comb is usually single; the legs are pale and slightly feathered. In Belgium, eight colour varieties of plumage are recognised; in Germany there are nine.

== Use ==
The Malines is reared mainly for its meat, which is fine, pale, and close-textured. Hens lay about 140–160 tinted eggs per year, with a weight of about 65 g. They are good mothers and excellent sitters.
