= Barbu de Watermael =

Belgian breed of bantam chicken

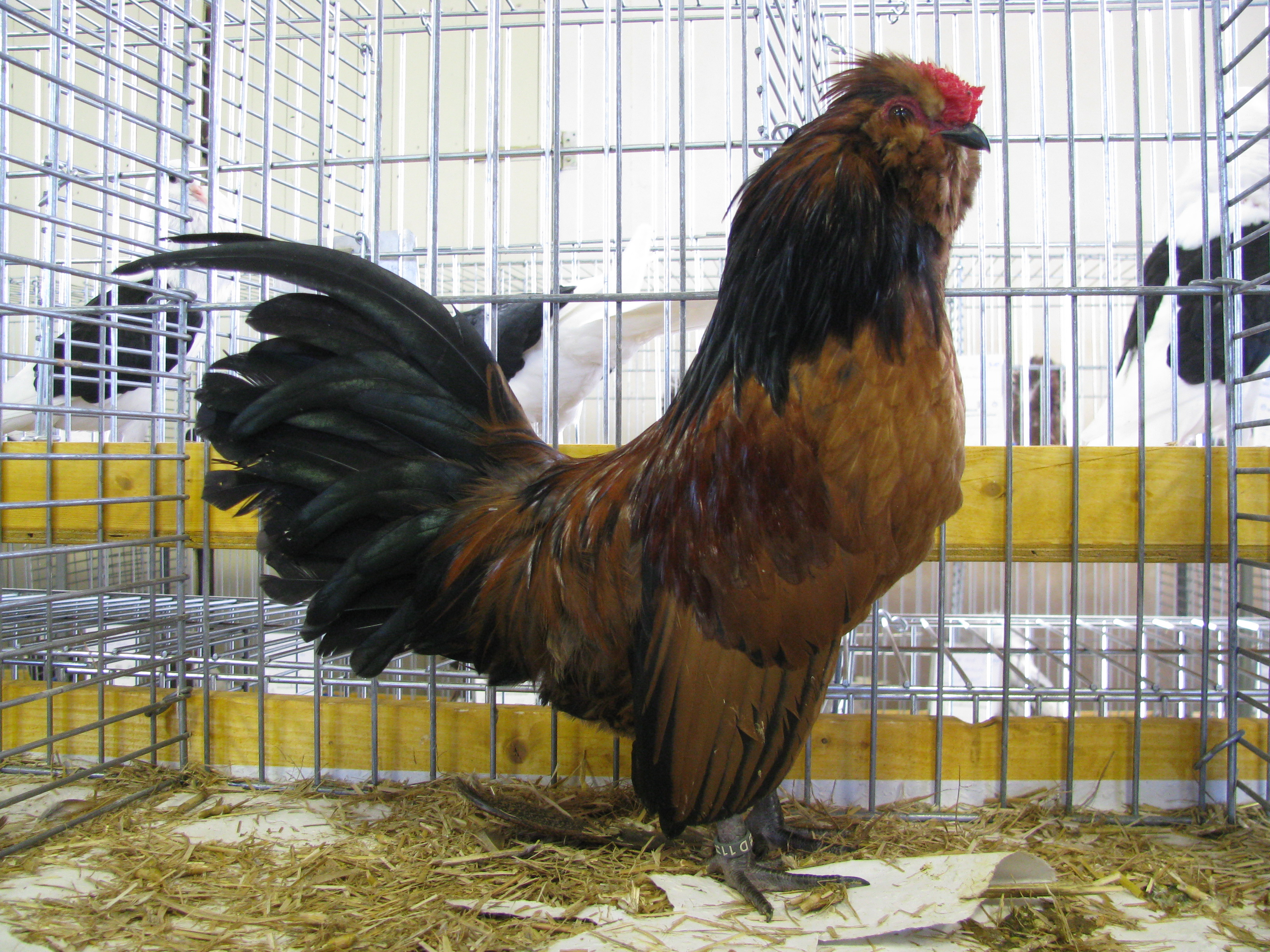
- Conservation status: endangered
- Other names: Watermaalse Baardkriel; Watermaal
- Country of origin: Belgium
- Use: fancy

Traits
- Weight: Male: 600–700 g; Female: 450–550 g
- Comb type: rose

Classification
- ABA: yes
- Chicken; Gallus gallus domesticus

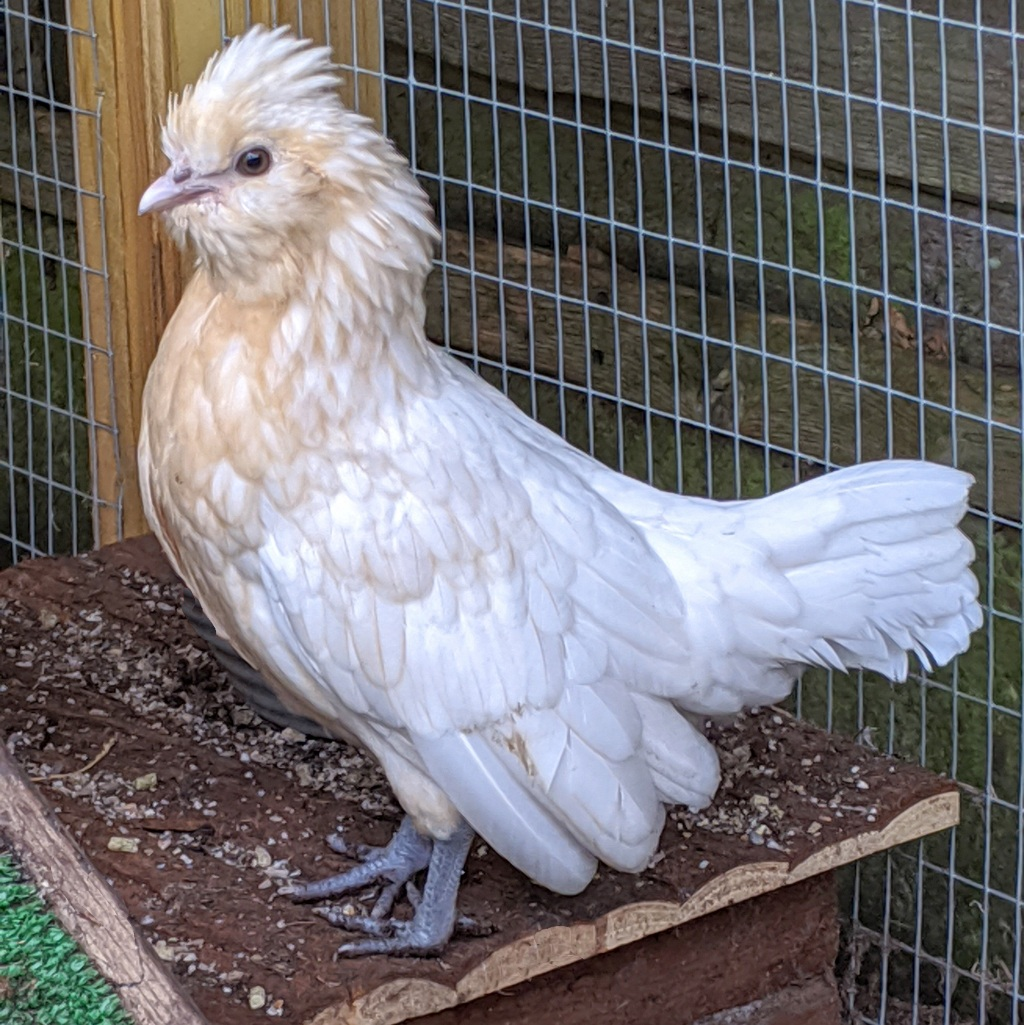
Juvenile female

The Barbu de Watermael (Note: meaning 'bearded [chicken] from Watermael') or Watermaalse Baardkriel is a Belgian breed of bantam chicken. It was bred in the early twentieth century in the Belgian town of Watermael-Boitsfort (Dutch: Watermaal-Bosvoorde), at that time in the Province of Brabant; the breed name derives from that of the town.

It is closely related to the Barbu d'Anvers, but is distinguished from it by its smaller size, its backswept crest of feathers and the three small spikes on its rose comb. The Barbu de Boitsfort is a rumpless variation, the only difference being that it lacks the uropygium, the part of the anatomy that carries the tail.

== History ==
The Barbu de Watermael is among the most recent of Belgian bantam breeds, but its origin is poorly documented. It was created by Antoine Dresse at the estate of La Fougères at Watermael-Boitsfort in the early years of the twentieth century, or, according to one source, in 1915. Neither Dresse nor his son Oscar ever revealed what breeds contributed to the creation of the Barbu de Watermael, though the contribution of the Barbu d'Anvers is considered certain. Oscar Dresse did say that the Poland had not been used; the cranial protuberance typical of that breed is considered a fault in the Barbu de Watermael. The birds were first shown in 1922, but did not achieve great popularity. A breeders' club was formed in France after the Second World War, and another, the Watermaalse Baardkrielclub, in the Netherlands in 1971.

In number, the Barbu de Watermael is the second bantam breed in Belgium, with a population of 764 in 2010; it was classed as "in danger" in that year.

== Characteristics ==
The Barbu de Watermael is in many respects similar to the Barbu d'Anvers, but is distinguished from it by its smaller size, its crest and the three small spikes on its rose comb. It is one of the smallest of all bantams: males weigh 600 to 700 g and hens 450 to 550 g. It has a narrow backswept crest, a trilobar beard and muff and a three-spiked rose comb. It is raised almost exclusively as an ornamental fowl. More than thirty colour varieties are recognised in Belgium. Those usually seen are black, brown red, buff Columbia, cuckoo, quail and white; the other colours are rare, and some are in the hands of only one breeder. In the United States it is recognised by the American Bantam Association as the Watermaal, in six colours: black, blue, buff, mottled, quail, and white.
