= Barbu de Boitsfort =

Belgian breed of chicken

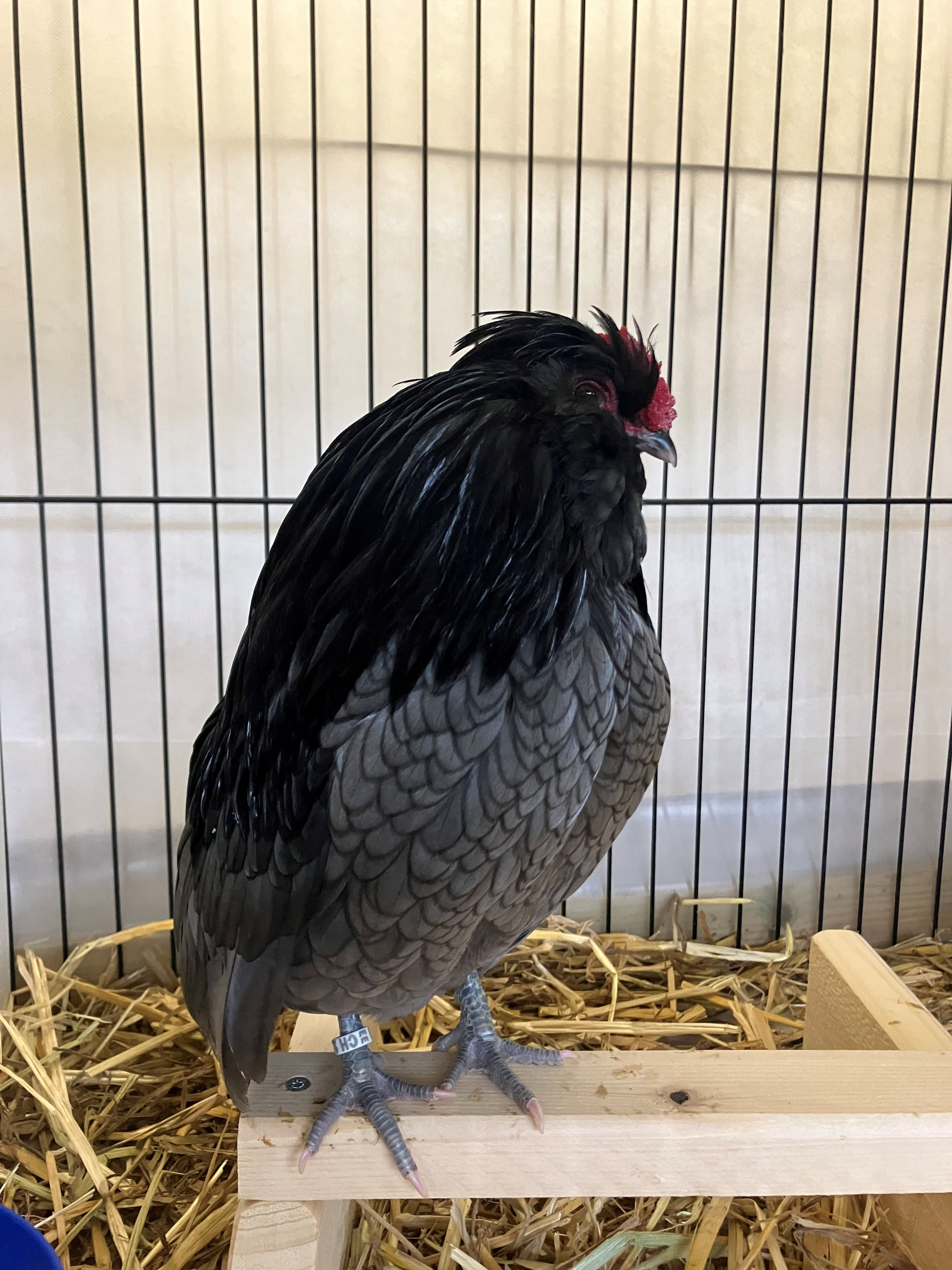
- Conservation status: critical
- Other names: Dutch: Bosvoordse Baardkriel
- Country of origin: Belgium

Traits
- Weight: Male: 600–700 g; Female: 450–500 g

Classification
- EE: yes
- Chicken; Gallus gallus domesticus

The Barbu de Boitsfort or Dutch: Bosvoordse Baardkriel is a breed of true bantam from Belgium. It is a tail-less variety of the Barbu de Watermael, and is otherwise similar to it in every respect. It is named for the commune of Watermael-Boitsfort in the Brussels region of Belgium.

== History ==
The Barbu de Boitsfort is the most recent of the Belgian true bantam breeds. It was created by cross-breeding the Barbu de Watermael with the tail-less Barbu de Grubbe, and was first shown at Bruges in 1997. It received full recognition in Belgium in 2001. It is recognised by the Entente Européenne d'Aviculture et de Cuniculture, but is not included in its Poultry Standard for Europe.

== Characteristics ==
The Barbu de Boitsfort is identical to the Barbu de Watermael in all respects, except that the tail and coccygeal bone are absent. Twenty-three colour varieties are recognised by the Entente Européenne. Eggs weigh about 30 g.
