= Pictave =

French breed of bantam chicken

- Conservation status: FAO (2007): endangered
- Country of origin: France

Traits
- Weight: Male: 800 g; Female: 600 g
- Egg colour: creamy white

Classification
- EE: yes
- PCGB: not listed
- Chicken; Gallus gallus domesticus

The Pictave (French pronunciation: [piktav]) is an endangered French breed of bantam chicken. It is named for the Pictavi, the tribe which gave its name to the former Province of Poitou, now part of the region of Nouvelle-Aquitaine. It is a true bantam, and has no full-sized counterpart; it is the only true bantam of France. Cocks weigh about 800 grams and hens about 600 g. It was created in the twentieth century by Raymond Lecointre, who used the hens to incubate his pheasant eggs and raise the chicks.

== History ==
Like the Belgian Bantam and the Dutch Bantam, the Pictave derives from the widespread European population of small partridge-coloured bantams which in Flemish were known as Engelse kiekskes, "English bantams". From about 1900 these were selectively bred by Raymond Lecointre at Anché, to the south of Poitiers in the département of the Vienne. He used the hens to incubate his pheasant eggs and raise the chicks. A standard for the breed was drawn up in 1928, and approved in 1929.

The Pictave came close to extinction in the years after the Second World War. There were attempts to rescue it by cross-breeding with other bantam breeds. Care was taken to avoid consanguinity, but the poor understanding of genetics of the time meant that the breed deviated from the original pre-War standard. The Bantam Club of France published its first book of standards in 1985; the Pictave was well described, but the illustration did not conform precisely to the standard. This deviation was recognised at the conference of Châtellerault in 1998, and a new breeding objective was established: to return to the 1928 standard.

The Pictave is rare. It was listed as "endangered" by the Food and Agriculture Organization of the United Nations in 2007. In 2014 there were 50 fertile hens.

== Characteristics ==
The Pictave has a long tail, long wings which are carried low, and a rounded breast. Cocks weigh about 800 grams and hens about 600 g.

A single colour, partridge, is recognised for the breed. The legs are pinkish-white and four-toed, the comb, earlobes and wattles red.

== Use ==
Pictave hens are lay about 130 creamy-white eggs per year; the eggs should weigh at least 40 g. The hens are excellent sitters and good mothers.

Pictave hens have been used in the Nord-Pas-de-Calais region (now part of Hauts-de-France) to help in re-introduction of partridge.
