= Alsacienne =

French breed of chicken

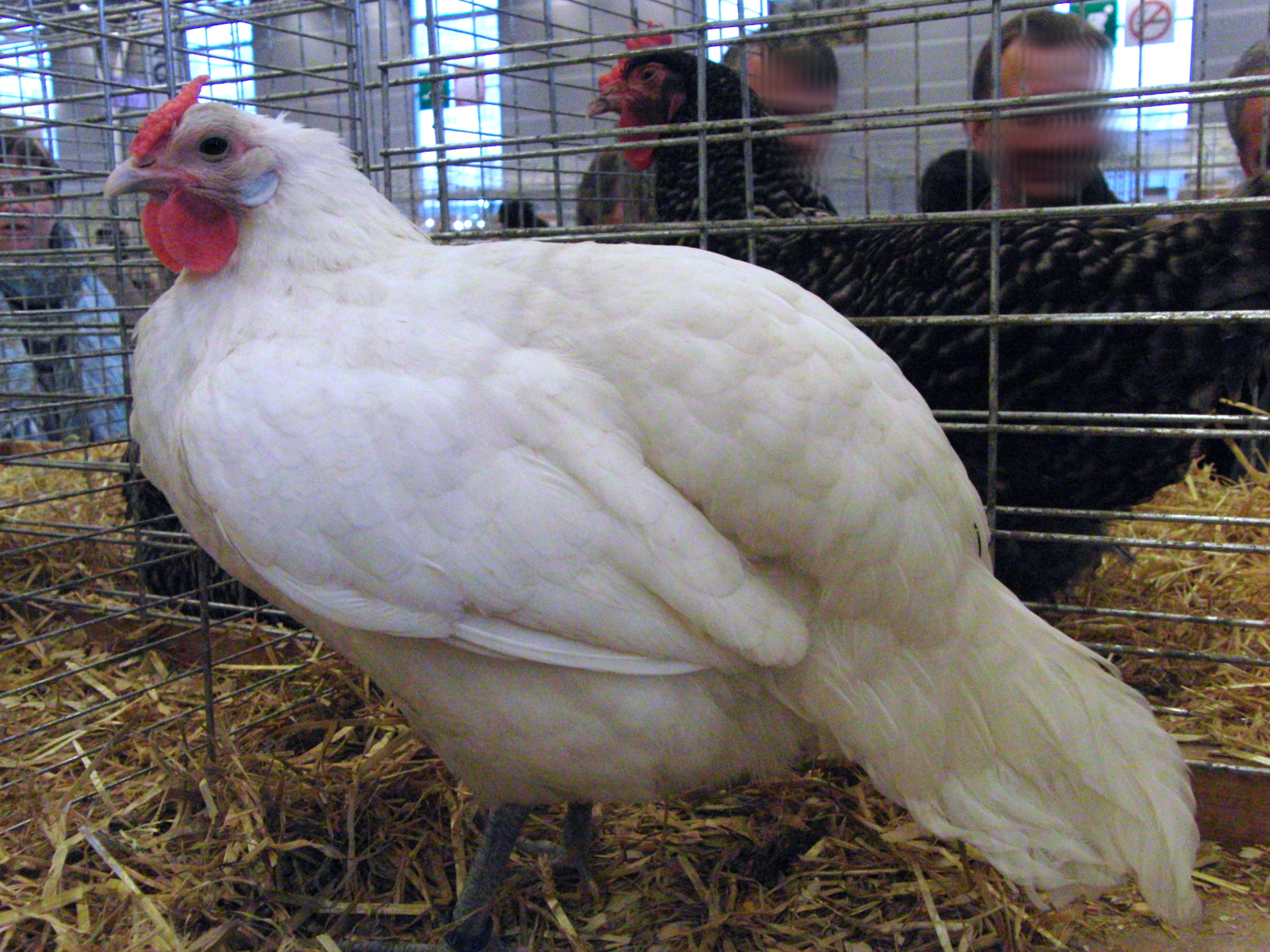
- Conservation status: FAO (2007): standard: not at risk; bantam: endangered; DAD-IS (2025):at risk/endangered
- Other names: French: Poule d'Alsace
- Country of origin: France
- Distribution: Bas-Rhin; Haut-Rhin
- Use: dual-purpose, eggs and meat

Traits
- Weight: Male: large fowl: 2–3 kg; bantam: 950 g; Female: large fowl: 2–2.5 kg; bantam: 800 g
- Egg colour: white
- Comb type: rose comb, ends in a spike

Classification
- APA: not listed
- EE: yes
- PCGB: not listed
- Chicken; Gallus gallus domesticus

The Alsacienne (Note: French pronunciation: [alzasjɛn]) or Poule d'Alsace (Note: French pronunciation: [pul dalzas]) is a breed of domestic chicken from Alsace, in eastern France. It was selectively bred in the 1890s, at a time when Alsace was part of the German Empire. Unlike most other French breeds, it has not been cross-bred with imported Oriental stock.

== History ==
The Alsacienne is an ancient breed, perhaps as long-established as the Bresse Gauloise, which it closely resembles. The present type was formed in the late nineteenth century by selective breeding for a dual-purpose bird; Alsace was at this time a part of the German Empire. The Alsacienne may be related to the German Rheinländer breed, but is differentiated from it by the shape of the comb. A breed standard was drawn up by the Société Alsacienne pour l'Élevage de la Volaille in the early 1890s, and a second standard followed in 1895. The birds were first shown in Strasbourg in 1897.

In the twentieth century the breed came close to disappearance, and is still regarded as being at risk. A bantam was created in Alsace by Herscher, Hirschner and Trog; it was on the "endangered" list of the FAO in 2007.

== Characteristics ==
Four colours are recognised for the Alsacienne – for both large fowl and bantams – by the Fédération Française des Volailles: black, blue-laced, golden salmon and white. The comb is rose-shaped, topped with a spike; it is bright red, as are the wattles. The ear-lobes are white. Body weights for large fowl are some 2–2.5 kg for hens and 2–3 kg for cocks, and for bantams 800 g and 950 g respectively. The corresponding ring sizes are 16 mmand 18 mm for large fowl, and 12 mm and 14 mm for bantams.

== Use ==
The Alsacienne is a good layer of large white eggs, which weigh at least 60 g.

In a tasting of the meat of thirty traditional French chicken breeds by a jury of chefs including Pierre Troisgros, the Alsacienne was placed second, after the poulet de Bresse.

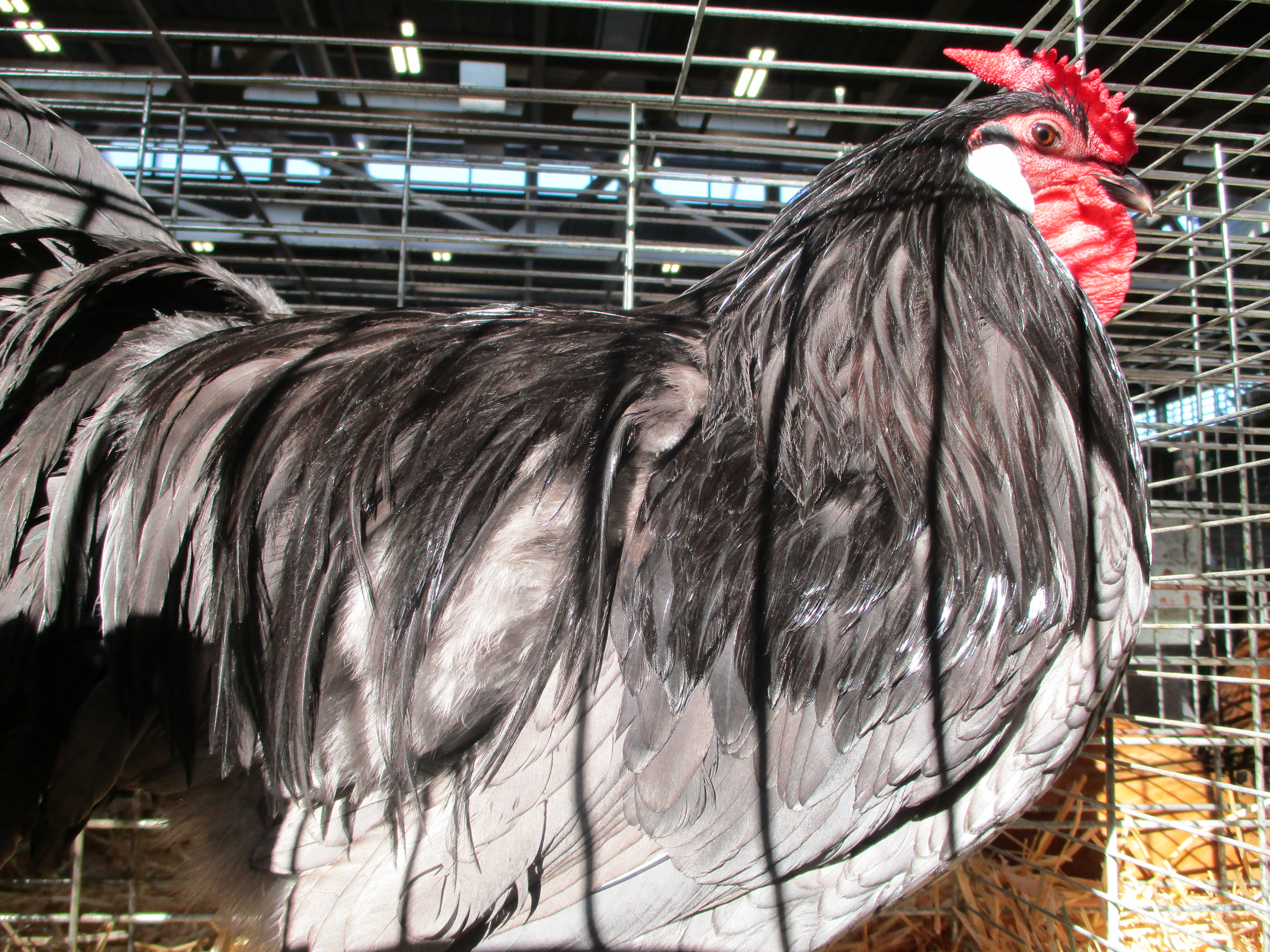
Blue cock

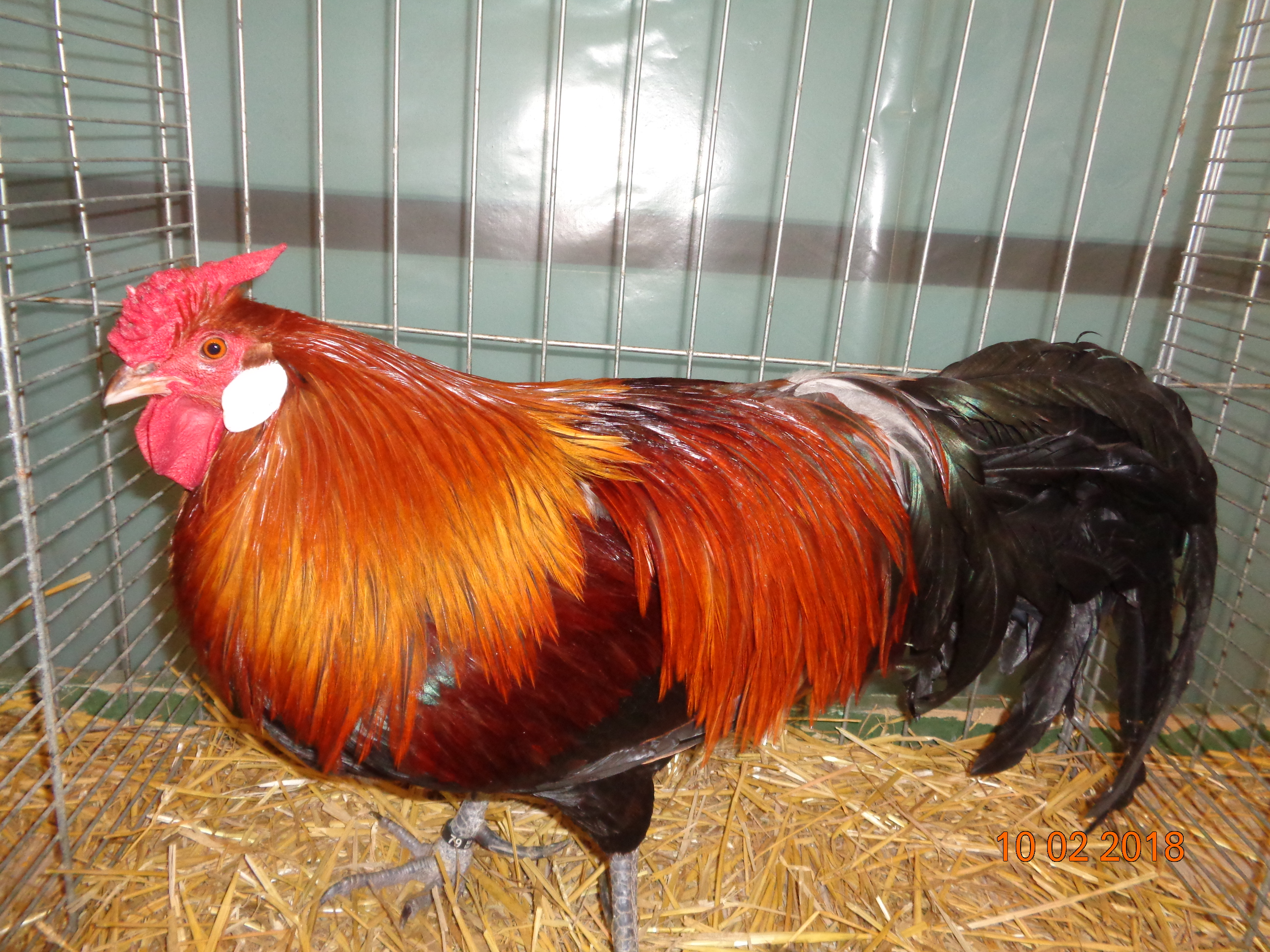
Black breasted red cock

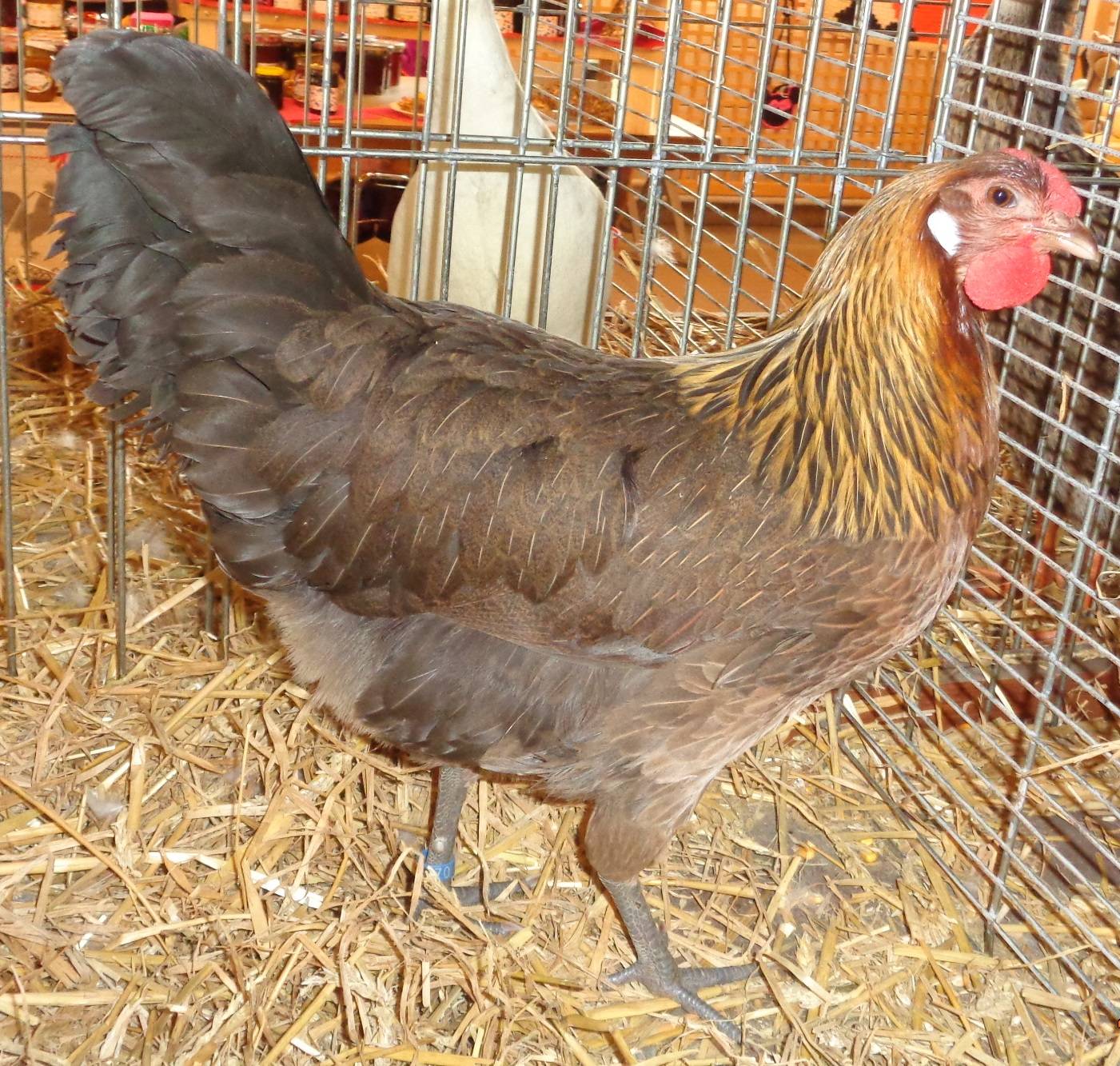
Black breasted red hen

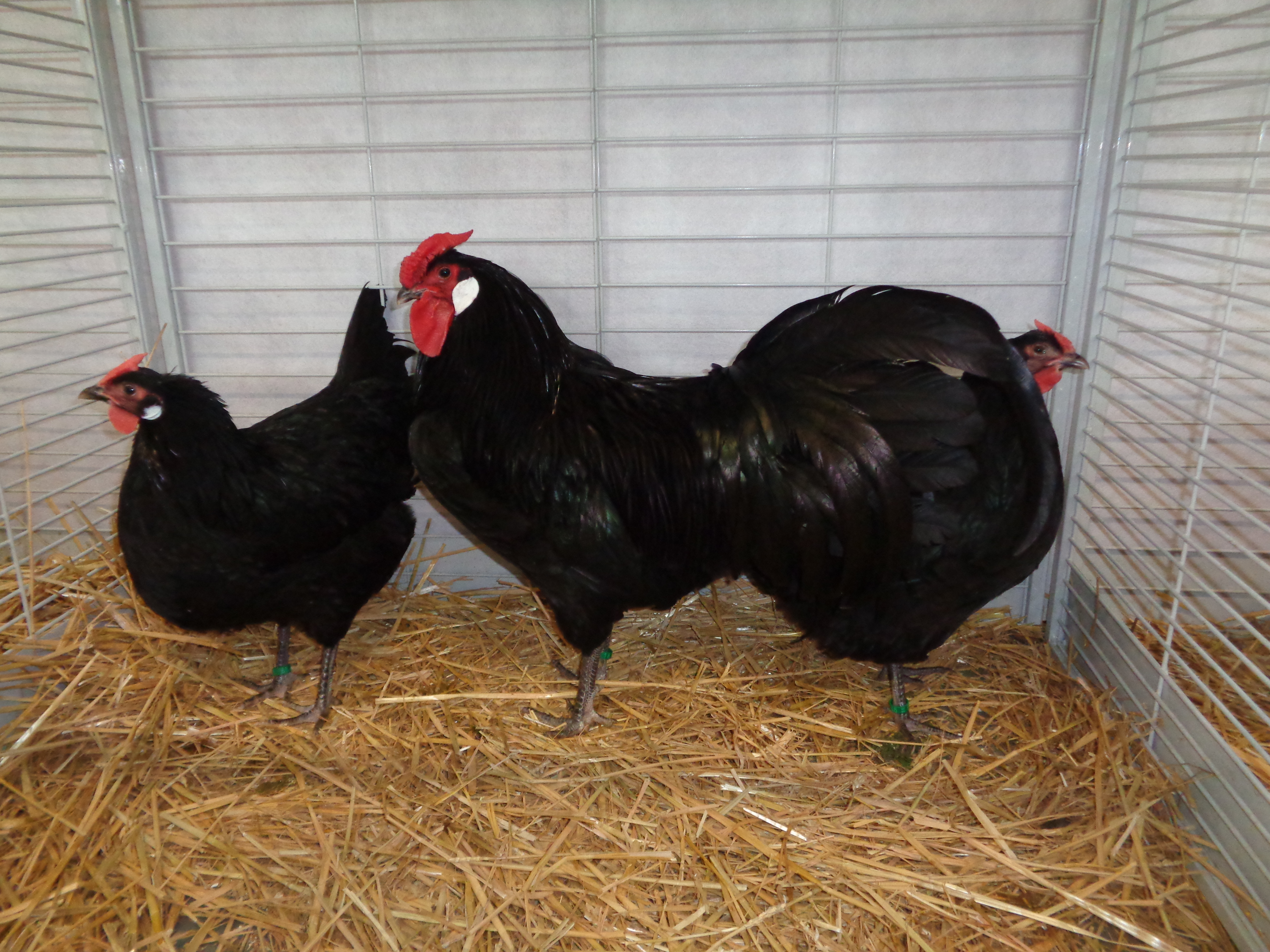
Black Alsaciennes
