= Coucou de Rennes =

Breed of chicken

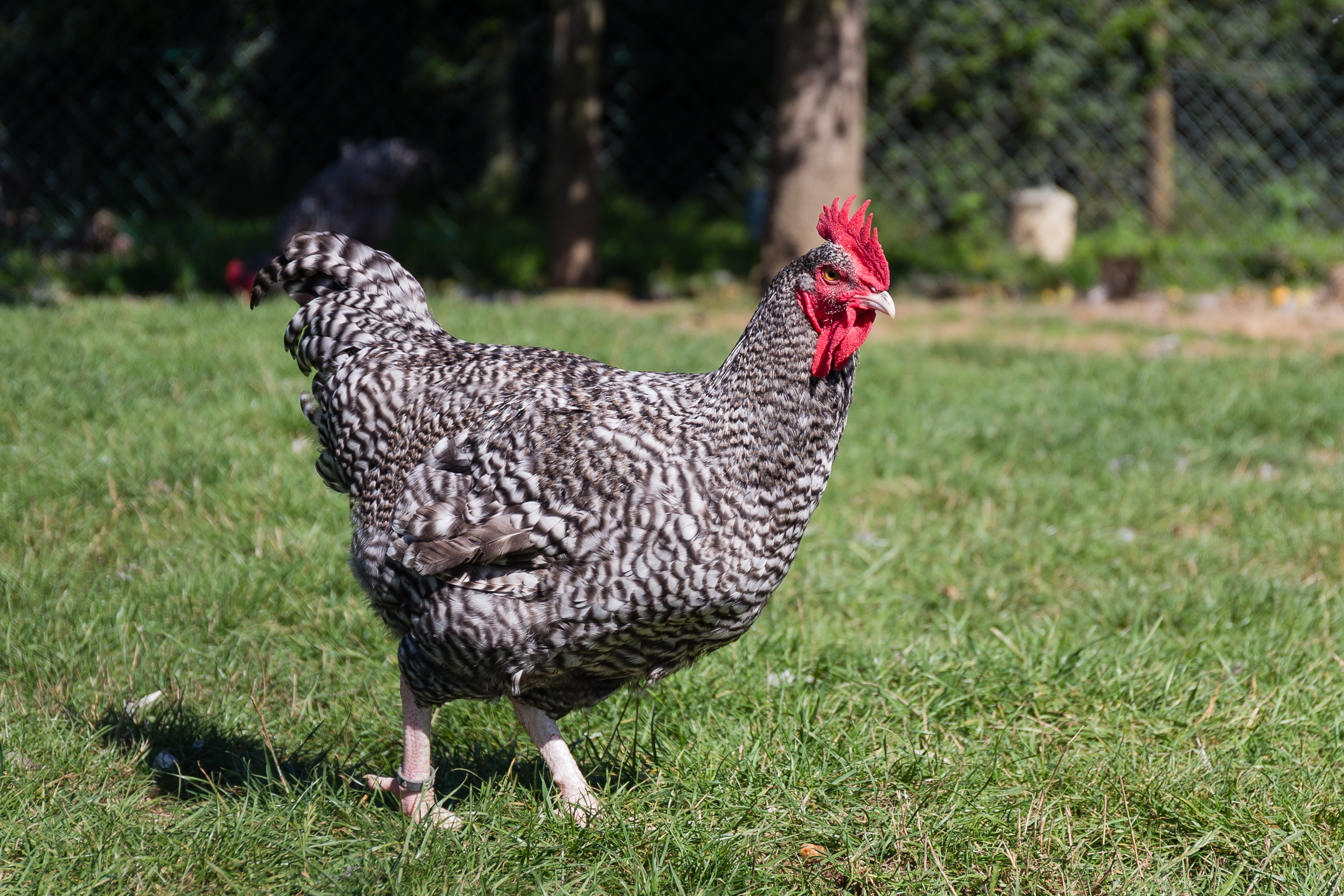
Coucou de Rennes rooster

Coucou de Rennes (French pronunciation: [kuku də ʁɛn]) is a French breed of chicken.

== History ==
The chicken was a historic Breton breed which had nearly disappeared by the late twentieth century. However, starting in 1988 with a rebreeding effort by the Ecomuseum of Rennes, the breed has since recovered. There is an association of Coucou de Rennes chicken producers that has breeding regulations. These state that the minimum age of slaughter must not be before 130 days for the pullet, 180 days for the hens and roosters, and 200 days for the capons.

The breed is classed as heavy and rare by the Rare Poultry Society. Their eggs are of a cream and tinted nature.

The Ecomuseum in Rennes (Écomusée de la Bintinais) cares for a flock of the breed.

In 2015, one dozen producers made approximately 25,000 Coucou.

== See also ==
- List of chicken breeds
