= Bantam (poultry) =

Various breeds of chicken

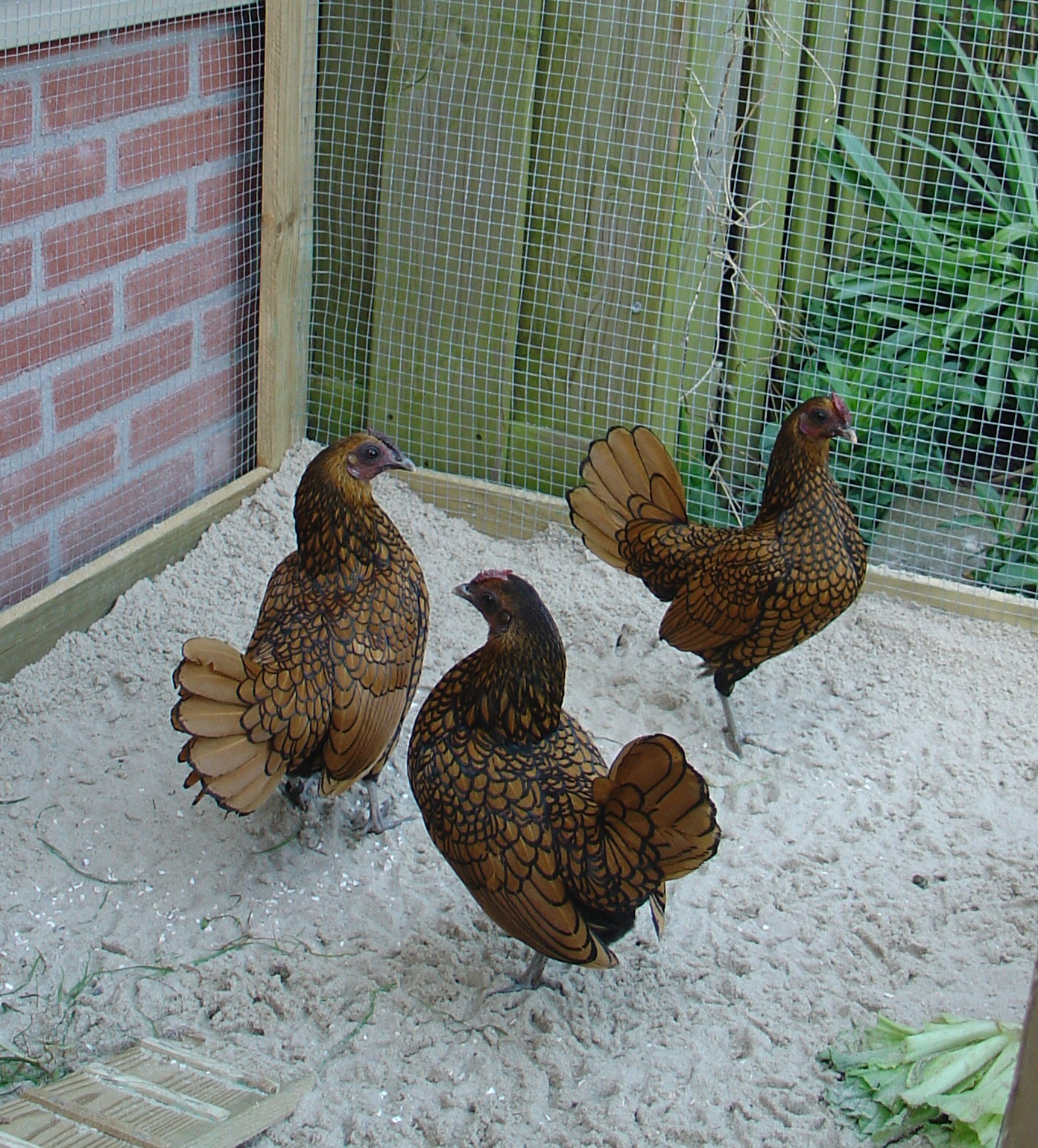
The Sebright is a true bantam chicken breed

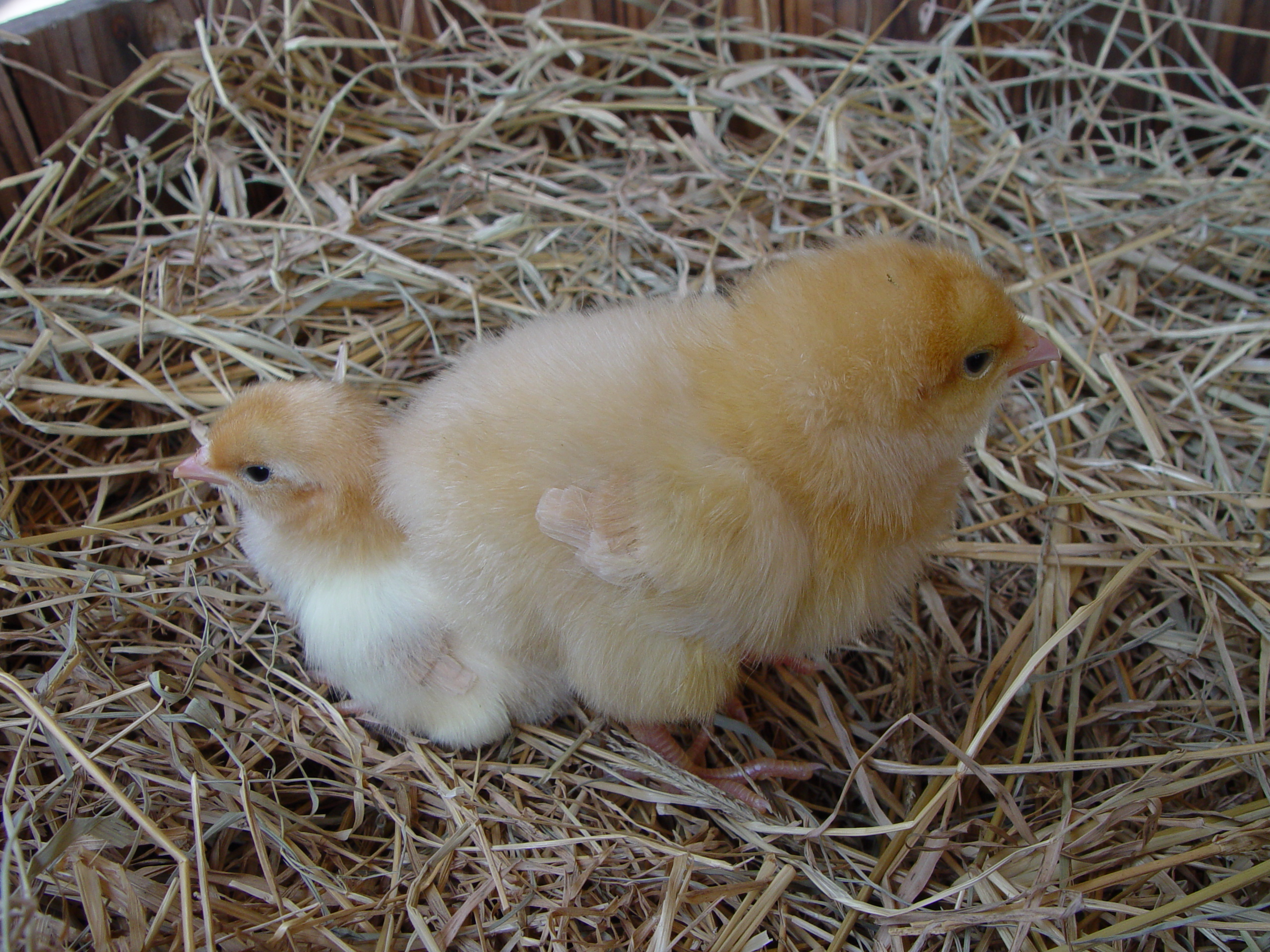
Japanese bantam chick (left) compared to an Orpington chick

A bantam is any small variety of fowl, usually of chicken or duck. Most large chicken breeds and several breeds of duck have a bantam counterpart, which is much smaller than the standard-sized fowl, but otherwise similar in most or all respects. A true bantam chicken is naturally small and has no large counterpart.

== Etymology ==
The word bantam derives from the name of the seaport city of Bantam (Banten) in western Java, Indonesia. European sailors restocking on live fowl for sea journeys found the small native breeds of chicken in Southeast Asia to be useful, and any such small poultry came to be known as a bantam.

== See also ==
- List of chicken breeds
- American Bantam Association
- Call duck – bantam breed of duck originally bred to attract wild ducks within the range of hunters with guns, now kept as pets
- Dwarfism in chickens
- Bantamweight
