= List of chicken breeds =

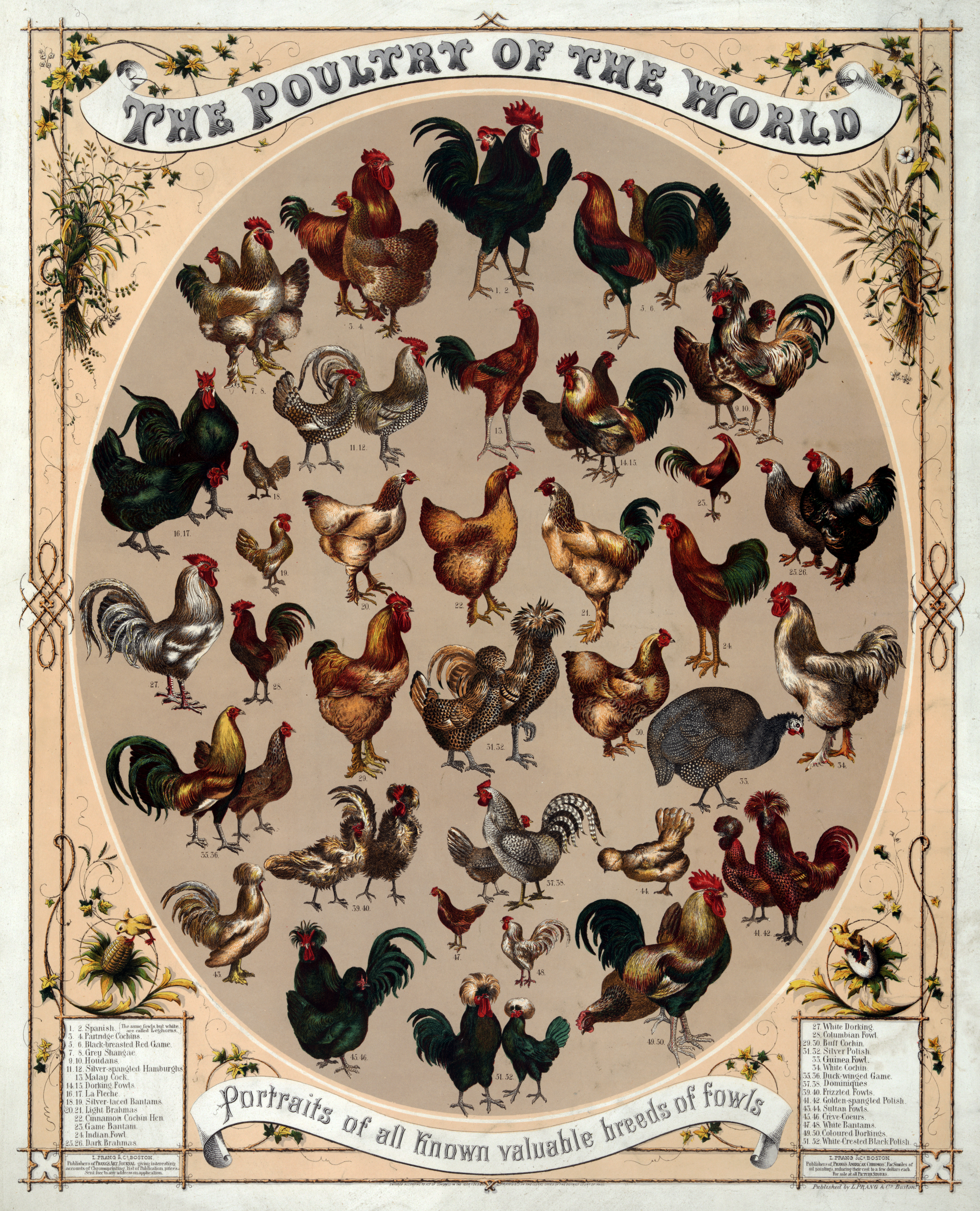
Illustration of thirty-nine varieties of chicken (and one Guinea Fowl)

There are hundreds of chicken breeds in existence. Domesticated for thousands of years, distinguishable breeds of chicken have been present since the combined factors of geographical isolation and selection for desired characteristics created regional types with distinct physical and behavioral traits passed on to their offspring.

The physical traits used to distinguish chicken breeds are size, plumage color, comb type, skin color, number of toes, amount of feathering, egg color, and place of origin. They are also roughly divided by primary use, whether for eggs, meat, or ornamental purposes, and with some considered to be dual-purpose.

In the 21st century, chickens are frequently bred according to predetermined breed standards set down by governing organizations. The first of such standards was the British Poultry Standard, which is still in publication today. Other standards include the Standard of Perfection, the Australian Poultry Standard, and the standard of the American Bantam Association, which deals exclusively with bantam fowl. Only some of the known breeds are included in these publications, and only those breeds are eligible to be shown competitively. There are additionally a few hybrid strains which are common in the poultry world, especially in large poultry farms. These types are first generation crosses of true breeds. Hybrids do not reliably pass on their features to their offspring, but are highly valued for their producing abilities.

Table of contents

By place of origin: Afghanistan • Albania • Australia • Austria • Belgium • Brazil • Bulgaria • Canada • Chile • China • Croatia • Cuba • Czech Republic • Egypt • Finland • France • Germany • Greece • Iceland • India • Indonesia • Iran • Italy • Japan • Korea • Kosovo • Malaysia • Myanmar • Netherlands • Norway • Pakistan • Philippines • Poland • Portugal • Romania • Russia • Serbia • Slovakia • Slovenia • South Africa • Spain • Sweden • Switzerland • Thailand • Turkey • Ukraine • United Kingdom • United States • Vietnam

By primary use: Eggs • Meat • Dual-purpose • Exhibition

Other: Bantams • Hybrids

See also • References • Sources

== By place of origin ==
=== Afghanistan ===
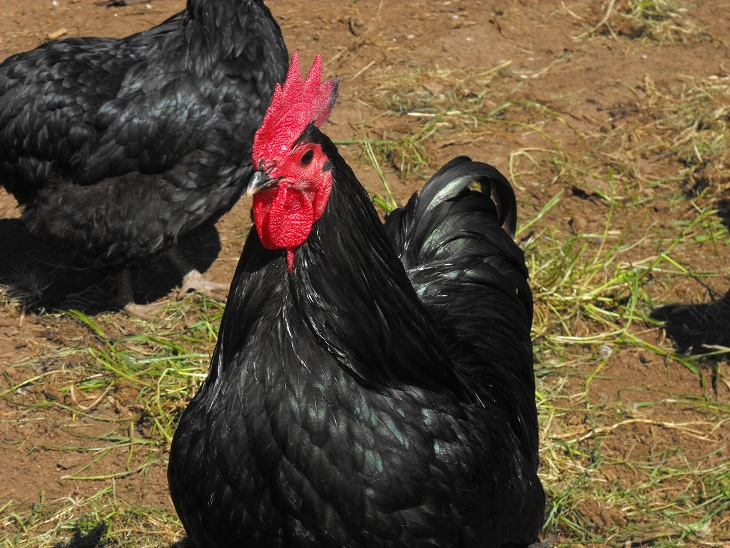
Australorp

- Khasaki
- Kulangi
- Pusty
- Sabzwari

=== Albania ===
- Commune hen
- Black Tropoja Lekbibaj
- Tirana
- Tropoja Pac
- Yerevanian

=== Australia ===
- Australorp
- Australian Langshan
- Australian Game
- Australian Pit Game

=== Austria ===
- Altsteirer
- Sulmtaler

=== Belgium ===
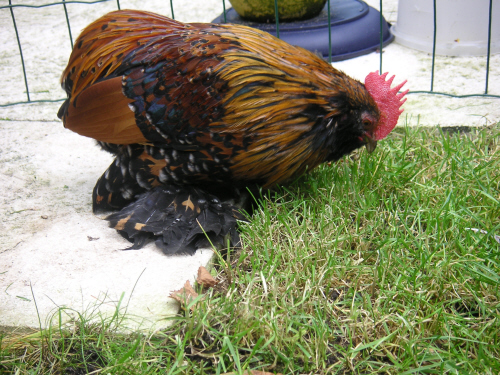
Barbu d'Everberg (Belgium)

- Ardennaise or Ardenner (both large and bantam)
- Ardenner Bolstaart
- Belgian Bearded d'Anvers, Antwerp Belgian, Barbu d'Anvers or Antwerpse baardkriel (bantam)
- Barbu de Boitsfort or Bosvoordse baardkriel (bantam)
- Barbu de Grubbe or Grubbe baardkriel (bantam)
- Belgian d'Everberg, Barbu d'Everberg or Everbergse baardkriel (bantam)
- Barbu de Watermael or Watermaalse baardkriel (bantam)
- Bearded d'Uccle, Barbu d'Uccle or Ukkelse baardkriel (bantam)
- Bassette Liégeoise (bantam)
- Brabanter, Brabançonne or Brabants hoen (large and bantam)
- Braekel or Brakel (large and bantam)
- Campine
- Combattant de Bruges or Brugse vechter (large and bantam)
- Combattant de Liège or Luikse vechter (large and bantam)
- Combattant de Tirlemont or Tiense vechter (large and bantam)
- Coucou d'Izegem or Izegemse koekoek
- Coucou des Flandres or Vlaanderse koekoek
- Famennoise or Famennehoen (large and bantam)
- Fauve de Hesbaye or Gele van Haspengouw
- Fauve de Mehaigne or Gele van Mehaigne (bantam)
- Herve or Hervehoen (large and bantam)
- Huttegem
- Malines or Mechels hoen (large and bantam)
- Mechelse kalkoenkop
- Naine belge or Belgische kriel (bantam)
- Naine de Waes or Waasse kriel (bantam)
- Naine du Tournaisis or Doornikse kriel (bantam)
- Pondeuse de Zingem or Zingems leghoen
- Poule d'Aarschot or Aarschots hoen
- Poule de la vallée de la Zwalm or Hoen van de Zwalmvallei
- Poule de Zottegem or Zottegems hoen
- Zingems vleeshoen

=== Brazil ===
- Índio Gigante

=== Bulgaria ===
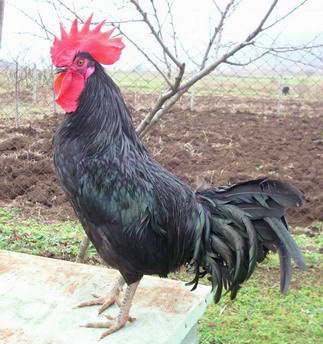
Black Shumen cock

- Black Shumen
- Starozagorska Red

=== Canada ===
- Chantecler
- Red Shaver

=== Chile ===
- Araucana

=== China ===
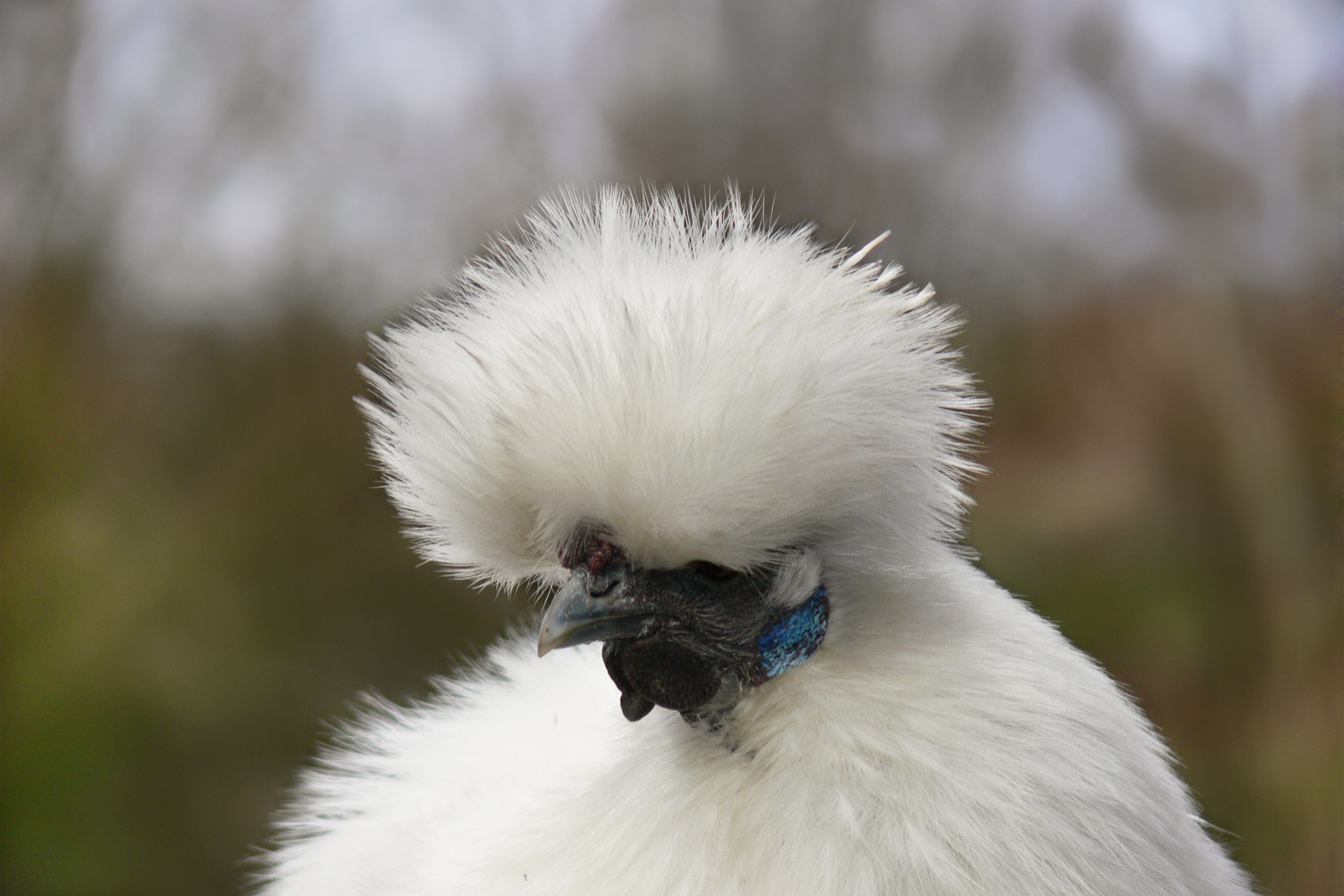
Silkie hen

Breeds listed in DAD-IS:

- Anyi Grey
- Baicheng You
- Baier Buff
- Baier Yellow
- Bashing Long-tail
- Beijing White
- Beijing You
- Bian
- Bian – Nei-Mong
- Chahua
- Changshun Blue-eggshell
- Chengkou Mountain
- Chongren Partridge
- Dagu
- Daninghe
- Dawei Shan Mini
- Dehua Black
- Dongxiang Green
- Dong'an
- Dulong
- Dwarf Small Buff
- Emei Black
- Erh-Mei
- Fuyun Black
- Guangxi Black-bone
- Guangxi Partridge
- Guangxi Sanhuang
- Guangyuan Gray
- Guping
- Gushi
- Haidong
- Henan Fighting
- Hetian
- Hetian Black
- Hongshan
- Hua-Tung
- Huaibei Partridge
- Huainan Sanhuang
- Huaixiang
- Huanglang
- Huangshan Black
- Huiyang Bearded
- Jiangcun Buff
- Jianghan
- Jiangshan Silkie
- Jingmen Black-feather and Blue-eggshell
- Jingxin Buff
- Jingyang
- Jingyuan
- Jinhu Black-bone
- Jining Bairi
- Jinyang Silkie
- Jiujin Yellow
- Jiuyuan Black
- Kangdar Buff
- Kangle
- Langshan
- Langyu
- Lanping Silkie
- Liangshanya Ying
- Lindian
- Lingkun
- Linnan Buff
- Lintao
- Liyang
- Long-leg
- Longsheng Feng
- Lueyang
- Luning
- Lushi
- Luxi Fighting
- Luyuan
- Macheng Blue-eggshell
- Minqing Booted
- Miyi
- Muchuan Black Silkie
- Nandanyao
- New Langshan
- New Pudong
- New Yangzhou
- Ningdu Sanhuang
- Nixi
- Pengxian Buff
- Piao
- Pudong
- Qiandongnan Xiao Xiang
- Qingyuan Partridge
- Rugao Yellow
- Shanbei
- Shimian Caoke
- Short-leg
- Shouguang
- Shuanglian
- Silkie
- Silkie – Ju-Chi
- Taibai
- Taihang
- Taihu
- Taiwan Country Breed
- Taliu Black-bone
- Taoyuan
- Tengchong Snow
- Theen-Yee
- Tianchang Yellow
- Tibetan
- Turpan
- Wanbei Game
- Weining
- Wenchang
- Wenshang Patterned
- Wuding
- Wuhua
- Wuliangshang Black–bone
- Wumeng Silkie
- Wuwei
- Xiangdong
- Xianju
- Xiaoshan
- Xiayan
- Xichuan Black-bone
- Xinghua
- Xingwen Silkie
- Xinxin Dwarf Buff
- Xinxing Buff
- Xinyang Brown Egg
- Xishuangbanna Fighting
- Xuanzhou
- Xuefeng Black-bone
- Yangshan
- Yanjin Silkie
- Yantai Sankang
- Yugan Silkie
- Yunlong Short-leg
- Yunyang Large
- Yunyang Silkie
- Zhangzhou Fighting
- Zhengyang Sanhuang
- Zhongshan Shalan
- Zhuxiang

=== Croatia ===
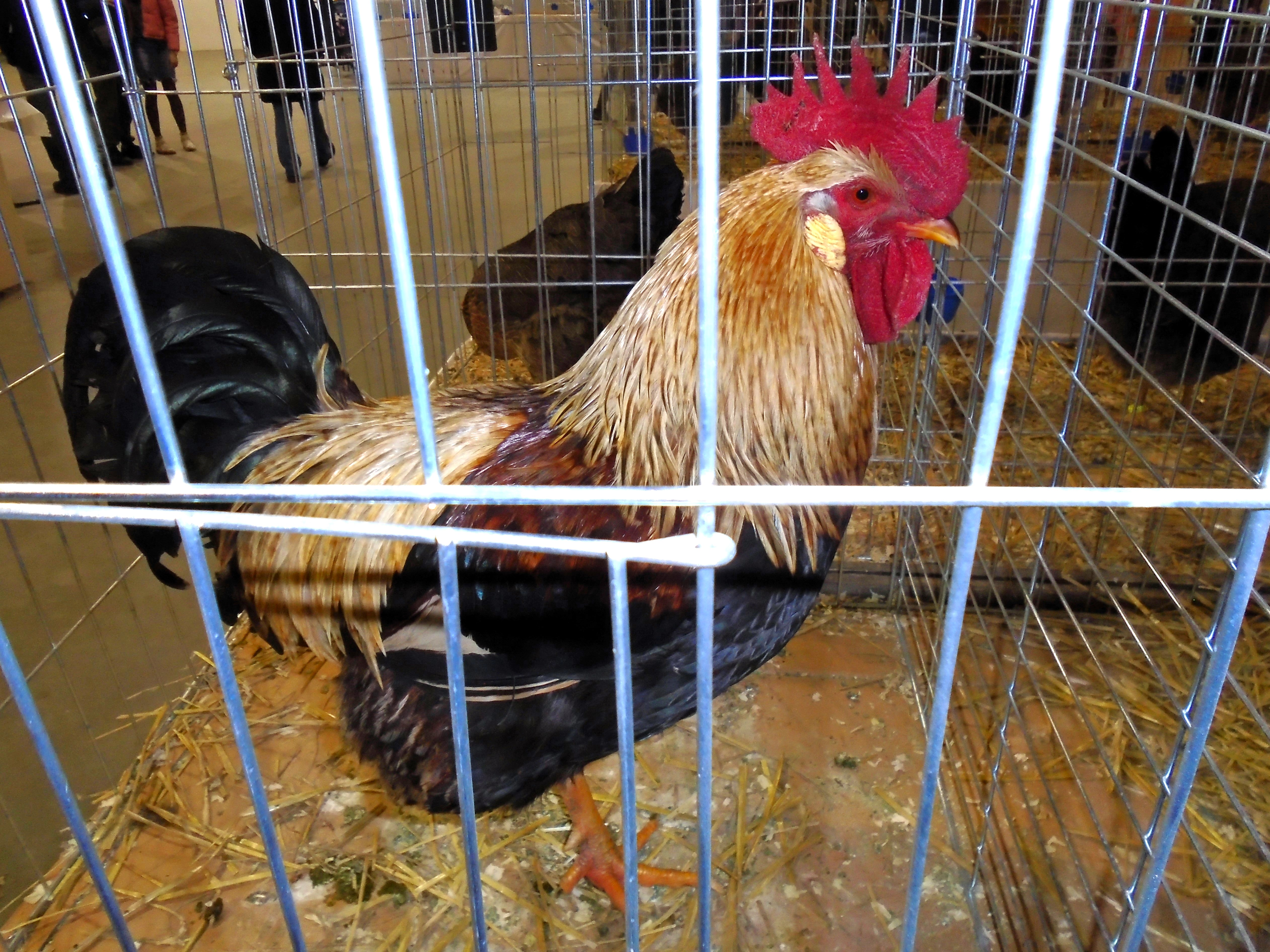
Međimurje Chicken cock

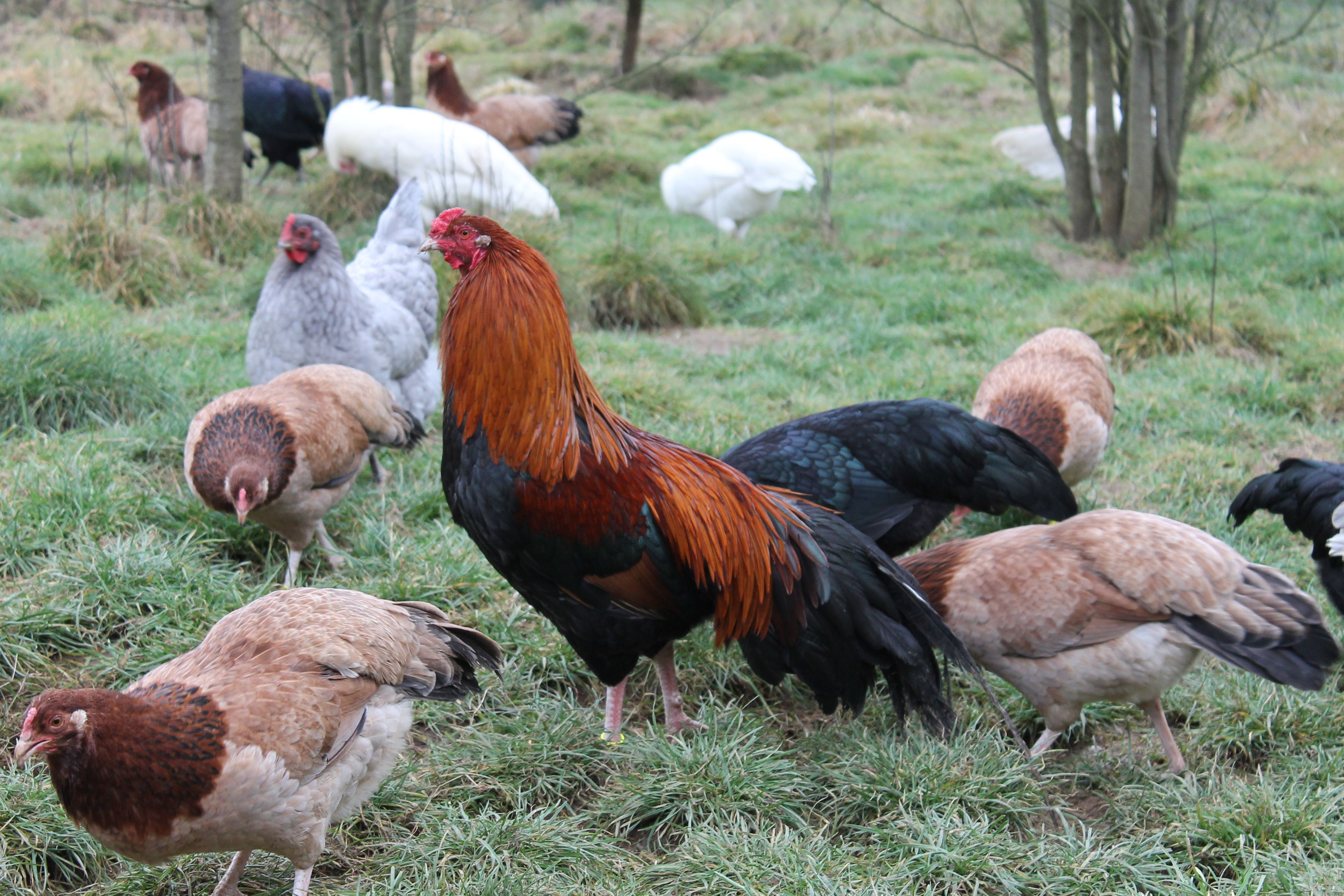
Cubalaya

- Hrvatica (Croatian Hen, Kokoš Hrvatica)
- Međimurska kokoš (Međimurje Chicken, Međimurje Hen)

=== Cuba ===
- Cubalaya

=== Cyprus ===
- Cypriot chicken

=== Czech Republic ===
- Czech gold brindle chicken (Note: Czech language names Czech gold brindle chicken include Česká slepice zlatě kropenatá, Česká zlatá kropenka, and Češka.)
- Šumava chicken or Šumavanka

=== Egypt ===
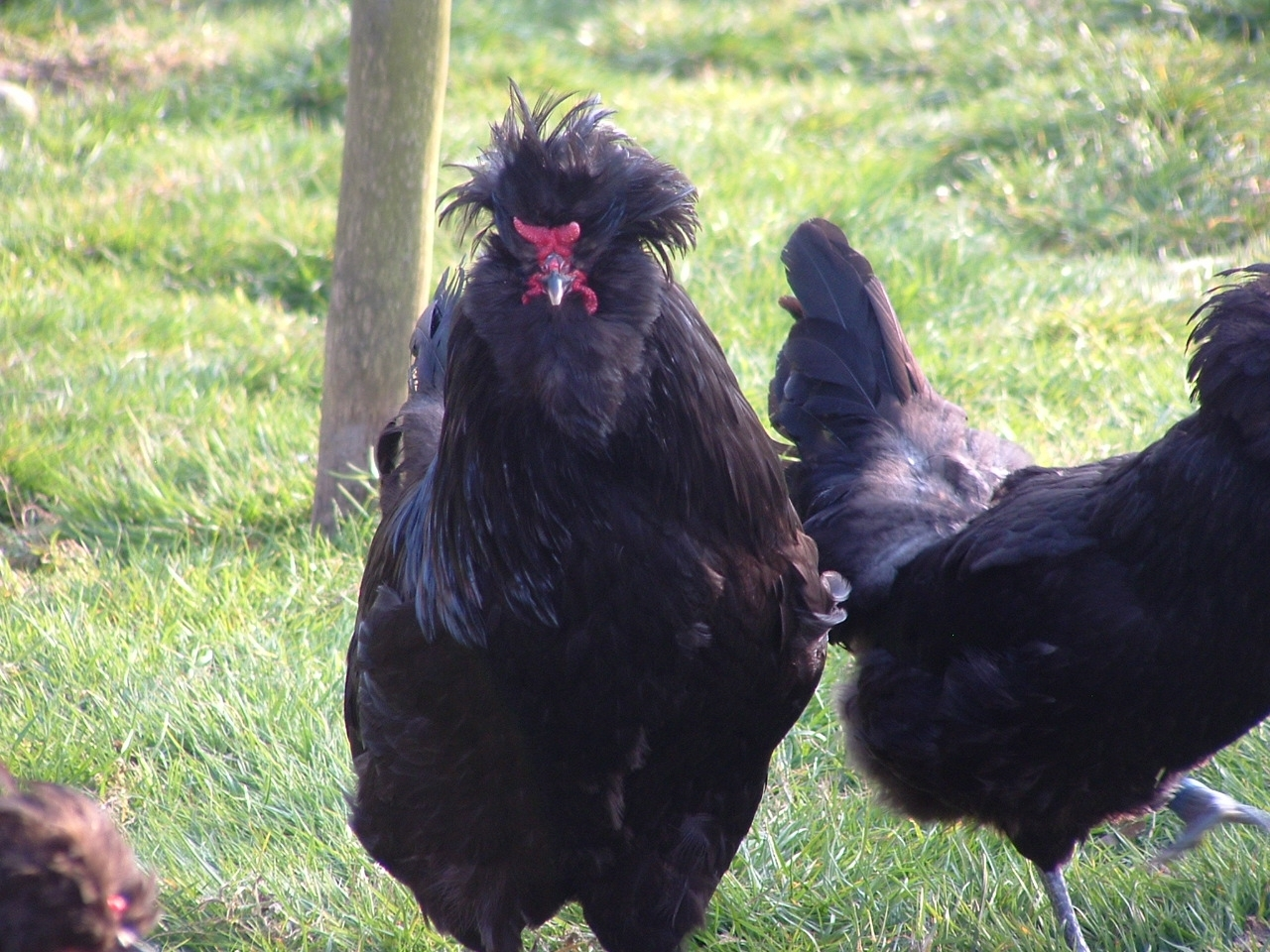
Crèvecœur

- Alexandria
- Arbrikers
- Bahig
- Bandara
- Boffen
- Dandarawi
- Dokki 4
- Baladi Beheri
- Fayoumi
- Gimmizah
- Golden Montazah
- Hawara
- Inshas
- Iven
- Kherbis
- Mandarah
- Matrouh
- Salam
- Silver Montazah
- Sinai

=== Finland ===
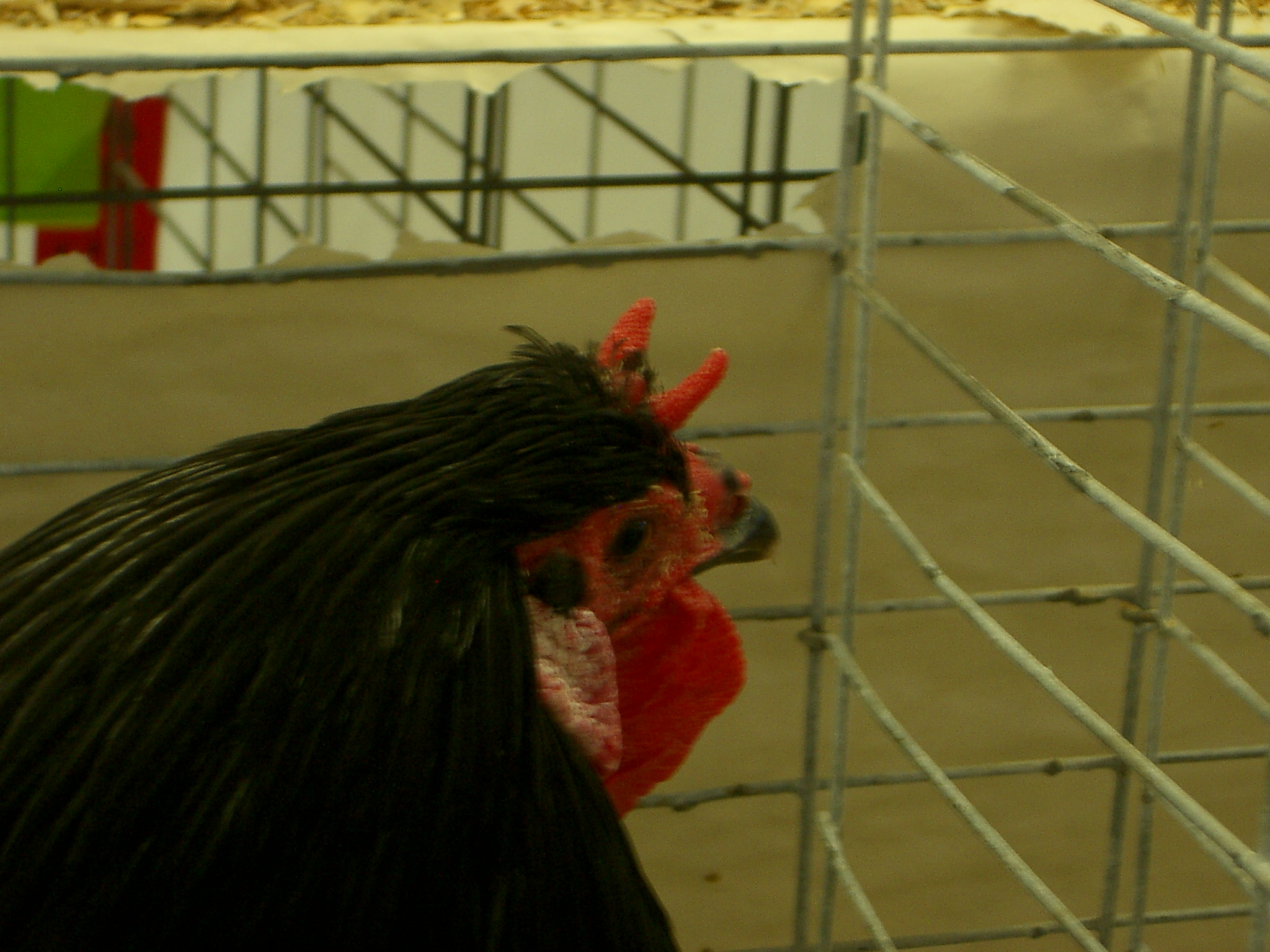
La Flèche

- Alho
- Häme
- Hornio
- Iitti
- Ilmajoki
- Jalasjärvi
- Jussila
- Kiuruvesi
- Lindellin
- Luumäki
- Maatiaiskana
- Piikkiö
- Savitaipale
- Tyrnävä

=== France ===
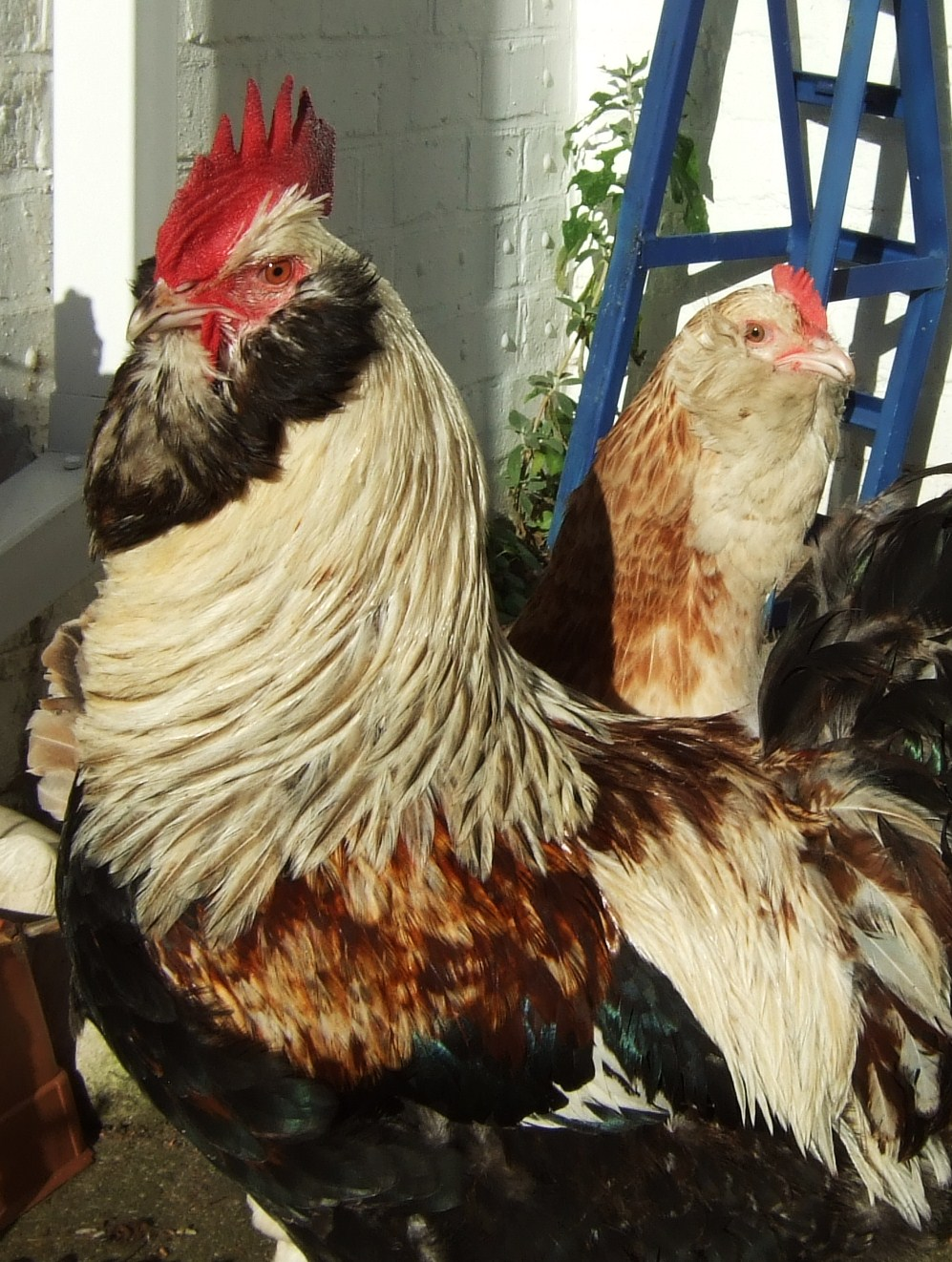
Salmon Faverolles pair

- Aquitaine
- Ardeale
- Ardennaise or Sans-queue des Ardennes
- Barbezieux
- Blanzac
- Bourbonnaise
- Bourbourg
- Bresse Gauloise
- Caumont
- Caussade
- Charollaise
- Cocherelle
- Combattant du Nord
- Contres
- Cotentine
- Coucou des Flandres
- Coucou de France
- Coucou de Rennes
- Coucou Picarde
- Coucou Soie
- Cou-nu du Forez
- Courtes-Pattes
- Crèvecœur
- Estaires
- Faverolles clair (light)
- Faverolles foncée (dark, or "German" Faverolles)
- Favoris
- Gasconne
- Gâtinaise
- Gauloise dorée
- Géline de Touraine
- Gournay
- Hergnies
- Houdan
- Ivanaise
- Janzé
- Javanaise
- La Flèche
- Landaise
- Le Mans
- Le Merlerault
- Meusienne
- Limousine (coq de pêche)
- Lyonnaise
- Mantes
- Marans
- Noire du Berry
- Noire de Challans
- Pavilly
- Poule d'Alsace
- Poule de Caux
- Poule de Marquise
- Poule de Saint-Omer
- Poule des Courrières
- Poule des haies, see Ardennaise
- Provençale

=== Germany ===
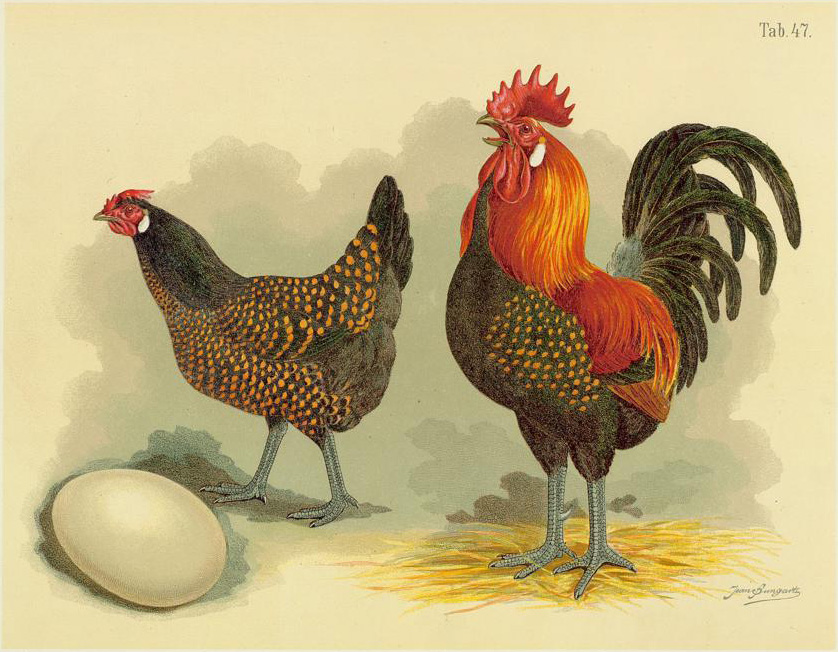
The oldest German breed, the Bergische Kräher, (illustration by Jean Bungartz, 1885)

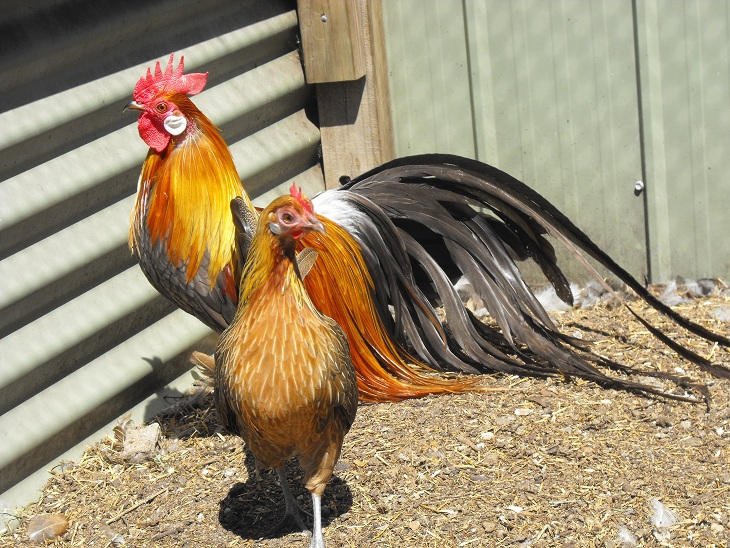
The longtailed Phoenix, a German breed derived from the Japanese Onagadori.

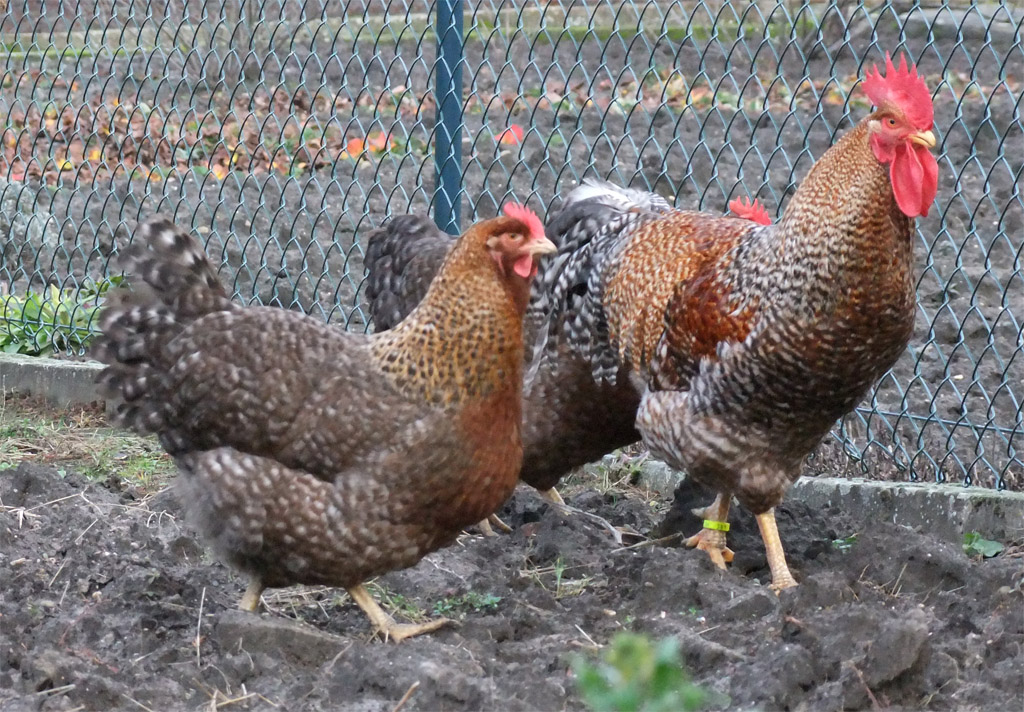
The auto-sexing Bielefelder, created in the 70s

==== Large breeds ====
- Augsburger
- Bergische Kräher,
- Bergische Schlotterkämme
- Bielefelder Kennhuhn
- Deutsches Lachshuhn, see Faverolles
- Deutsche Langschan, see German Langshan
- Deutsches Reichshuhn
- Deutsche Sperber
- Dresdner
- German creeper
- Hamburger, see Hamburg
- Kraienköppe (Twents hoen)
- Lakenfelder, see Lakenvelder
- Nackthalshühner, see Naked-neck
- Niederrheiner
- Ostfriesische Möwen, see East Frisian Gull
- Pfälzer Kämpfer
- Phoenix
- Ramelsloher
- Rheinländer
- Sachsenhuhn
- Strupphuhn, see Frizzle
- Sultanhuhn, see Sultan
- Sundheimer
- Thüringer Barthuhn
- Vogtländer
- Vorwerkhuhn, see Vorwerk
- Westfälische Totleger, see Westphalian chicken

==== Bantam breeds ====
- Bergische Zwerg-Kräher
- Bergische Zwerg-Schlotterkämme
- Bielefelder Zwerg-Kennhühner
- Brügger Zwerg-Kämpfer
- Deutsche Zwerghühner
- Deutsche Zwerg-Lachshühner, see Faverolle Bantam
- Deutsche Zwerg-Langschan, see German Langshan Bantam
- Deutsche Zwerg-Reichshühner
- Deutsche Zwerg-Sperber
- Frankfurter Zwerghühner
- Ostfriesische Zwerg-Möwen
- Ruhlaer Zwerg-Kaulhühner
- Siamesisches Zwerg-Seidenhühner
- Thüringer Zwerg-Barthühner
- Zwerg-Altsteirer
- Zwerg-Amrocks
- Zwerg-Andalusier, see Andalusian
- Zwerg-Araucana, see Rumpless Araucana Bantam
- Zwerg-Asil, see Asil Bantam
- Zwerg-Augsburger, see Augsburger Bantam
- Zwerg-Australorps, see Australorp Bantam
- Zwerg-Barnevelder, see Barnevelder Bantam
- Zwerg-Brahma, see Brahmas
- Zwerg-Brakel, see Brakel Bantam
- Zwerg-Créve Coeur, see Crevecoeur Bantam
- Zwerg-Dominikaner, see Dominique Bantam
- Zwerg-Dresdner
- Zwerg-Hamburger, see Hamburg Bantam
- Zwerg-Italiener, see Leghorn Bantam
- Zwerg-Kastilianer
- Zwerg-Krüper
- Zwerg-La Fléche, see La Fleche Bantam
- Zwerg-Lakenfelder, see Lakenfelder Bantam
- Zwerg-Minorka, see Minorca Bantam
- Zwerg-Nackthalshühner, see Naked-neck bantam
- Zwerg-New Hampshire see New Hampshire Bantam
- Zwerg-Niederrheiner
- Zwerg-Orloff, see Orloff Bantam
- Zwerg-Orpinglon see Orpington Bantam
- Zwerg-Phönix, see Phoenix
- Zwerg-Plymouth Rocks, see Plymouth Rock Bantam
- Zwerg-Rheinländer
- Zwerg-Rhodeländer
- Zwerg-Sachsenhühner
- Zwerg-Sulmtaler, see Sulmtaler Bantam
- Zwerg-Sundheimer
- Zwerg-Sussex, see Sussex Bantam
- Zwerg-Vorwerkhühner see Vorwerk Bantam
- Zwerg-Welsumer see Welsumer Bantam
- Zwerg-Yokohama see Yokohama Bantam

=== Greece ===
- Alonissos island chicken
- Chios Fighting chicken
- Follidotes chicken
- Kalamata chicken
- Pomak Fighting chicken
- Lesvos Fillianes chicken
- Trikala chicken

=== Iceland ===
- Icelandic chicken

=== India ===
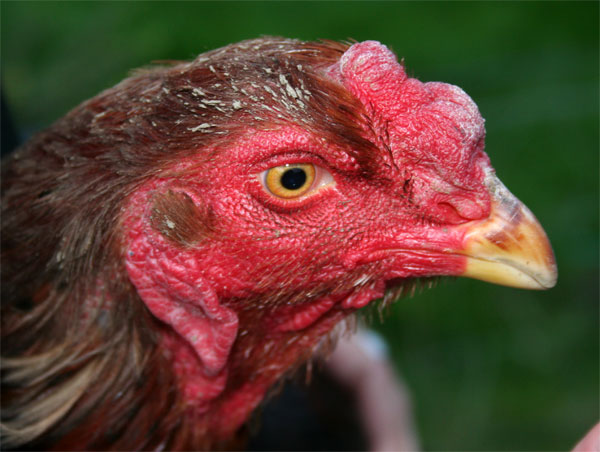
Aseel, a fighting breed

- Ankaleshwar
- Aseel
- Busra
- Cari Gold
- Danki
- Daothigir
- Debendra
- Desi Murgi or Nati Kohli
- Dhanraja
- Ghagus
- Giriraja
- Gramalakshmi
- Gramapriya
- Kadaknath
- Kalasthi
- Kalinga Brown
- Kashmir Faverolla
- Krishna-J
- Miri
- Mrityunjay
- Nicobari
- Punjab Brown
- Siru vidai
- Tellicherry
- Vanaraja
- Yamuna

=== Indonesia ===
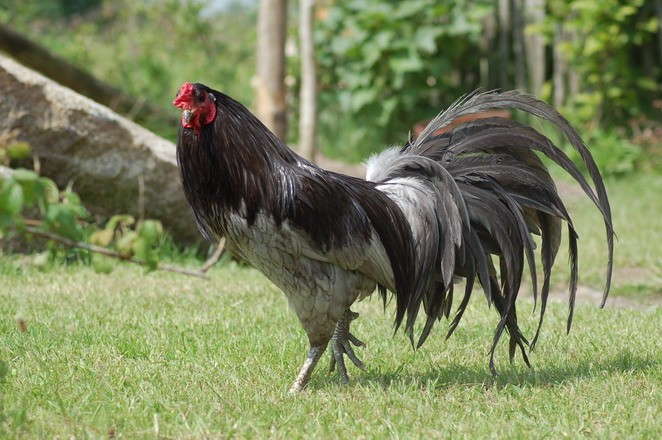
Sumatra cock

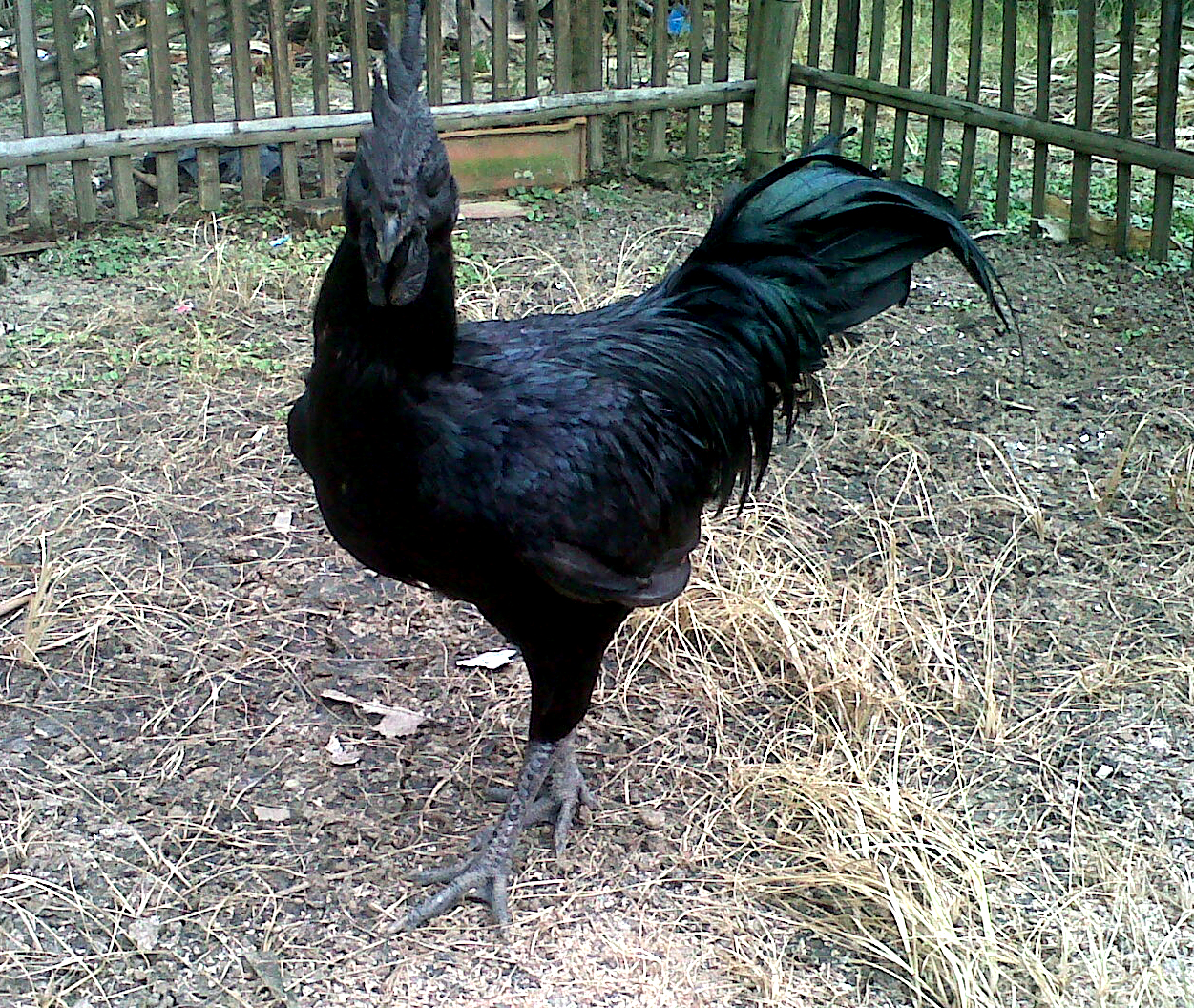
Ayam Cemani

- Ayam Cemani
- Bantam (known as Ayam Kate in Indonesia)
- Bekisar (interspecific hybrid)
- Ketawa
- Sumatra chicken
- Kedu (nationally standardized)
- Sentul (nationally standardized)
- Kokok Balenggek (nationally standardized)
- Pelung (long-crower from West Java, locally standardized)

=== Iran ===
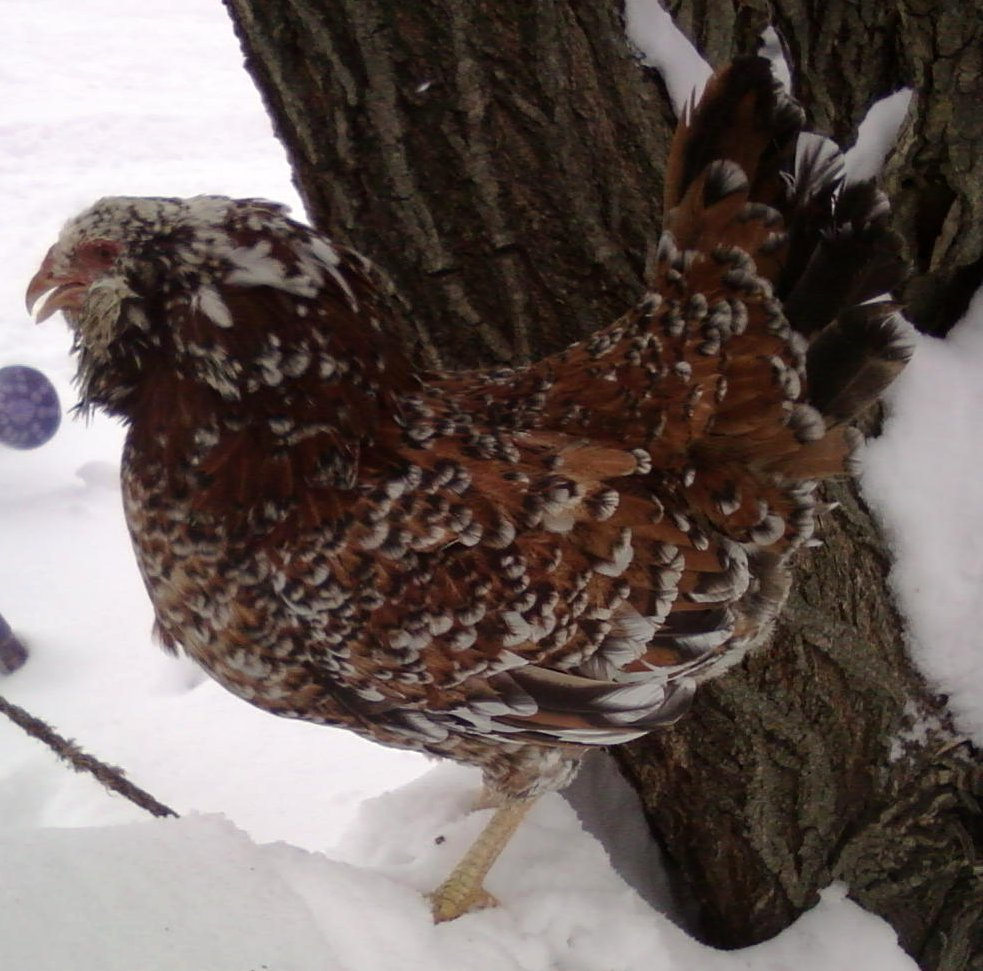
Iranian Orloff breed

- Manx Rumpy (or Rumpless Game)
- Orloff
- Black Azerbaijan (or Marandi)

=== Italy ===
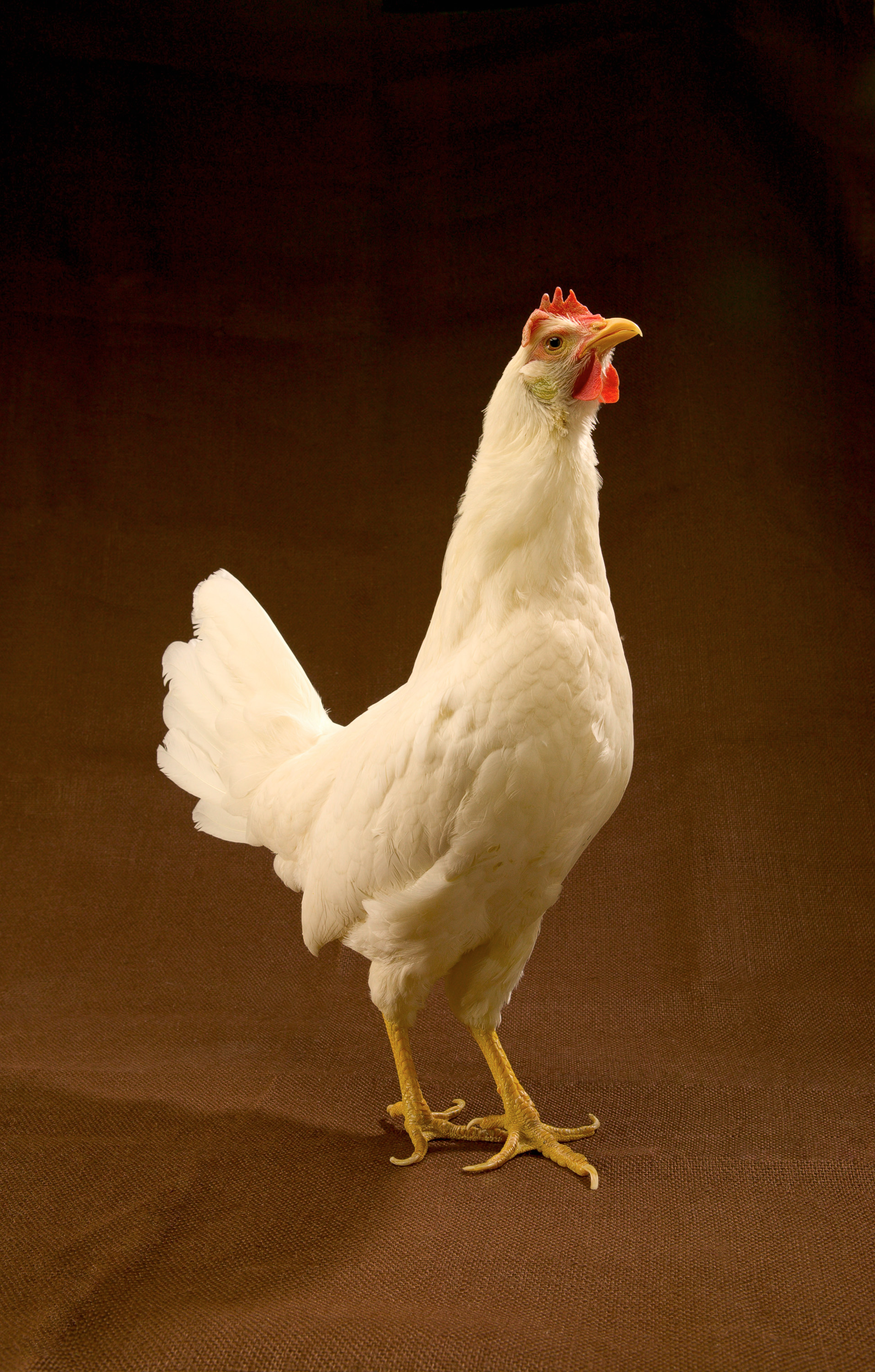
Leghorn hen

- Ancona
- Bianca di Saluzzo
- Bionda Piemontese
- Ciuffine Ghigi
- Collo Nudo Italiano
- Ermellinata di Rovigo
- Livorno, see Leghorn
- Mericanel della Brianza
- Millefiori di Lonigo
- Millefiori Piemontese
- Modenese
- Mugellese
- Padovana
- Padovana Riccia
- Pepoi
- Polverara
- Robusta Lionata
- Robusta Maculata
- Romagnola
- Siciliana
- Sicilian Buttercup
- Valdarno
- Valdarnese

=== Japan ===
- Daigiri-Shamo
- Echigo-Nankin-Shamo
- Ehime-Jidori
- Ekoku
- Gan-Dori or Gankei
- Gifu-Jidori
- Hinai-Dori
- Hiroshima-Tsuuji
- Ingie or Ingii-Dori
- Ise-Jidori
- Iwate-Jidori
- Izumo
- Japanese Bantam or Chabo
- Jisuri
- Jitokko
- Kawachi-Yakko
- Kinpa or Kinpachi-Dori
- Koeyoshi
- Ko-Shamo
- Kumamoto or Kumamotoshu
- Kureko-Dori
- Kuro-Kashiwa
- Mie-Jidori
- Mikawa or Mikawashu
- Minohiki or Minohiki-Dori
- Miyaji-Dori
- Nagoya or Nagoyashu
- Nankin-Shamo
- Ohiki
- Oh-Shamo
- Okinawa-Hige-Jidori
- Onagadori or Tosa-Onagadori
- Sado-Hige-Jidori
- Satsumadori
- Shibattori or Shiba-Dori
- Shoukoku or Oguni-Dori
- Tokara-Jidori
- Tokuji-Jidori
- Tomaru
- Tosa-Kojidori
- Tosa-Kukin or Tosa-Cochin
- Tosa-Jidori
- Totenko or Totenko-Dori
- Tsushima-Jidori
- Ukokkei
- Utaicharn or Utai-Chahn
- Uzurao
- Yakido, Ygido or Hachikido
- Yamato-Shamo

=== Korea ===
- Chunggye
- Jangmigye
- Korean Native chicken

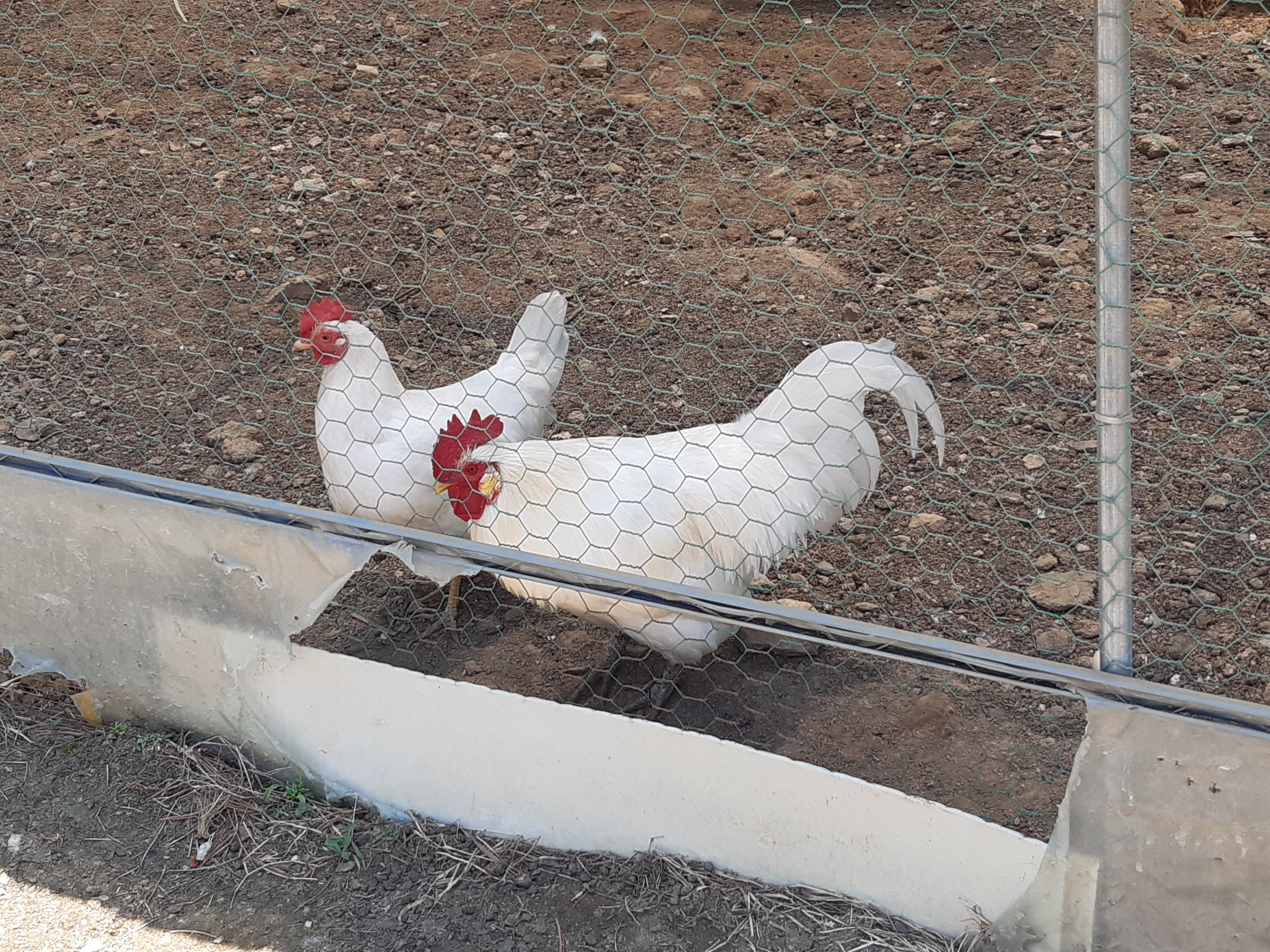
White Korean native pair

=== Kosovo ===
- Kosova Long-crowing (also called Tringjyrshet Kosov)

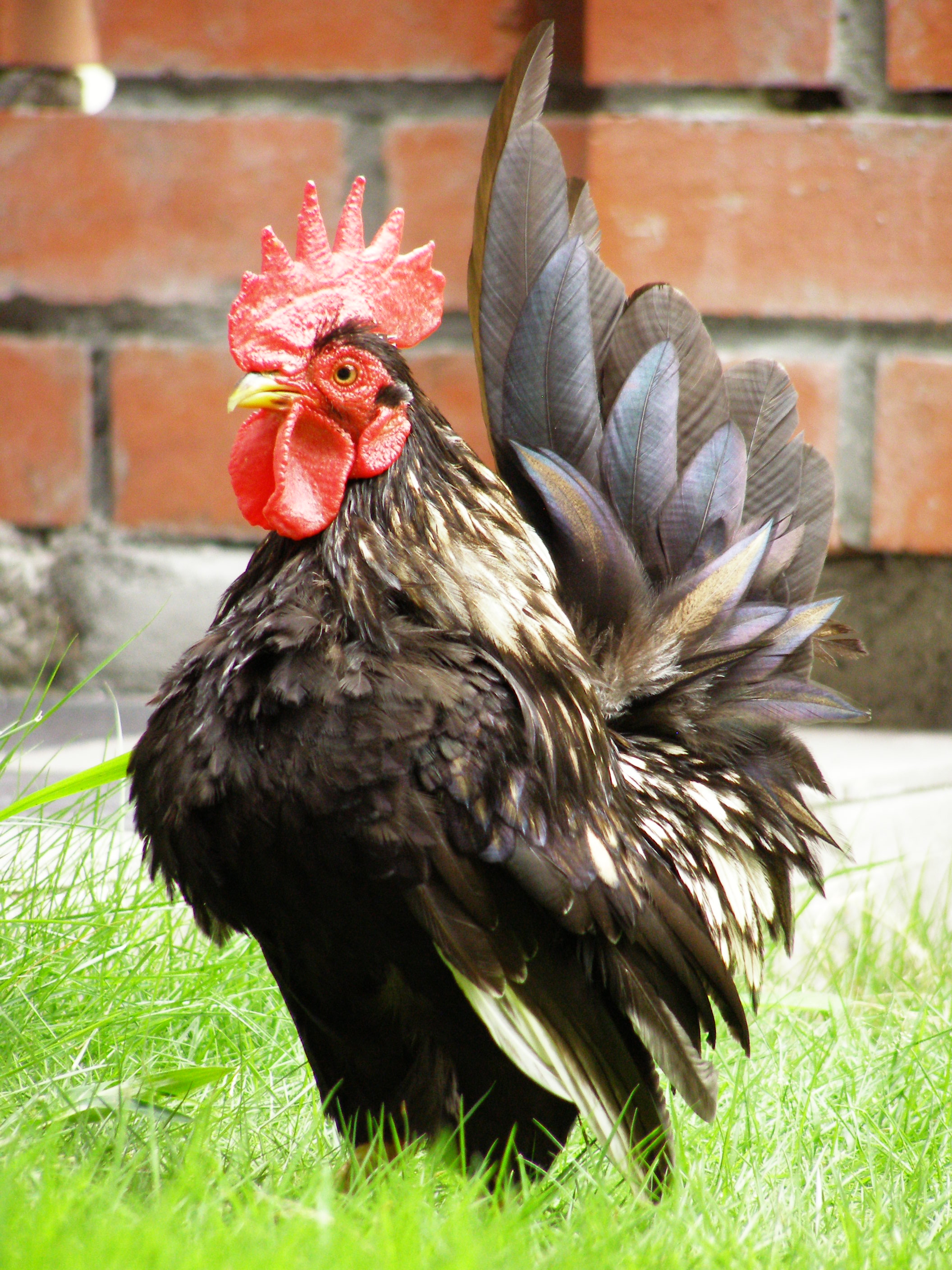
Malaysian serama

=== Malaysia ===
- Kampung
- Malay
- Serama

=== Mariana Islands ===
- Saipan Jungle Fowl

=== Myanmar ===
- Burmese
- Pama Game

=== Netherlands ===
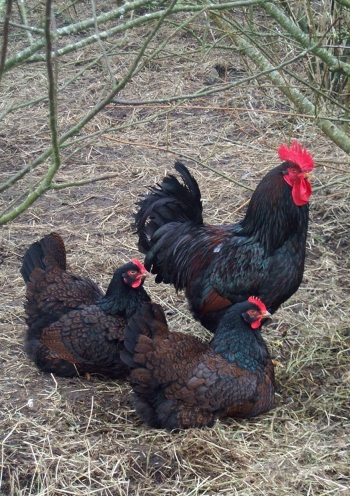
Barnevelders

- Assendelfts Hoen (large and bantam)
- Barnevelder (large and bantam)
- Brabanter (large and bantam)
- Chaamse hoenders
- Drents Hoen (large and bantam)
- Eikenburgerkriel (bantam)
- Fries Hoen (large and bantam)
- Friesian
- Groninger Meeuw (large and bantam)
- Hollandse Kriel, see Dutch Bantam (bantam)
- Hollandse Kuifhoen (large and bantam)
- Hollands Hoen (large and bantam), see Hamburg chicken (large and bantam)
- Kraaikop (large and bantam)
- Lakenvelder (large and bantam)
- Nederlandse Baardkuifhoen (large and bantam)
- Nederlandse Sabelpootkriel, see Dutch Booted Bantam (bantam)
- Nederlandse Uilebaard (large and bantam)
- Noord Hollands Hoen or Noord-Hollandse Blauwe, see North Holland Blue (large and bantam)
- Schijndelaar
- Twents Hoen (large and bantam)
- Welsummer (large and bantam)

=== Norway ===
- Norwegian Jærhøne

=== Pakistan ===
- Asil (or Aseel)
- Sindhi
- Misri
- Lyallpur Silver black

=== Philippines ===
- Banaba
- Bolinao
- Camarines
- Darag
- Paraoakan or Parawakan

=== Poland ===
- Polbar
- Zielononóżka Kuropatwiana (Green-legged Partridge)
- Polish chicken

=== Portugal ===
- Amarela
- Preta Lusitânica
- Pedrês Portuguesa
- Branca

=== Hungary ===
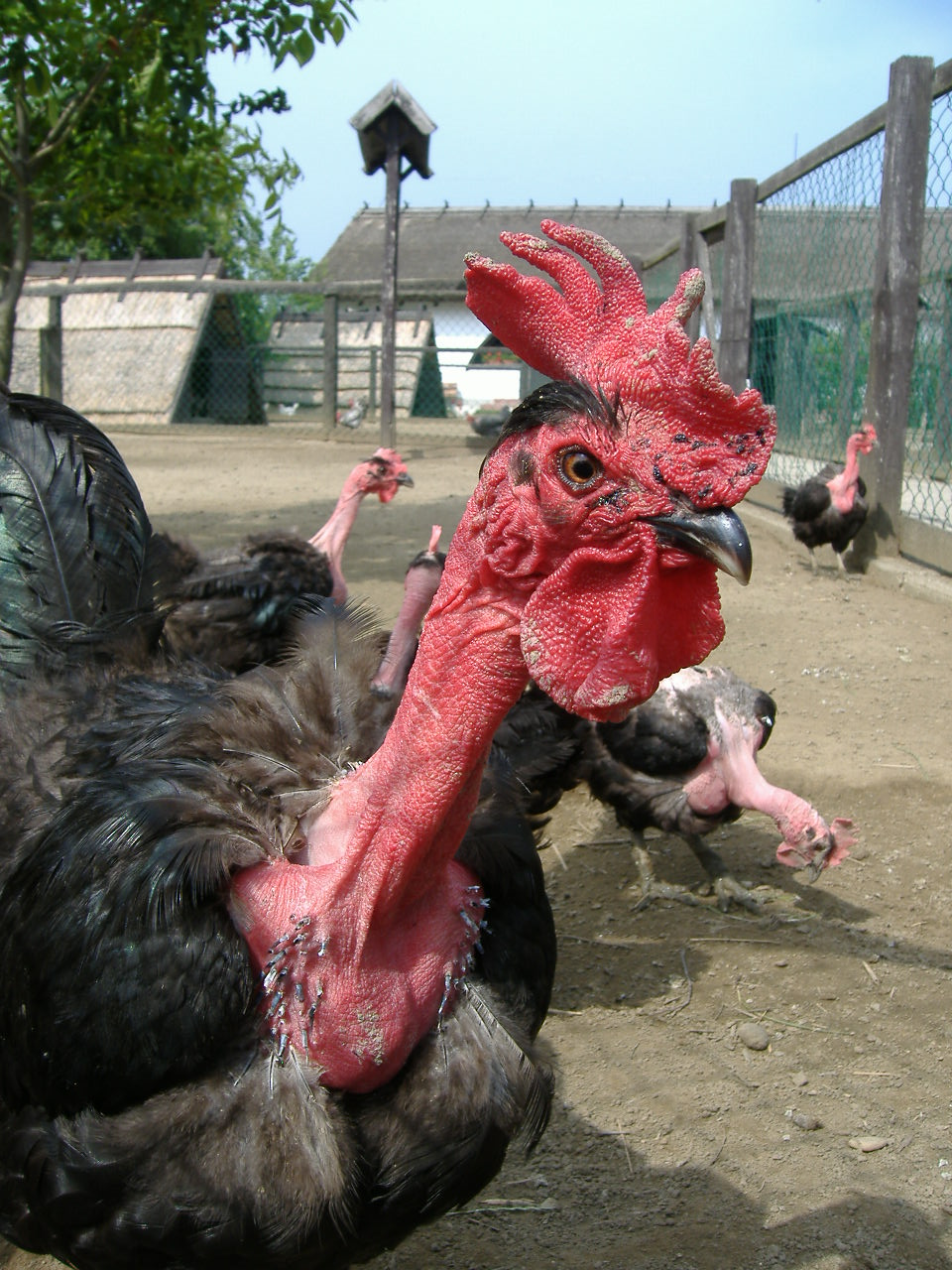
Naked-neck

- Transylvanian Black Naked-neck
- Transylvanian White Naked-neck
- Transylvanian Hemp-spangled Naked-neck
- Yellow Hungarian chicken
- White Hungarian chicken
- Prisoner color Hungarian chicken
- Hemp-spangled Hungarian chicken
- Palóc naked-neck chicken
- Krédli chicken
- Baranya landrace chicken
- Mecseki Zengő chicken

=== Russia ===
- Russian Orloff
- Yurlov Crower

=== Serbia ===
- Banat Naked-neck (Banatski gološijan)
- Sombor Kaporka (Somborska kaporka)
- Svrljig Black (Svrljiška kokoš)

=== Slovakia ===
- Oravka

=== Slovenia ===
- Styrian Hen (or Altsteirer)
- Slovenian Barred Hen
- Slovene Late-feathered Hen
- Slovenian Brown Hen
- Slovenian Silver Hen

=== South Africa ===
- Ovambo
- Potchefstroom Koekoek
- Venda
- Boschveld

=== Spain ===
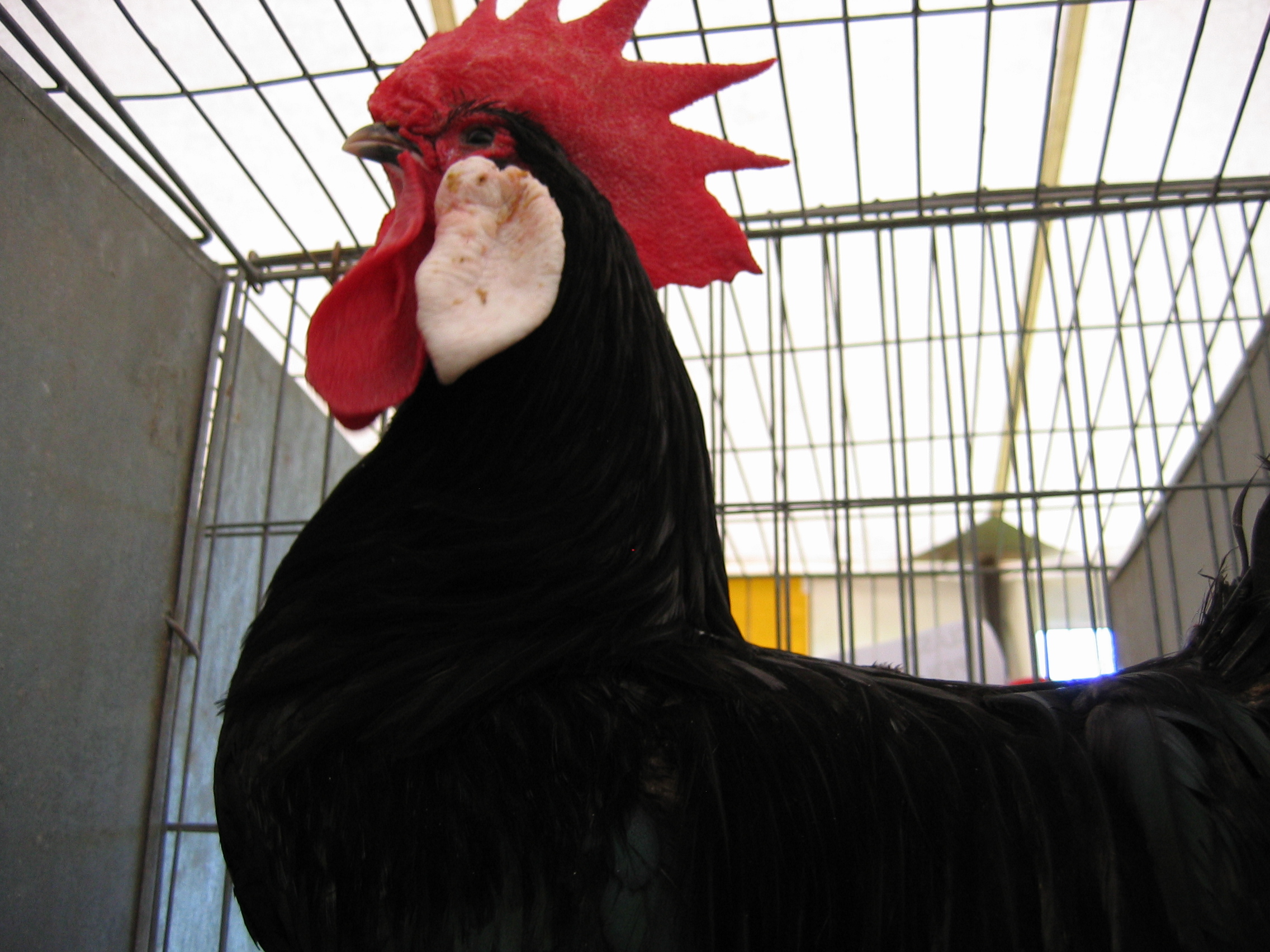
Minorca rooster

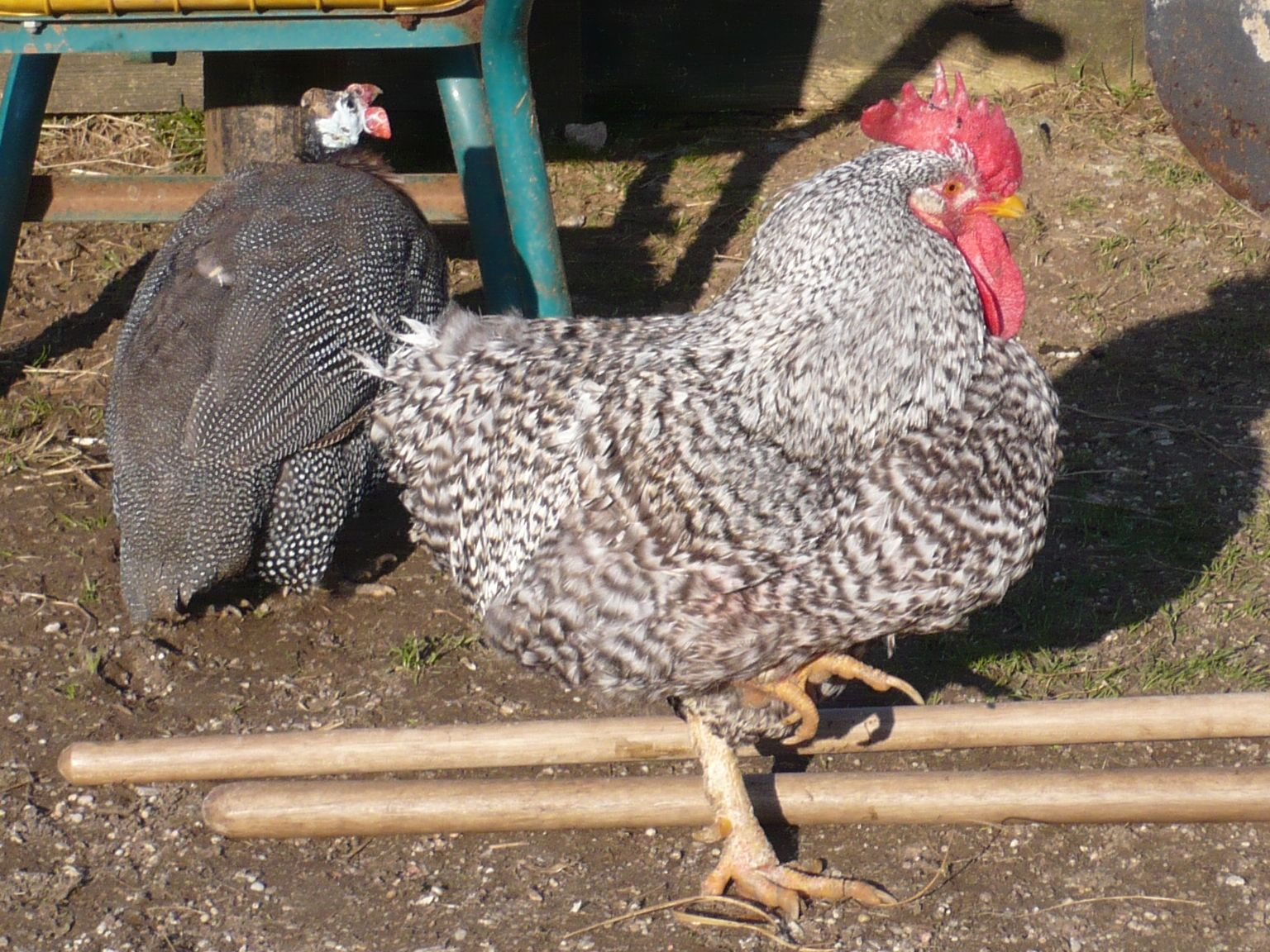
A Cantabrian Pedresa rooster with no tail feathers

- Andalusian, Andaluza Azul
- Cara Blanca
- Castilian, Castellana Negra
- Catalana, Catalana Del Prat or Prat Leonada
- Empordanesa
- Euskal oiloa
- Extremaduran, Extremeña Azul
- Indio de León
- Gallina Mallorquina
- Minorca, Gallina Menorquina
- Murciana
- Galiña de Mos
- Pardo de León
- Penedesenca
- Pedresa, Cuca, Franciscana or Cantabrian
- Piñeira
- Pita Pinta Asturiana
- Pitiüsa
- Spanish fighter, Combatiente español
- Utrerana
- Valenciana de Chulilla
- White-Faced Black Spanish

=== Sweden ===
- Åsbohöna
- Bohuslän-Dals svarthöna
- Gotlandshöna
- Hedemorahöna
- Ölandshöns
- Öländsk dvärghöna
- Orusthöna
- Skånsk blommehöna
- Svensk dvärghöna
- Silverudd Blue/Isbar

=== Switzerland ===
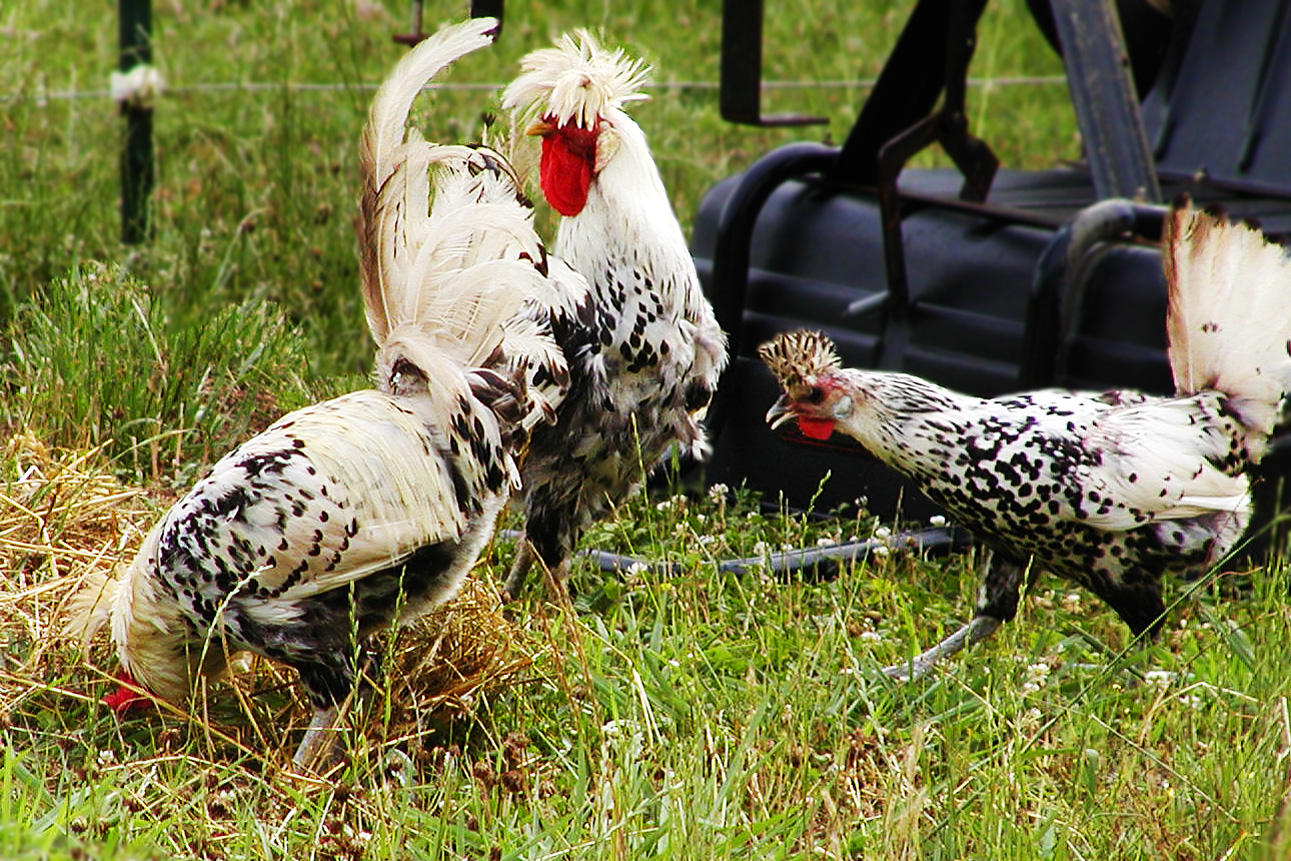
The Appenzeller Spitzhauben, a rare Swiss crested breed

- Appenzeller Barthuhn,
- Appenzeller Spitzhauben,
- Schweizer
- Zwerg-Appenzeller Barthuhn
- Zwerg-Schweizer,

=== Taiwan ===
- Taiwanese Game

=== Thailand ===
- Gai Chon
- Gai Puen Muang
- Pradu Hang Dum or Pradu Hang Dam Chiangmai
- Thai Game

=== Turkey ===
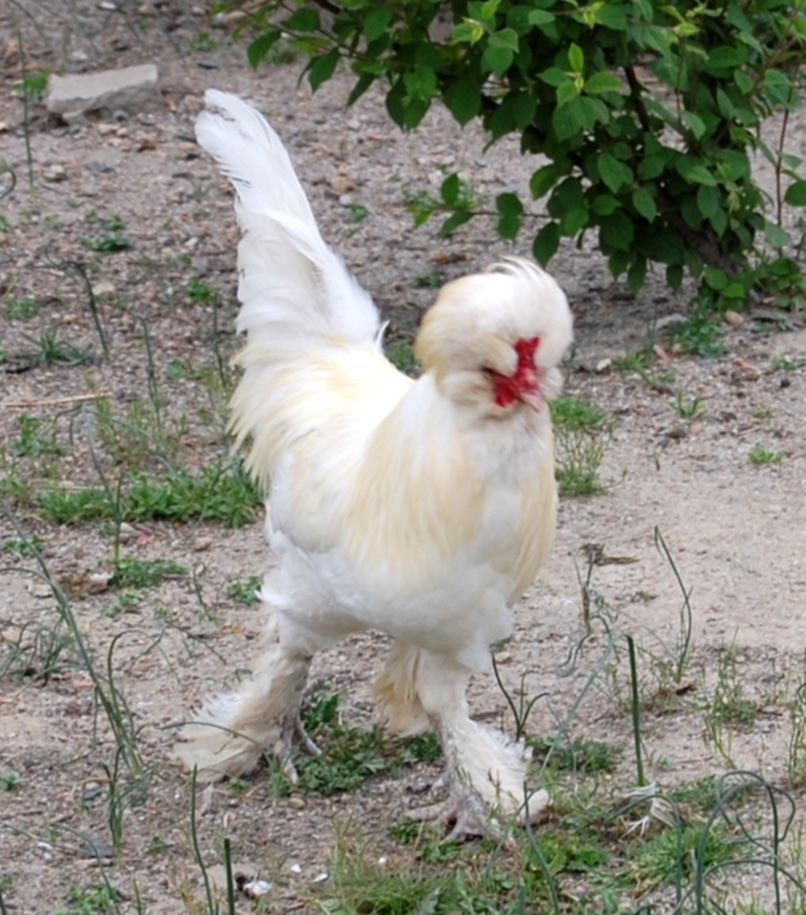
Turkish Sultan breed

- Abaza
- Denizli
- Gerze
- Hacikadin
- Sultan

=== Ukraine ===
- Poltava

=== United Kingdom ===
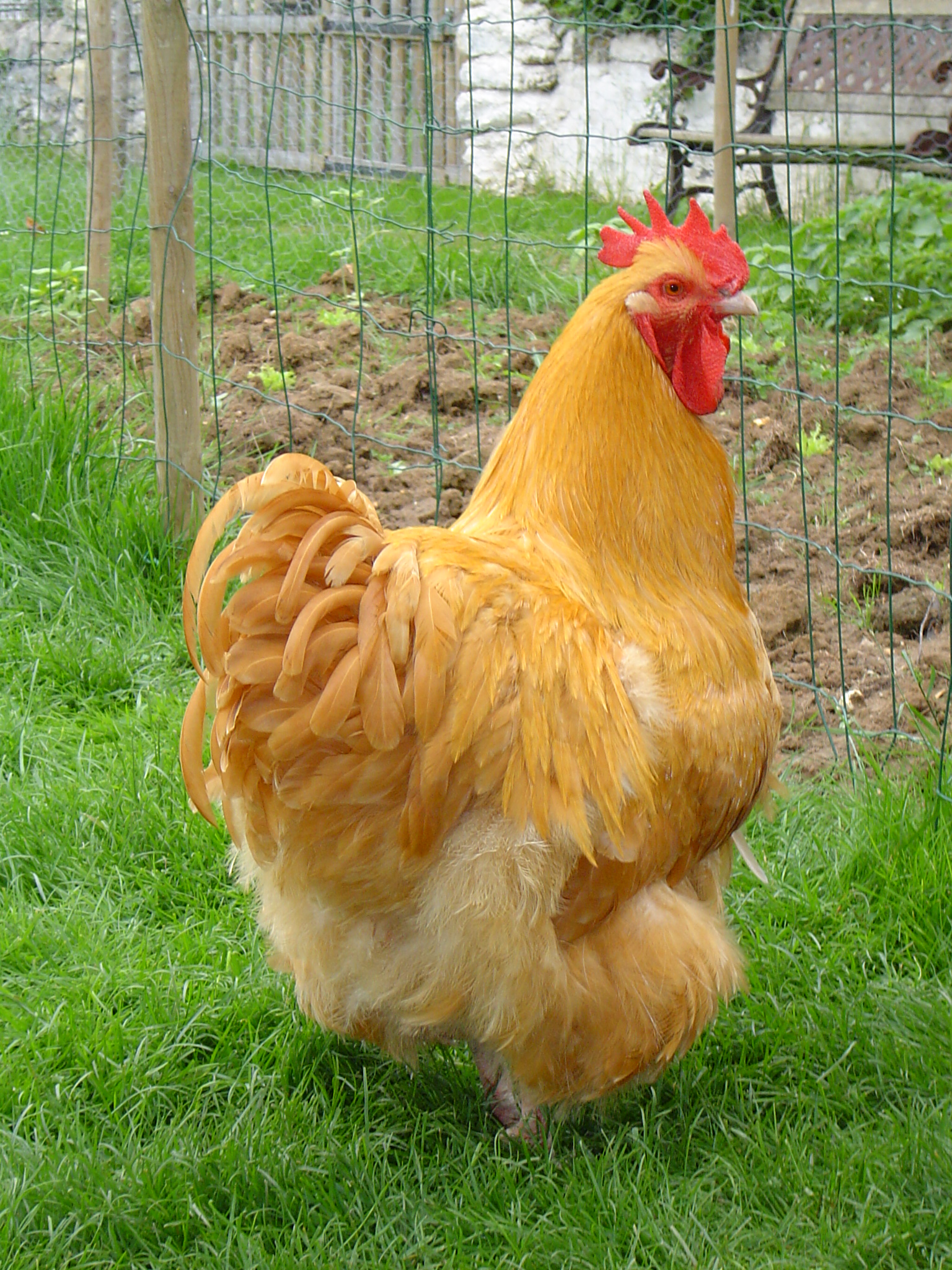
A buff Orpington cock

- Brockbar
- Brussbar
- Cambar
- Derbyshire Redcap
- Dorbar
- Dorking
- Indian Game
- Ixworth
- Legbar
- Marsh Daisy
- Modern Game
- Modern Langshan
- Muffed Old English Game
- Norfolk Grey
- Old English Game
- Old English Pheasant Fowl
- Orpington
- Rhodebar
- Rosecomb
- Scots Dumpy
- Scots Grey
- Sebright
- Sussex
- Welbar
- Wybar

=== United States of America ===
- Ameraucana
- American Game
- American Long Crower
- Buckeye
- Blue Hen of Delaware
- Brahma
- California Gray
- Delaware
- Dominique
- Holland
- Iowa Blue
- Java
- Jersey Giant
- Lamona
- Leghorn
- New Hampshire
- Plymouth Rock (or Barred Rock, Rock)
- Pyncheon
- Rhode Island Red
- Rhode Island White
- Wyandotte

=== Vietnam ===
- Ga Ac
- Ga Choi
- Ga Dong Tao
- Gà Hồ
- Ga Mia
- Ga Mong
- Ga Noi
- Ga Ri
- Ga Tau Vang
- Ca To
- Ga Tre
- H'mong
- Oke
- Phu Lu Te
- Te
- Tien Yen
- Vanphu

== By primary use ==
All chickens lay eggs, have edible meat, and possess a unique appearance. However, distinct breeds are the result of selective breeding to emphasize certain traits. Any breed may be used for general agricultural purposes, and all breeds are shown to some degree. But each chicken breed is known for a primary use.

=== Eggs ===
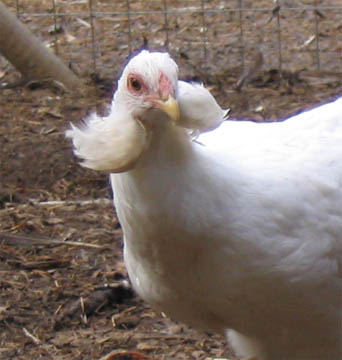
Araucana

Many breeds were selected and are used primarily for producing eggs, these are mostly light-weight birds whose hens do not go broody often.

- Ancona
- Andalusian
- Asturian Painted Hen
- Barnevelder
- Campine
- Catalana
- Easter egger
- Egyptian Fayoumi
- Norwegian Jærhøne
- Kraienköppe (Twentse)
- Lakenvelder
- Leghorn
- Marans
- Minorca
- Orloff
- Penedesenca
- Sicilian Buttercup
- White-Faced Black Spanish
- Welsummer
- Sombor Kaporka (Somborska kaporka)

=== Meat ===
Most farms and homesteads use dual-purpose breeds for meat production. Some breeds are raised mainly for meat:

- Bresse
- Cornish (a.k.a. Indian Game)
- Ixworth
- Jersey Giant

=== Dual-purpose ===
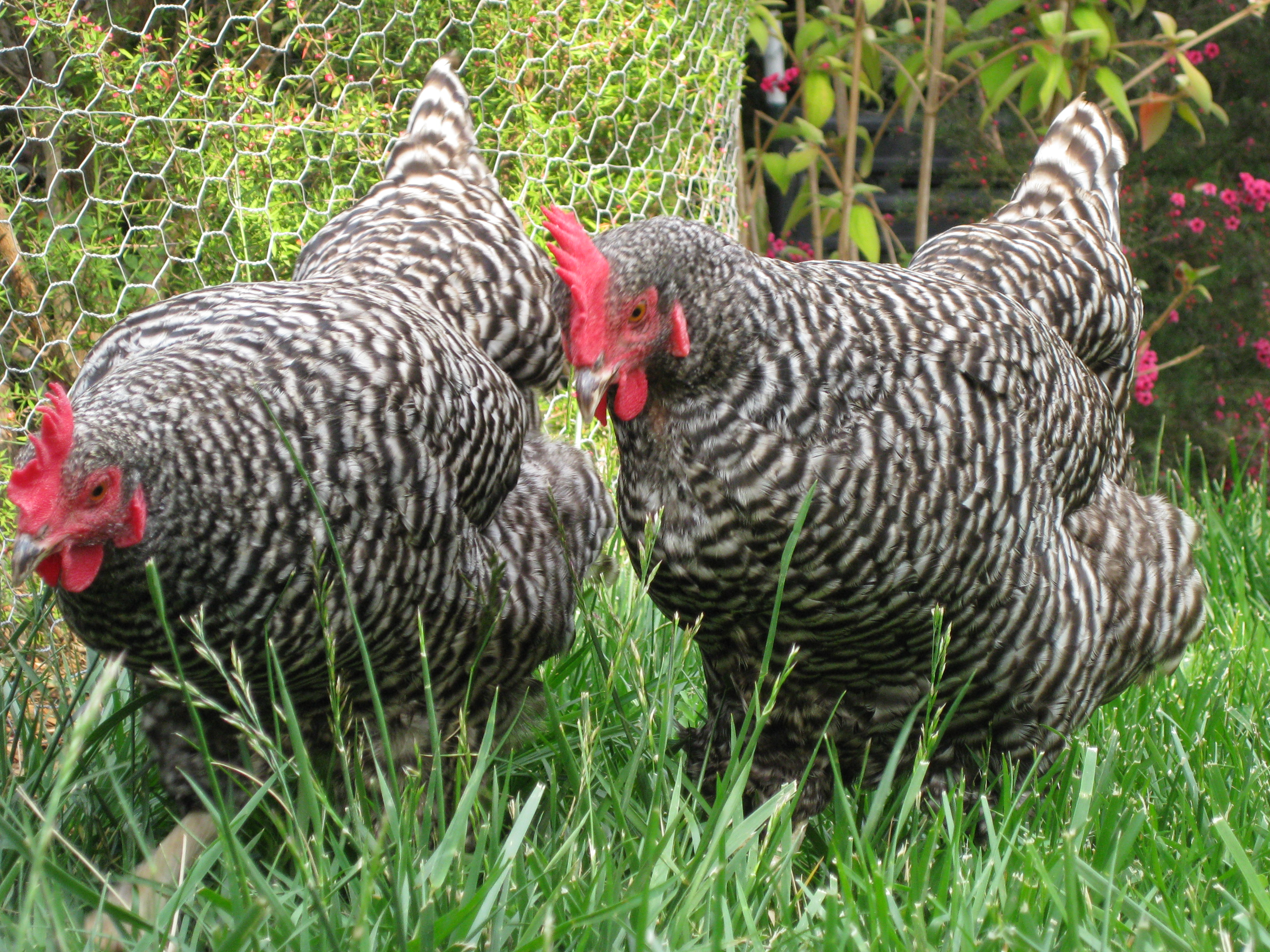
Dual-purpose Plymouth Rock

The generalist breeds used in barnyards worldwide are adaptable utility birds good at producing both meat and eggs. Though some may be slightly better for one of these purposes, they are usually called dual-purpose breeds.

- Australorp
- Barnevelder
- Brahma
- Braekel (Brakel)
- Buckeye
- California Gray
- Chantecler
- Cubalaya
- Derbyshire Redcap
- Dominique
- Dorking
- Faverolles
- Holland
- Iowa Blue
- Java
- Jersey Giant
- Marans
- Marsh Daisy
- Naked-neck
- New Hampshire
- Norfolk Grey
- Orpington
- Plymouth Rock
- Poltava
- Red Shaver
- Rhode Island Red
- Rhode Island White
- Sombor Kaporka (Somborska kaporka)
- Scots Dumpy
- Scots Grey
- Sussex
- Winnebago
- Wyandotte

=== Exhibition ===
Since the 19th century, poultry fancy, the breeding and competitive exhibition of poultry as a hobby, has grown to be a huge influence on chicken breeds. Many breeds have always been kept for ornamental purposes, and others have been shifted from their original use to become first and foremost exhibition fowl, even if they may retain some inherent utility. Since the sport of cockfighting has been outlawed in the developed world, most breeds first developed for this purpose, called game fowl, are now seen principally in the show ring rather than the cock pit as fighting cocks.

Key

^{U} denotes a breed primarily used for exhibition, but which is still used for utility purposes.

^{G} denotes a game breed.

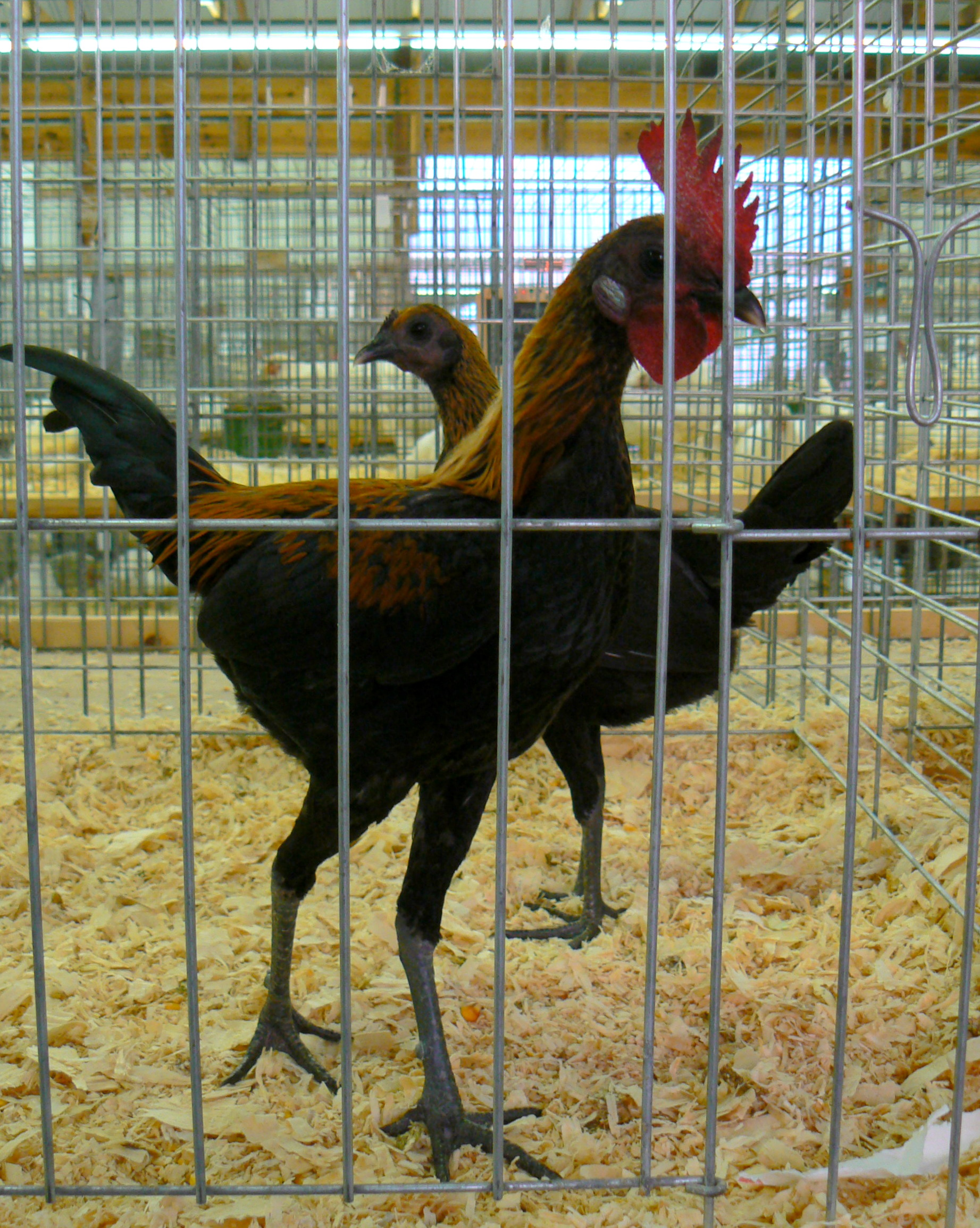
Modern Game chicken

- American Game ^{G}
- Asil ^{G}
- Appenzeller Barthuhn ^{U}
- Appenzeller Spitzhauben ^{U}
- Barbu de Watermael
- Belgian Bearded d'Anvers
- Bearded d'Uccle
- Belgian d'Everberg
- Blue Hen of Delaware ^{G}
- Booted Bantam
- Cochin
- Crèvecœur ^{U}
- Croad Langshan ^{U}
- Dragon Chicken ^{U}
- Dutch Bantam
- Frizzle
- Ga Noi^{G}
- Hamburg ^{U}
- Houdan ^{U}
- Japanese Bantam
- Jangmigye
- La Flèche ^{U}
- Malay ^{G}
- Modern Game
- Nankin
- Old English Game ^{G}
- Pekin
- Phoenix
- Polish ^{U}
- Rosecomb
- Sebright
- Serama
- Shamo ^{G}
- Silkie
- Sultan
- Sumatra
- Vorwerk ^{U}
- Yokohama

== Bantams ==
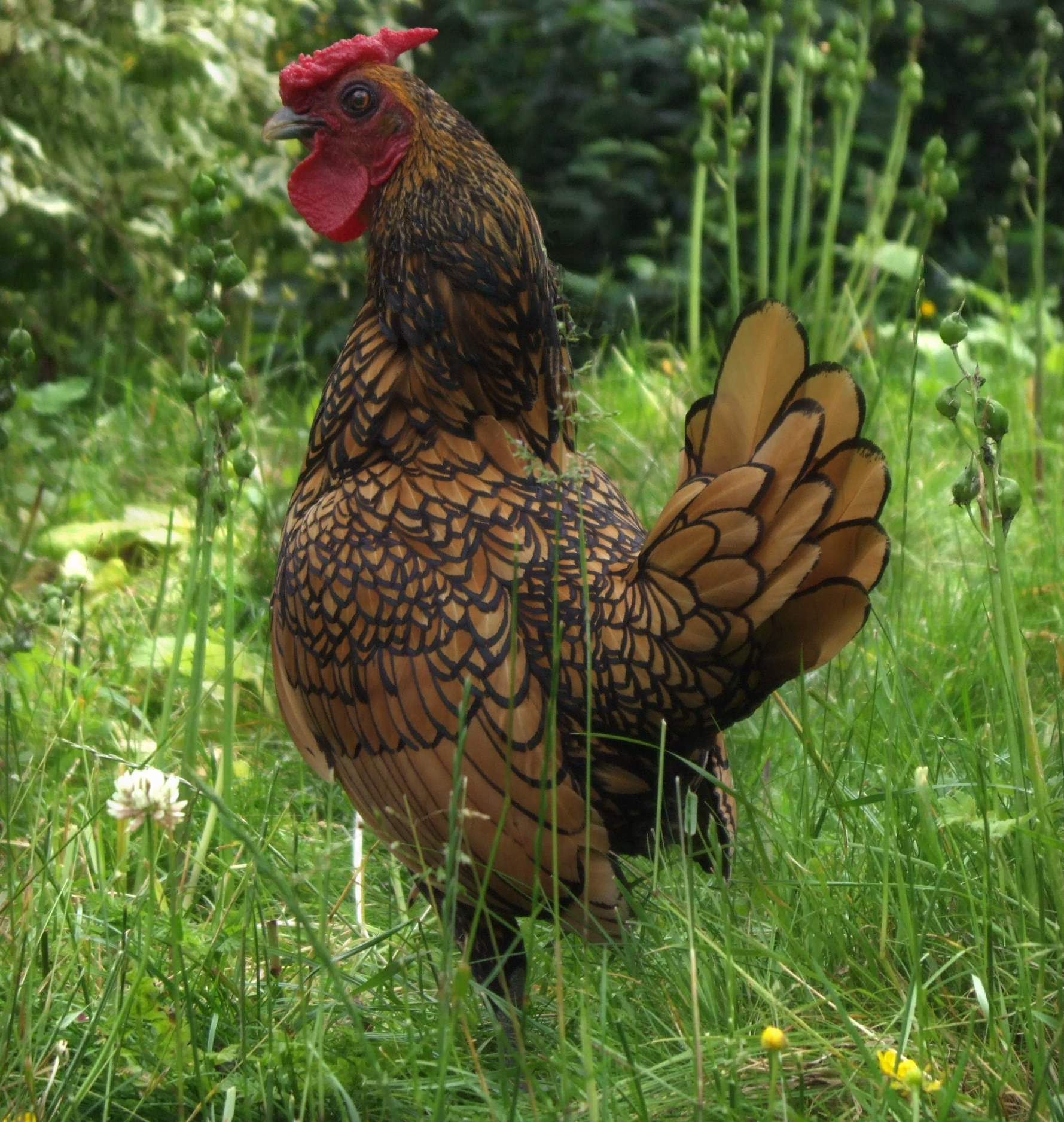
Golden Sebright cockerel

Most large chicken breeds have a bantam counterpart, sometimes referred to as a miniature. Miniatures are usually one-fifth to one-quarter the size of the standard breed, but they are expected to exhibit all of the standard breed's characteristics. A true bantam has no large counterpart, and is naturally small. The true bantams include:

- Bantam (Note: The original breed of bantam chicken is ancestor to all "bantam" breeds. It originated in Indonesia and there is called Ayam Kate.)
- Belgian Bearded d'Anvers
- Belgian Bearded d'Uccle
- Belgian d'Everberg
- Booted Bantam
- Dutch Bantam
- Japanese Bantam
- Nankin
- Pekin Bantam
- Rosecomb
- Sebright
- Serama

== Crossbreeds ==
Many common strains of crossbred chickens exist, but none breed true or are recognized by poultry breed standards; thus, though they are extremely common in flocks focusing on high productivity, crossbreeds do not technically meet the definition of a breed. Most crossbreed strains are sex linked, allowing for easy chick sexing.

- Black Sex Link (also called Black Stars or Black Rock in the UK)
- Red Sex Link (also called Golden Comet)
- ISA Brown
- Kuroiler
- Lohmann Brown
- Daisy Belle
- Dekalb Amberlink
- Columbian Rock
- Easter egger
- Broiler
- Cobb 500
- Ross 308
- Chunggye
- Delaware Blue Hen

== See also ==
- List of birds
- List of duck breeds
- List of goose breeds
- List of turkey breeds
- Chickens as pets
