= RSL chicken =

Crossbred chicken variety

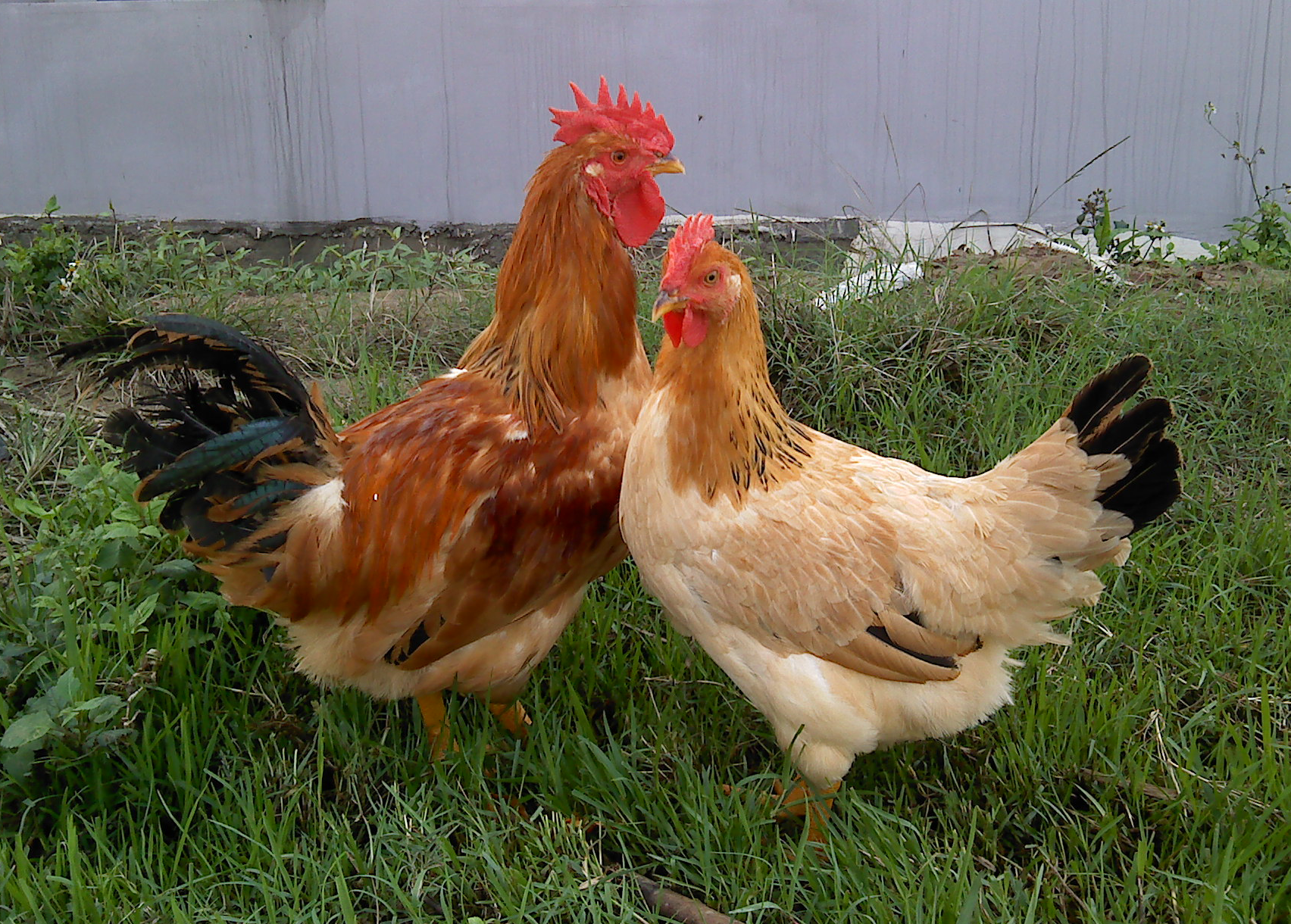
RSL chicken at 17 weeks of age

This chart shows: the volume of Ri chicken and RSL chicken period 1-17 weeks of age

The RSL chicken is a crossbred variety of chicken, derived from the chicken breeds Ri, Sasso, and Luong Phuong. The genotype composition is: 50% Ri, 25% Sasso, and 25% Luong Phuong.

== Fertility ==
RSL started laying eggs at 153 days of age; egg production to 52 weeks of age was 110.75 fruits / roof; FCR for 10 eggs was 2.31 kg / head Proportion of embryonated eggs, hatching rate and the rate of type 1 corresponding chicks were: 92.34%, 82.88%, 78.88%. Consumption and production costs chicks feed type 1 is: 0.472 kg/head and 5.136 VND/child.

== Ability to grow and for meat ==
RSL chicken (50% Ri, 25% Sasso, 25% Luong Phuong) commercial grow with increased survival from 94-95%. At the age of 15 weeks - 16 - 17, body weight is 1.621,98 RSL chickens - 1695.28 to 1748.18 g / head; chicken carcass ratio is 60,48 RSL - from 68.49 to 69.21%. Consumption and the cost of food for a kg increase in weight was 3.10 kilograms of meat and 32 119 RSL/kg. Chicken (75% Ri, Sasso 12.5%, 12.5% Luong Phuong) slaughtered at 15 weeks of age for the highest efficiency.

Gà RSL at 01 day age
