= Hồ chicken =

Breed of chicken

- Other names: Ho; Ga Ho; gà Hồ
- Country of origin: Vietnam

Classification
- Chicken; Gallus gallus domesticus

The Hồ or Gà Hồ is a Vietnamese breed of chicken, originating in Bắc Ninh Province. It is one of many local chicken varieties in Vietnam including: gà Ri (the most popular breed), gà Tàu Vàng, gà Nòi, gà Đông Tảo, gà Mía, gà Tam Hoàng, gà Lương Phượng, etc.
