= Potchefstroom Koekoek =

Breed of chicken

- Conservation status: Vulnerable
- Country of origin: South Africa

Traits
- Weight: Male: 4.2 kg; Female: 3.6 kg
- Skin color: Yellow
- Egg color: Brown
- Comb type: Red

Classification
- Chicken; Gallus gallus domesticus

The Potchefstroom Koekoek is a South African breed of chicken developed in the 1960s at the Potchefstroom Agricultural College in the city of Potchefstroom by Chris Marais. It was developed by cross breeding a number of other breeds like Black Australorp, White Leghorn, and Barred Plymouth Rock to obtain specific characteristics of each, making the resulting breed more suitable to Southern African conditions.

The breed was intended as a dual purpose, free ranging chicken with laying capabilities as well as a large structure for meat production. Pure Koekoeks have a black-and-white barred appearance, with the chicks sexable soon after hatching due to distinct sex markings. Potchefstroom Koekoeks maintain good egg production even with poor quality or insufficient feeding.

== See also ==
- List of chicken breeds
- Agriculture in South Africa
