= Gramapriya =

Breed of chicken

Gramapriya is a breed of chicken developed by the Project Directorate on Poultry based in Hyderabad. The Gramapriya starts laying eggs at an age of 175 days. In 72 weeks a Gramapriya chicken can lay 200–225.

== See also ==
- List of chicken breeds
