= Sentul chicken =

Breed of chicken

- Other names: Ayam sentul; Hayam sentul
- Country of origin: Indonesia
- Distribution: Western Java
- Use: Meat, eggs

Traits
- Weight: Male: 1.5 - 3.5 kg; Female: 0.8 - 2.2 kg
- Skin color: White to grey
- Egg color: Peach to light orange
- Comb type: Single

Classification

Sentul chicken (Indonesian: Ayam sentul) is a chicken breed originated from Indonesia. It is first developed in Ciamis Regency, West Java. Sentul is a dual-purpose breed, to provide both meat and eggs. It is considered as having higher growth rate and immunity to diseases compared with other Indonesian breeds. It is estimated the hatchling of this breed could reach maturity in about 12 weeks.
