= Ga Noi =

Breed of chicken

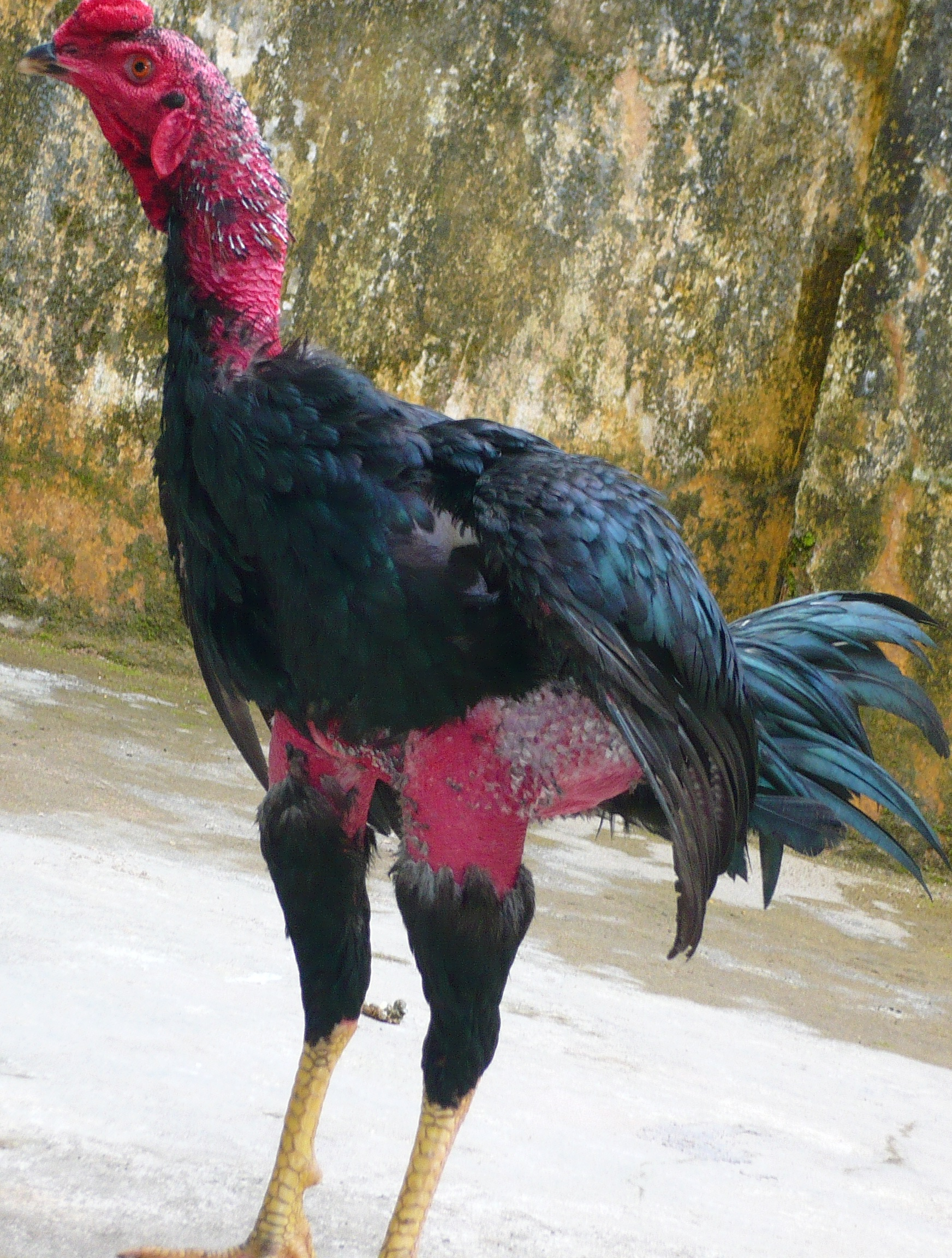
A Ga Noi cock

The Ga Noi, or Ganoi, is a breed of chicken originating in Vietnam. Originally used for cockfighting, is a breed that fits the gamecock type, with an upright body and aggressive temperament. Ga Noi appear in both a regularly feathered variety and a Naked Neck-like variety. It was exported to the West for the first time in the early 1990s, and is not yet accepted into poultry breed standards, such as the American Poultry Association's Standard of Perfection. Ga nois are a hard-feather breed.

The ga noi is 1 of 3 main chickens in Vietnam; the other two, the ga tre and ga rung, are also used for fighting. The ga rung are a caught wild, while the ga tre and ga noi are domesticated.

== See also ==
- List of chicken breeds
