= Jangmigye =

Breed of chicken

Ginkkori-dak
- Conservation status: Study
- Country of origin: Korea
- Use: Exhibition breed

Traits
- Weight: Male: 1.2–1.8 kg; Female: 0.8–1.3 kg
- Skin color: Yellow
- Egg color: Light Brown
- Comb type: Single

Classification
- Chicken; Gallus gallus domesticus

- Jangmigye
- Hangul: 장미계
- Hanja: 長尾鷄
- RR: jangmigye
- MR: changmigye

Alternate name
- Hangul: 긴꼬리닭
- RR: ginkkoridak
- MR: kinkkoridak

The Jangmigye (Korean: 장미계), also known as the Ginkkori-dak (긴꼬리닭; lit. 'long-tail chicken'), is one of the heritage breed of chicken from Korea that noted for its long tail. Males of this breed can have tails of up to 1.5 metres (4.9 ft) in length. The breed is estimated to have arisen in Korea in the middle of the third century. The Ginkkoridak is listed by the United Nations' Food and Agriculture Organization.

== History ==
The breed has existed since ancient Korea but almost disappeared in the early 1900s due to the introduction of commercial chicken farming with non-native breeds. One farmer is believed to have obstinately maintained the Ginkkoridak; as of 2021, there are 250 individuals held in conservancy.

== Breed comparison ==
Unlike the Onagadori, a Japanese breed of long-tailed chicken, the tail feathers of the Ginkkoridak cocks molt annually after the rainy season.
