= Dong Tao chicken =

Breed of chicken

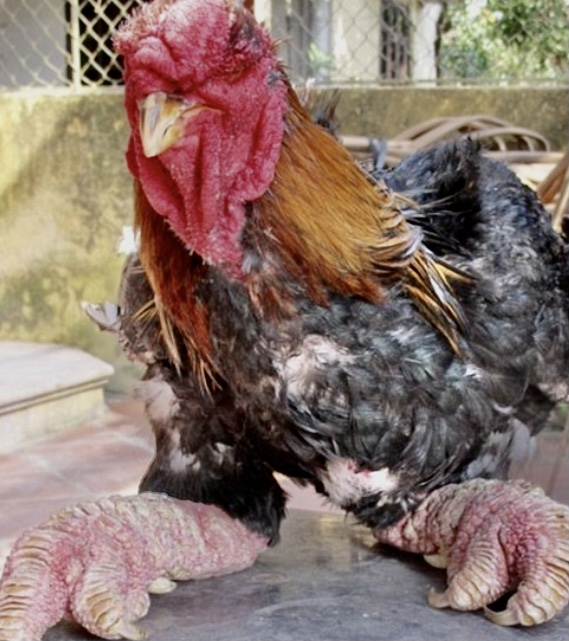
- Rooster
- Other names: Dragon Chicken; gà Đông Tảo
- Country of origin: Vietnam

Traits
- Weight: Male: 5.5–6 kg (12–13 lb); Female: 4.5 kg (9.9 lb)

Classification
- Chicken; Gallus gallus domesticus

Dong Tao chicken (Vietnamese: gà Đông Tảo), also called Dragon Chicken, is a rare Vietnamese chicken breed with enlarged feet, that originates from the village Đông Tảo in Khoái Châu District near Hanoi.

Dong Tao chickens are valued as a delicacy in Vietnam, and they were once bred exclusively to be served to the royal family and mandarins. They are difficult to breed as their large legs make hatching difficult and they are also sensitive to changes in temperature. Hens often break the eggs with their bulky legs, so eggs are usually kept in an incubator. It takes eight months to one year until the chickens are ready for slaughtering at three to five kilograms of weight, although the males can reach six kilograms. Its meat may be priced at 350,000-400,000 VND per kilogram.
