= Daisy Belle =

Hybrid bird

The Daisy Belle is a chicken crossbreed developed from the Rhode Island Red and the Sussex. It is also known as the Pied Sussex, and Merrydale Pied amongst other names. All of the aforementioned are practically the same crossbreed, but with a different name from each breeder.

== Details ==
The Daisy Belle lays 240 to 300 eggs per year on average. It has a silvery white plumage around its neck and head and a black body. They are relatively large, suiting free-range conditions and to a lesser extent, battery conditions.

== Area of development ==
The Daisy belle was first bred in England, and today are still mainly found in that region. They are fairly popular in other areas of the United Kingdom and North America.

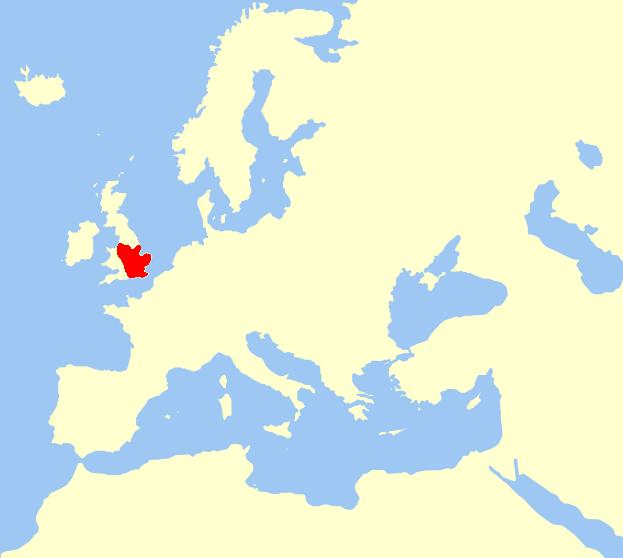
The area of development of the Daisy belle
