= Vanaraja =

Breed of chicken

- Country of origin: India
- Distribution: India
- Use: Dual: eggs & meat

Traits
- Weight: Female: 2–2.2 kg (4–5 lb)

Classification

Vanaraja is a dual-purpose chicken variety developed by the ICAR-Directorate of Poultry Research (formerly Project Directorate on Poultry) in Hyderabad, India. Vanaraja is aimed a rural communities where it can be reared in backyard on natural, scavenged food with minimal supplementation. It produces eggs and meat based on rearing and feeding practices. Important features of this breed are multi-color feather pattern, immunity to disease, requiring less nutrition, growing faster, and producing more eggs.

Vanaraja give their best performance when reared free range. They each produce up to 110 eggs per year, and weigh 1.0 to 1.2 kilograms (2.2 to 2.6 lb) at age 6 to 6 1/2 months. Vaccination of native birds along with Vanaraja is recommended. Excess body weight may reduce egg production. Vanaraja are mainly found in Telangana and Andhra Pradesh and are supplied to 26 states of India from ICAR-DPR, Hyderabad.
