= Ayam Kedu =

Breed of chicken

- Country of origin: Indonesia

Traits
- Weight: Male: 2-3.5 kg; Female: 1.8-2.7 kg
- Skin color: black
- Egg color: white or tinted

Classification
- Chicken; Gallus gallus domesticus

Ayam Kedu is a breed of chicken, originating in Indonesia. It is one of the ancestors of Ayam Cemani

== Name ==
Ayam means chicken in Indonesian language and Kedu is name of village on Kedu Plain on Central Java.

== Description ==
A medium sized hard-feathered bird. Mainly three varieties known- (1) Kedu Kedu- a large white-skinned bird with a large red or black comb; (2) Kedu Cemani- a medium-sized black-skinned and black combed bird and (3) Kedu Hsian- a partridge variety with white skin and a red comb. Another variety also known to be existed, but its description can't be collected.

Plumage colors: black, white and partridge.

Weight: Rooster: 2.27 – 3.63 kg. Hen: 1.18 – 2.72 kg.

Purposes: Considered as a ritual bird in Indonesia. Also, Chinese uses the bird as medicine. Lays around 160 standard brown eggs per year.

== Varieties of Kedu Chicken ==
1. Kedu black chicken, whole body and black feathers and cloaca retaining red coloration
2. Kedu white chicken, with white coat color
3. Kedu red chicken, with a furry black and red comb
