= Stara Zagora Red =

Breed of chicken

- Conservation status: SAVE, 2009: critical
- Other names: Bulgarian: Старозагорска червена кокошка; Starozagorska chervena kokoshka; Starozagorska Red Hen
- Country of origin: Bulgaria
- Use: eggs

Traits
- Weight: Male: 3–3.5 kg; Female: 2.3–2.5 kg
- Skin color: yellow
- Egg color: brown

Classification
- Chicken; Gallus gallus domesticus

The Stara Zagora Red (Bulgarian: Старозагорска червена кокошка, Starozagorska chervena kokoshka) is a Bulgarian breed of domestic chicken from the oblast of Stara Zagora, in the central-southern part of the country. In the mid-20th century local chickens of Stara Zagora were crossed with Rhode Island Red chickens.

== History ==
The Stara Zagora Red breed was created in about 1970 by cross-breeding local hens of the region, of various colours, with Rhode Island Red cocks. The red colour became fully established after the second generation. The initial results were published in 1969.

Nowadays it is considered to be a rare breed. Its conservation status was listed as "critical" by the SAVE Foundation in 2009. It is kept by Bulgarian Poultry Institute in Stara Zagora and a few Bulgarian breeders, members of the Bulgarian Poultry Breeders Association. In 2013 the total number for the breed reported to DAD-IS was 360.

== Characteristics ==
The Stara Zagora Red is a medium-built bird with bright red feathering, a broad straight back, full breast and well-developed wattles and comb. Cocks weigh about 3–3.5 kg and hens 2.3–2.5 kg. Hens start laying at about 165 days, and lay 215–220 brown eggs per year, with a weight of 55–60 g.
