= Giriraja =

Breed of chicken

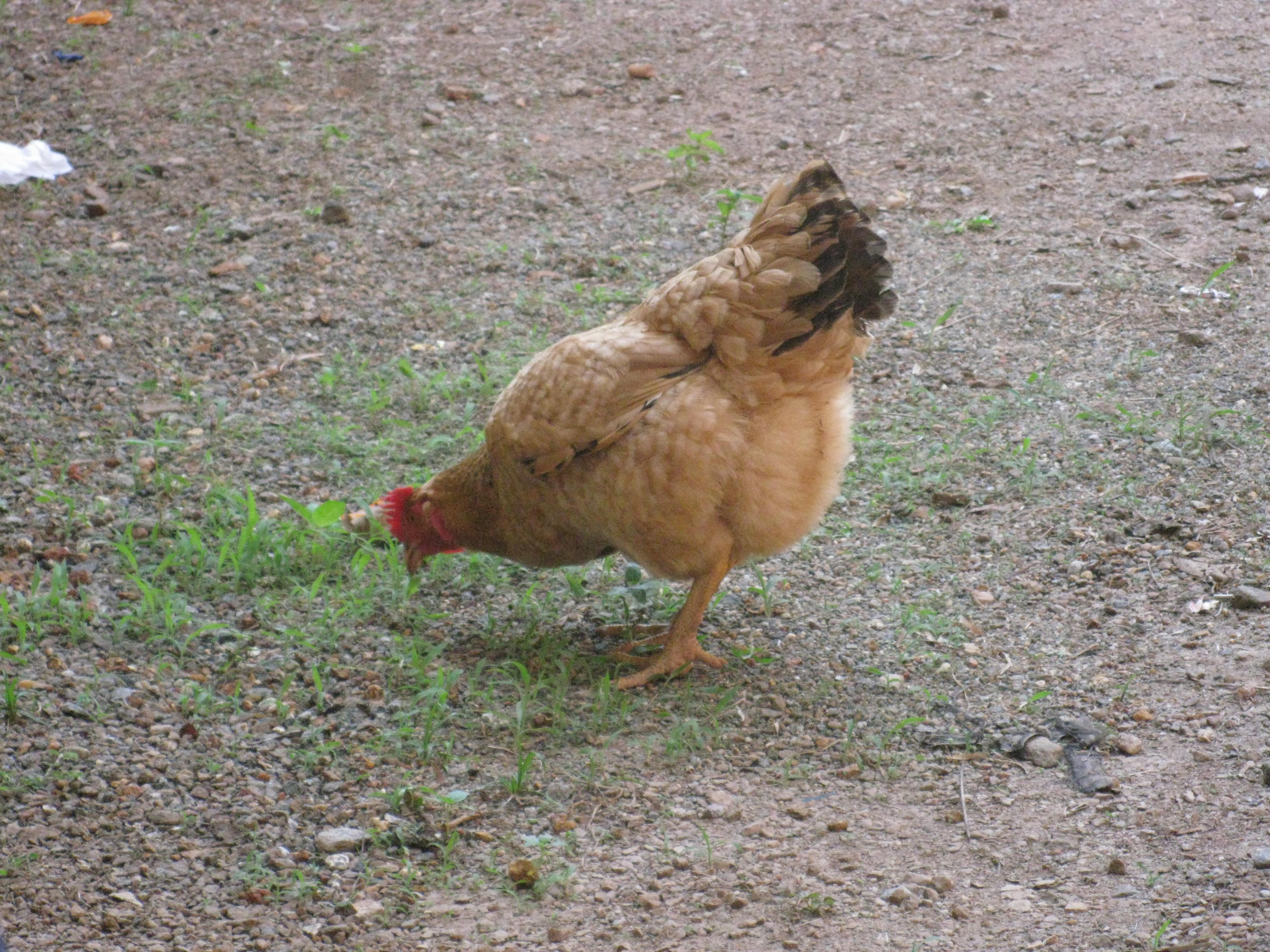
- Country of origin: India
- Use: Dual: eggs & meat

Traits
- Weight: Male: 3–4 kg (7–9 lb); Female: 2–3 kg (4–7 lb)

Classification

Giriraja is a breed of chicken developed by Karnataka Veterinary, Animal, and Fisheries Sciences University in Bengaluru, India. It was developed from crossing pure line exotic birds to have the desired traits that resemble desi birds.

== Characteristics ==
Giriraja is dual purpose poultry breed and achieved average weight gain of about 3 kg in hens and 4 kg in cocks at 6 months of age and eggs production is 180-190 per year with average egg weight 52-55 g. The eggs have a good hatchability (80–85 per cent), and enable farmers to raise their own stock. Their shells are brown in color and thicker than that of other commercial eggs, and resist breaking. A day-old chick weighs 42–45 g. The birds exhibit better growth compared to local varieties, and are suited for mixed and backyard farming.

For backyard rearing, a flock of five hens and one rooster is ideally grown. No special care is required to grow them. They can be raised as free range birds and can be fed with locally available materials. Being good scavengers, they feed on a variety of insects and green foliage. They can also be fed on farm and kitchen waste. The birds are resistant to many diseases, an exception being Ranikhet disease (also called Newcastle disease).
