= Ayam Pelung =

Breed of chicken

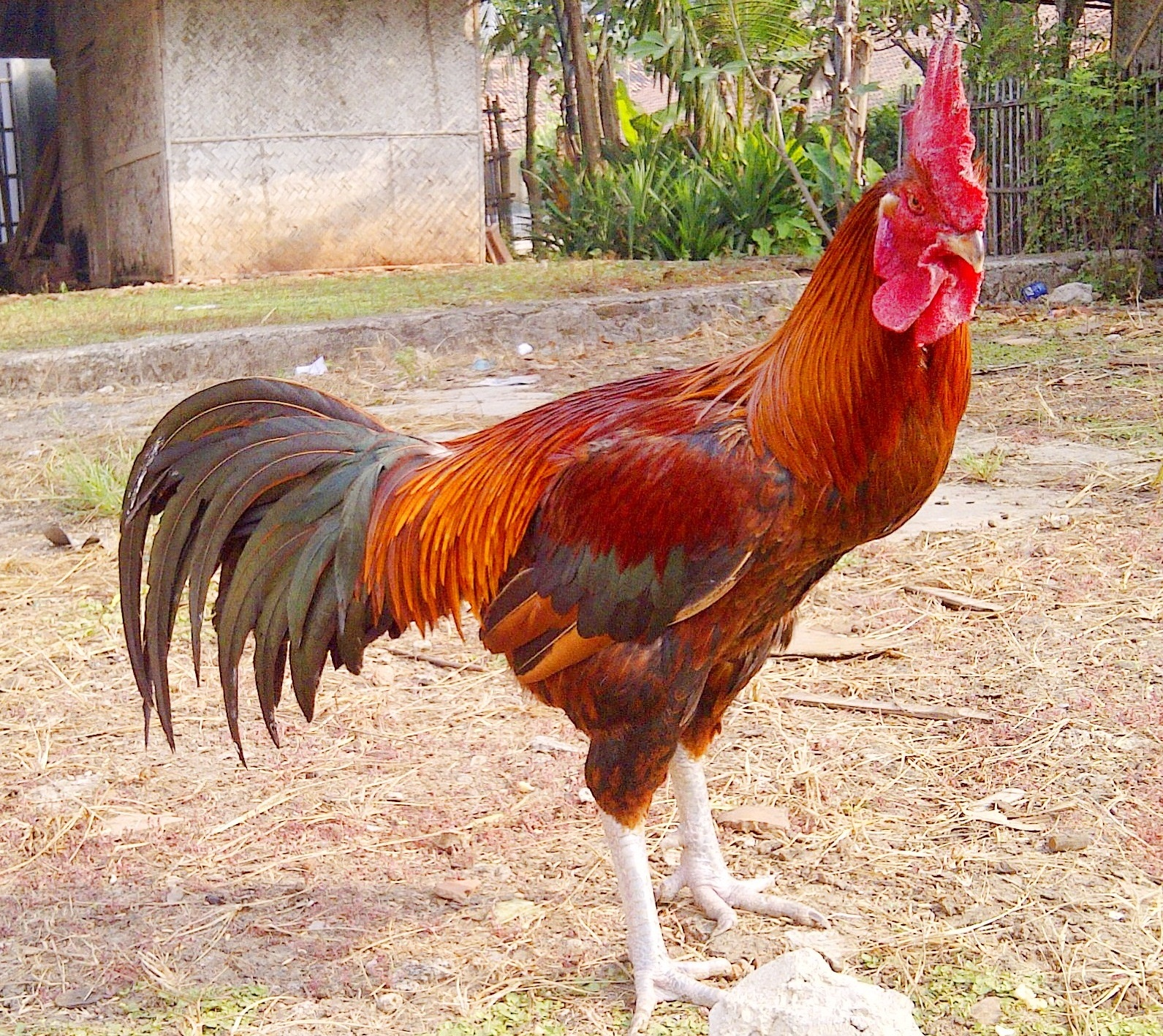
Cock

Ayam Pelung or Pelung Chicken (Pelung long crower) is a poultry breed from Cianjur, Indonesia. The males (roosters) are considered to be "singing chickens", with contests being frequent in the Pelung area for the most melodious crowing. A full grown male may weigh 3-6 kg (7-14 lb) and stand up to 50 cm (18 in) tall. A full grown female may weigh 2-4 kg (5-9 lb)

According to local myth, in 1850 H. Djarkasih (Mamak Acih), who was a local chicken hobbyist, teacher, and farmer in Bunikasih Village, Cianjur, Indonesia, found a young male chick in his garden and raised it. It matured quickly and uttered a long and melodious crow. Mamah Acih called it Ayam Pelung.

== Features ==
=== Great Size and Posture ===
The Ayam Pelung is known for its large size and straight posture. A full-grown cock will reach 11-13 lbs and a hen 8 lbs. Their large size and quick growth rate makes them good broiler chickens.

=== Rapid Growth and Weight Gain ===
The Ayam Pelung grows very quickly compared with most other domestic poultry breeds..

=== Exceptional Crow ===
Ayam Pelung chickens have very long crowing.
