= Nixi chicken =

Indigenous breed of chicken in Yunnan, China

Nixi chicken are an indigenous breed of chicken in Yunnan, China.

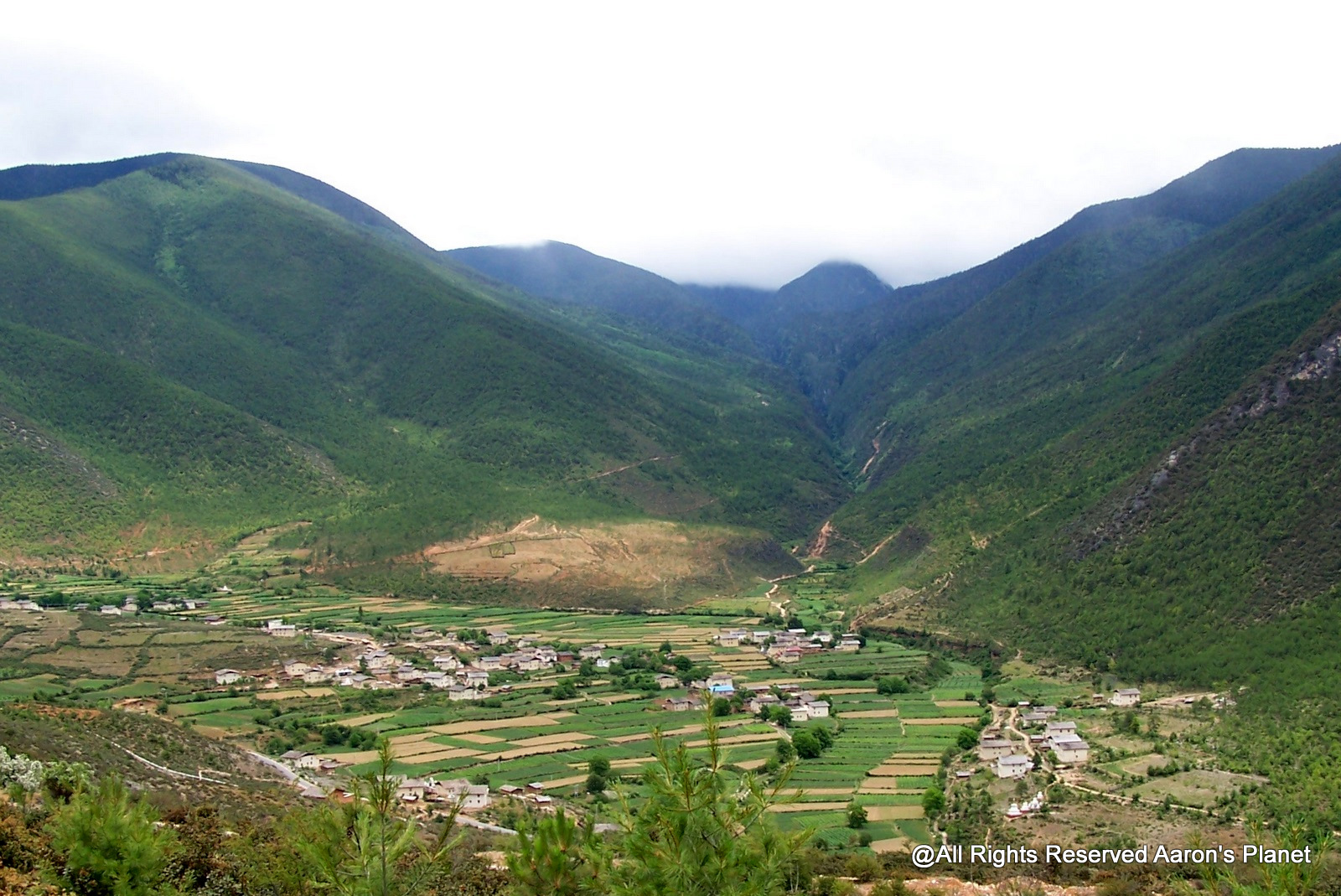
The village of Nixi, where the breed originated

They are small and well adapted to living in a cold climate. Chicken soup made with Nixi chicken is a local delicacy.
