= Lohmann Brown =

Breed of chicken

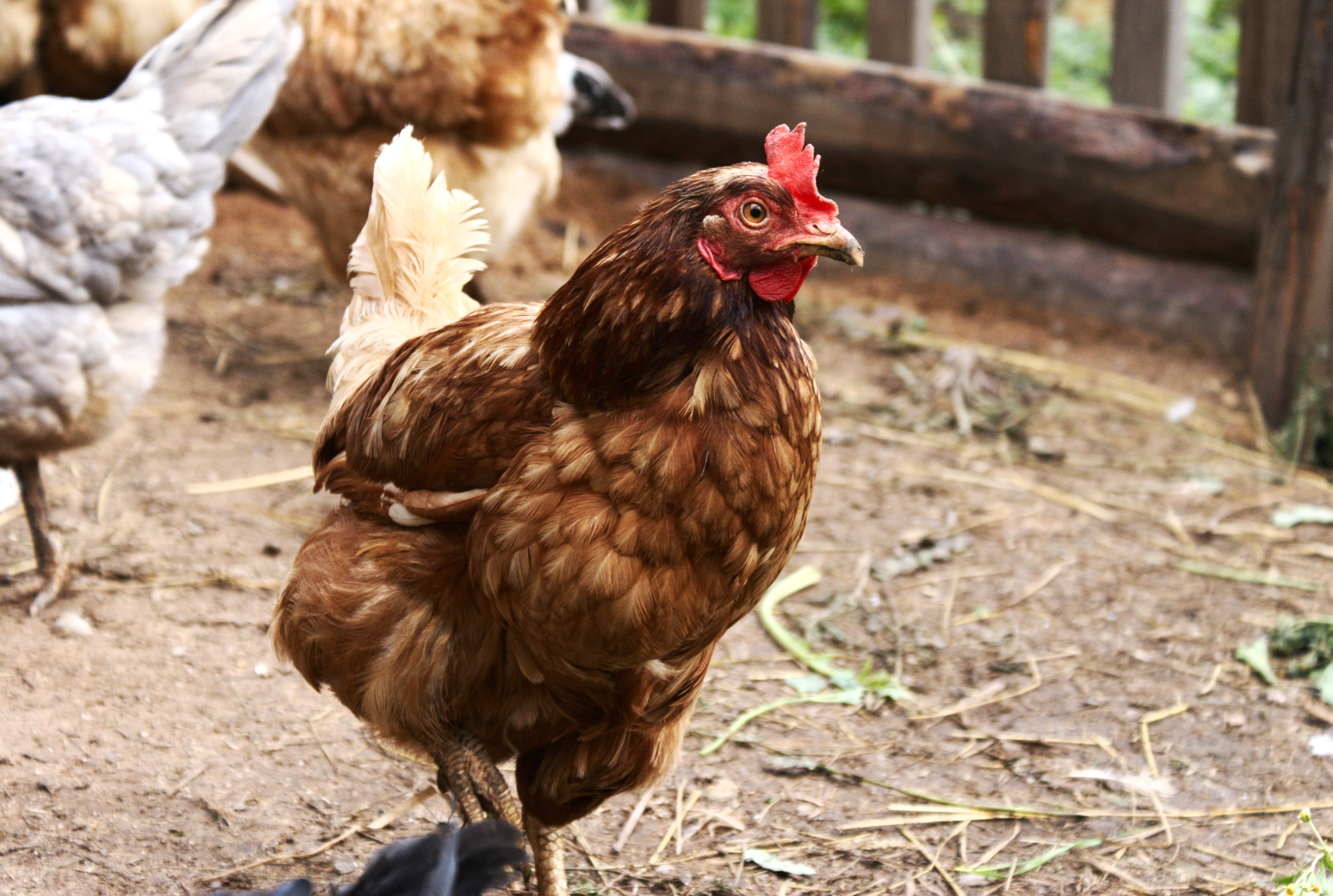
A Lohmann Brown hen

The Lohmann Brown is a brown variety of chicken, specifically bred for egg-laying purposes. It is a crossbred line and is selectively bred from lines of the Rhode Island breed. They start to lay eggs at about 19 weeks and produce up to 320 eggs up to an age of 72 weeks (one year production). Eggs are laid nearly daily, normally during the morning hours.

The breed was developed by Lohmann Tierzucht in 1984 and is a common commercial layer, being one of the most popular breeds used in the British egg industry.

Most Lohmann Browns have a caramel/brown shade of feathers with white feathers in a pattern round their necks and white feathers at the tips of their tail.
