= Chicken breeds recognized by the American Poultry Association =

The chicken breeds recognized by the American Poultry Association are listed in the American Standard of Perfection. They are categorized into classes: standard-sized breeds are grouped by type or by place of origin, while bantam breeds are classified according to type or physical characteristics.

== Large breeds ==
The large breeds are divided into six classes – American, Asiatic, Continental, English, Mediterranean, and All Other Standard Breeds – largely according to their place of origin.

=== American ===
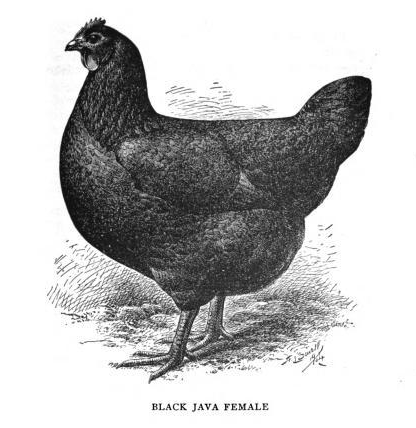
A Black Java hen; the Java played a role in the creation of some of the American class breeds, such as the Rhode Island Red.

The American Class contains thirteen breeds which originated in Canada or the United States. All are heavy breeds, and most lay brown eggs; most are cold-hardy:

- Buckeye
- Chantecler
- Delaware
- Dominique
- Holland
- Java
- Jersey Giant
- Lamona
- New Hampshire
- Plymouth Rock
- Rhode Island Red
- Rhode Island White
- Wyandotte

=== Asiatic ===
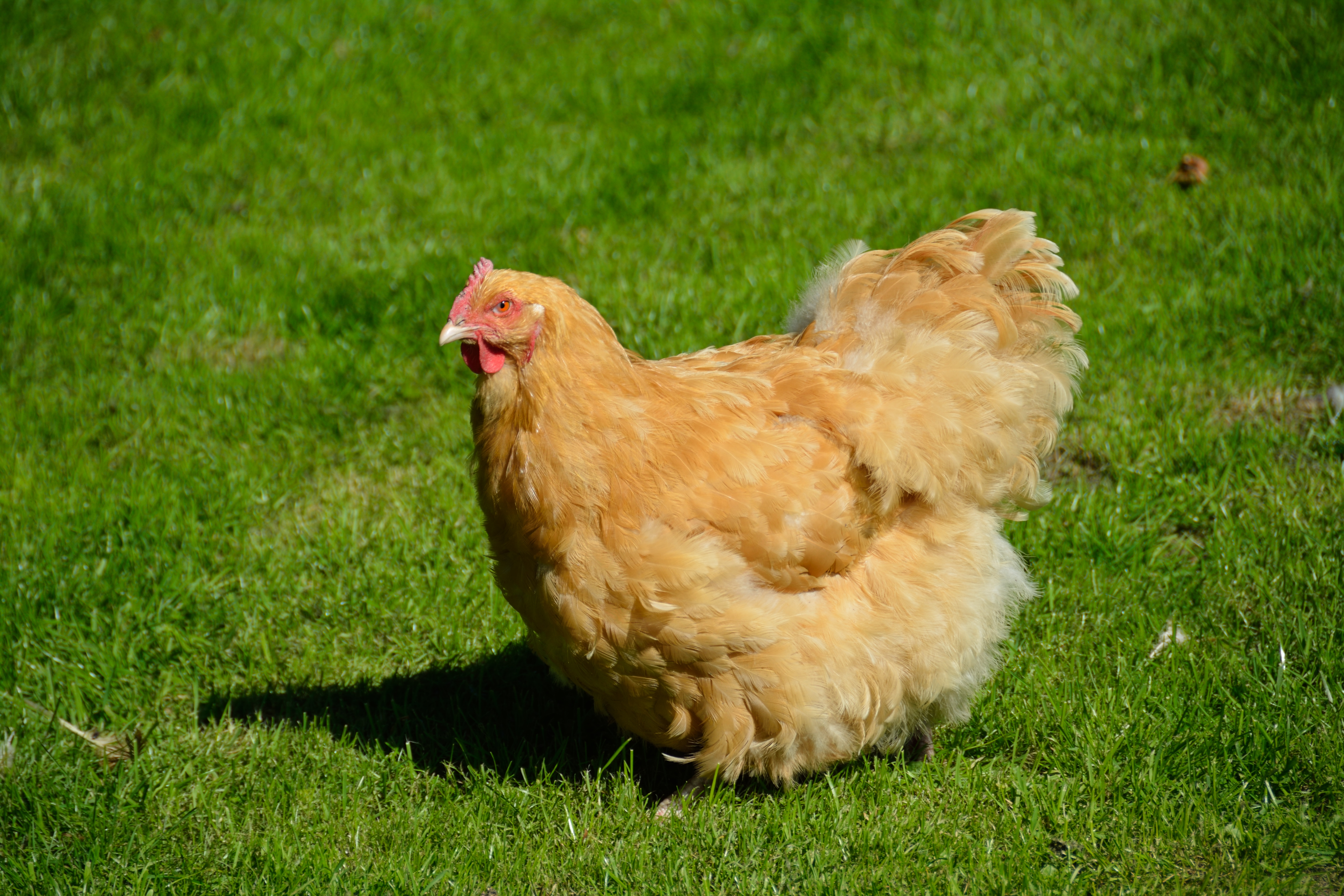
Cochin hens (a Buff hen seen here) are renowned for their broodiness.

These three breeds originate in China; they are large, feather legged, and lay brown eggs:

- Brahma
- Cochin
- Langshan

=== Continental ===
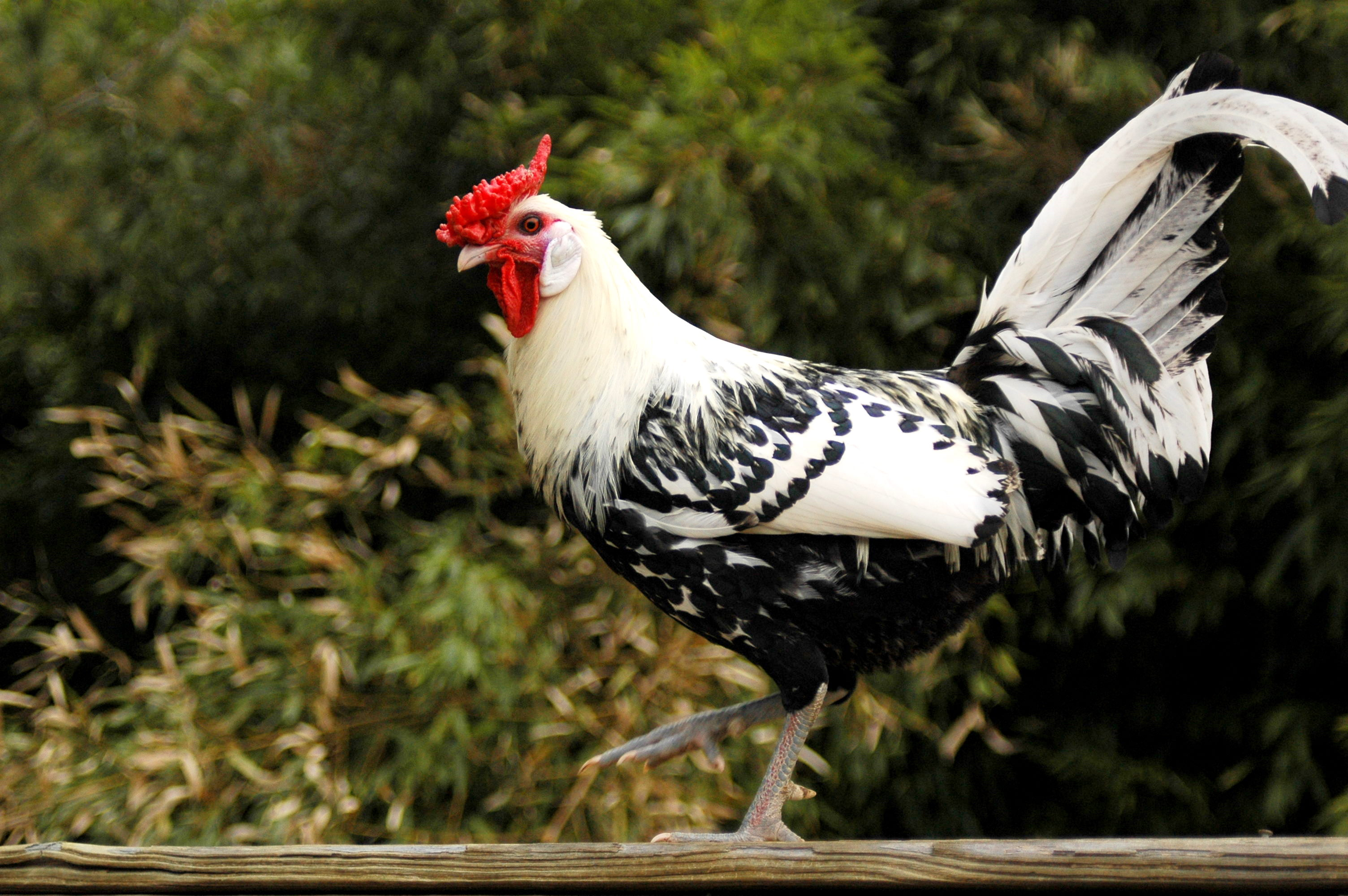
Most Continental breeds, such as the Silver Spangled Hamburg cock seen here, are lively birds that are often skilful flyers.

This group consists of eleven breeds from Belgium, France, Germany, and the Netherlands. They are mostly sprightly birds, the Faverolles being an exception:

- Barnevelder
- Campine
- Crevecoeur
- Faverolles
- Hamburg
- Houdan
- La Fleche
- Lakenvelder
- Marans
- Polish
- Welsummer

=== English ===
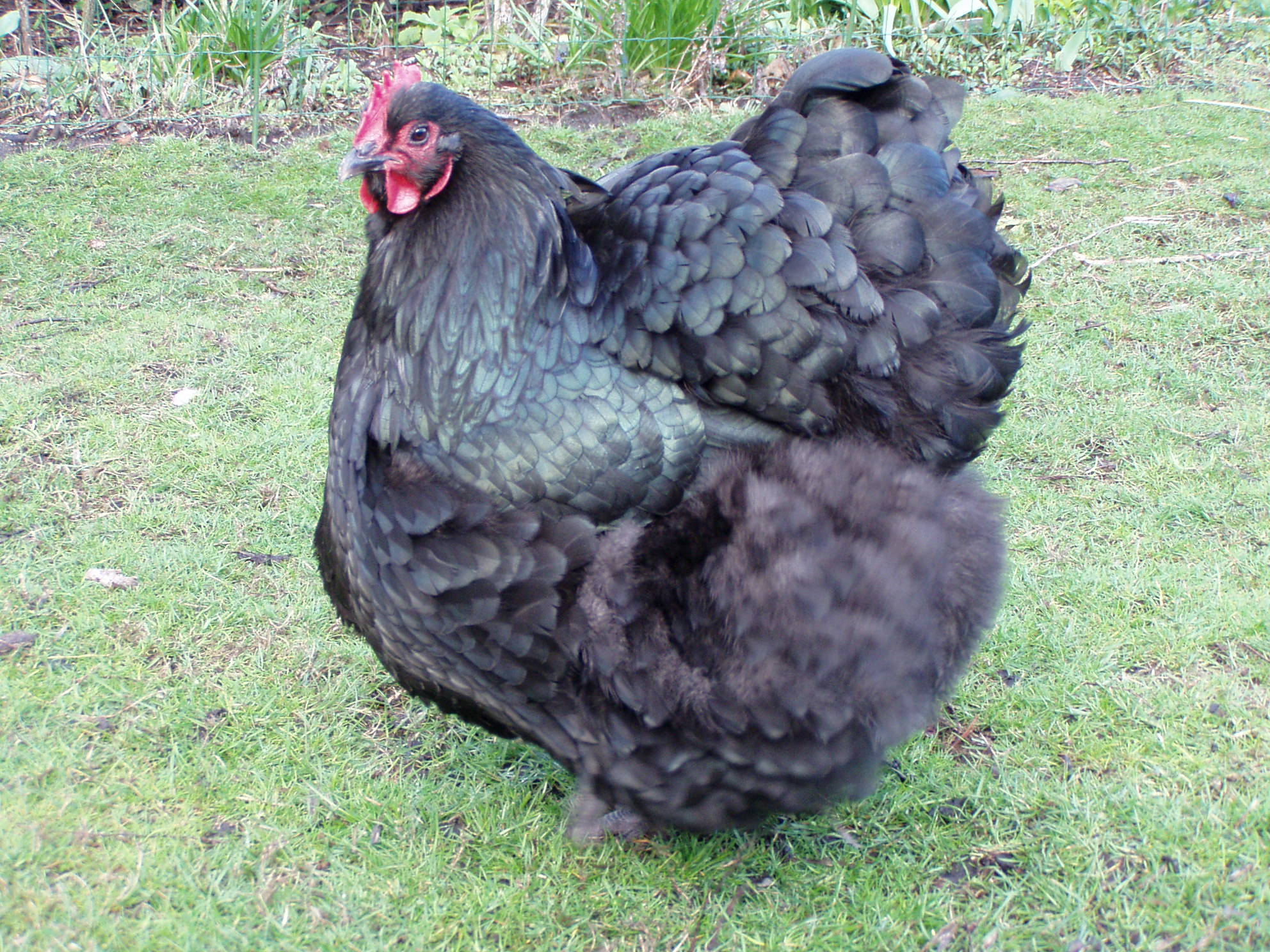
A Black Orpington hen

This class consists of five breeds from the United Kingdom and one from Australia:

- Australorp
- Cornish
- Dorking
- Orpington
- Redcap
- Sussex

=== Mediterranean ===
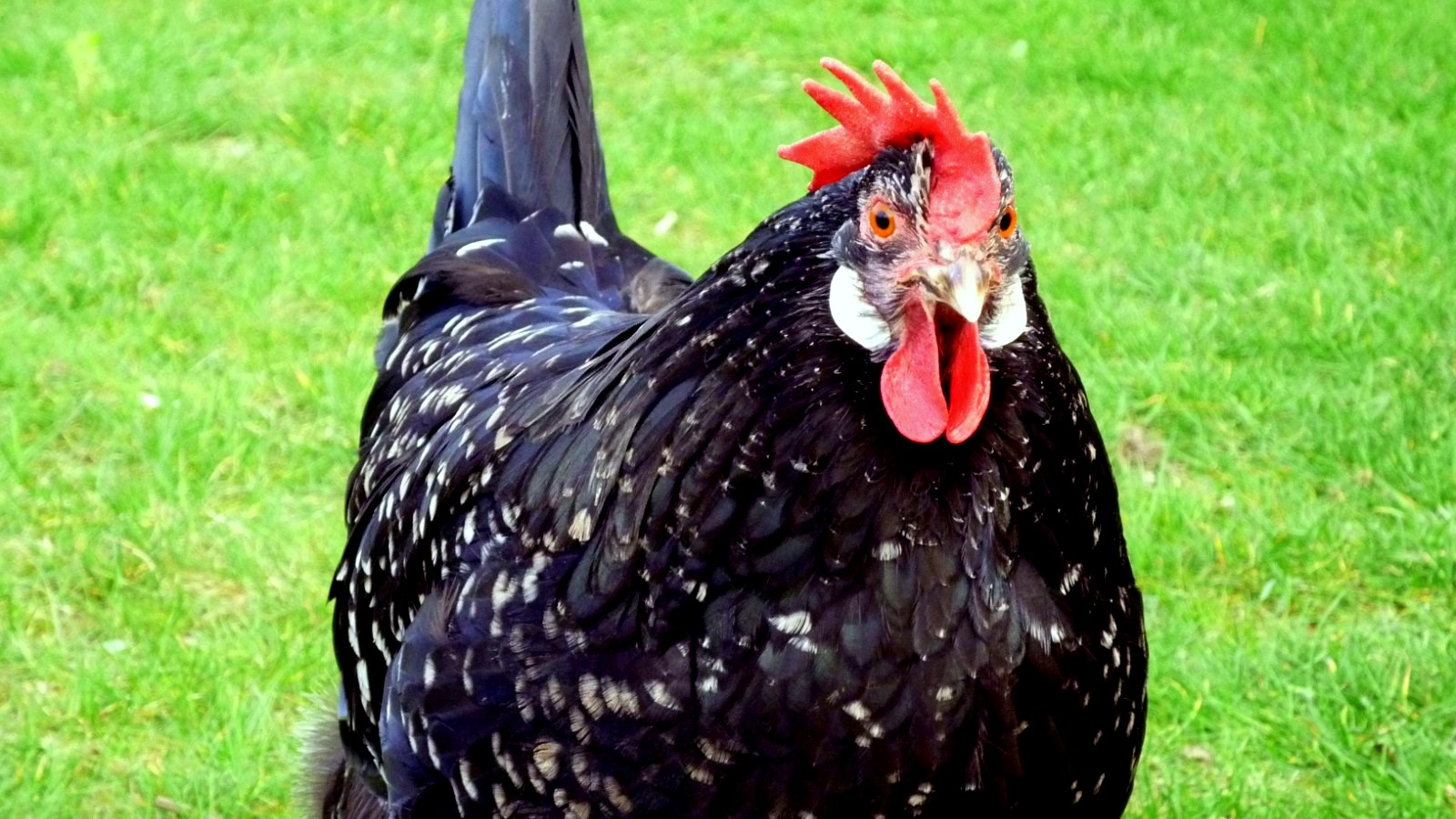
An Ancona hen; The large combs and wattles of the Mediterranean breeds, especially of the male, are highly susceptible to frostbite.

These breeds originating in Italy and Spain have white earlobes and tend to be productive layers of white eggs. In general they are flighty, and exceptional free-range birds, with both evasion and foraging skills:

- Ancona
- Andalusian
- Catalana
- Leghorn
- Minorca
- Sicilian Buttercup
- White-faced Black Spanish

=== All other standard breeds ===
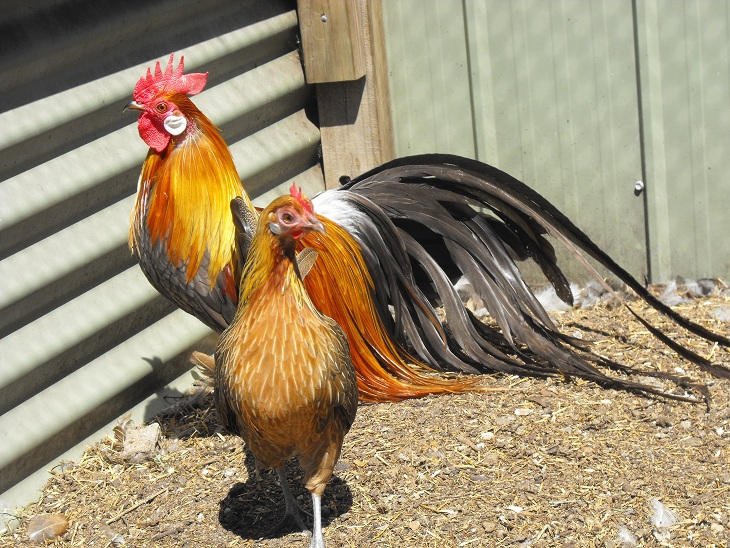
A Phoenix cock and hen

Other breeds are grouped in this class, which has three subclasses: Game, Oriental, and Miscellaneous. The Game subclass includes the non-oriental game birds, the Oriental subclass includes mainly birds from Asia; the Cubalaya, however, is from Cuba. The Miscellaneous subclass holds the remaining breeds.

==== Game ====
- Modern Game
- Old English Game
- American Game

==== Oriental ====
- Aseel
- Cubalaya
- Malay
- Phoenix
- Shamo
- Sumatra
- Yokohama

==== Miscellaneous ====
- Ameraucana
- Araucana
- Naked-neck
- Sultan

== Bantam breeds ==
Bantams are grouped according to type or physical appearance into six classes:

=== Modern game ===
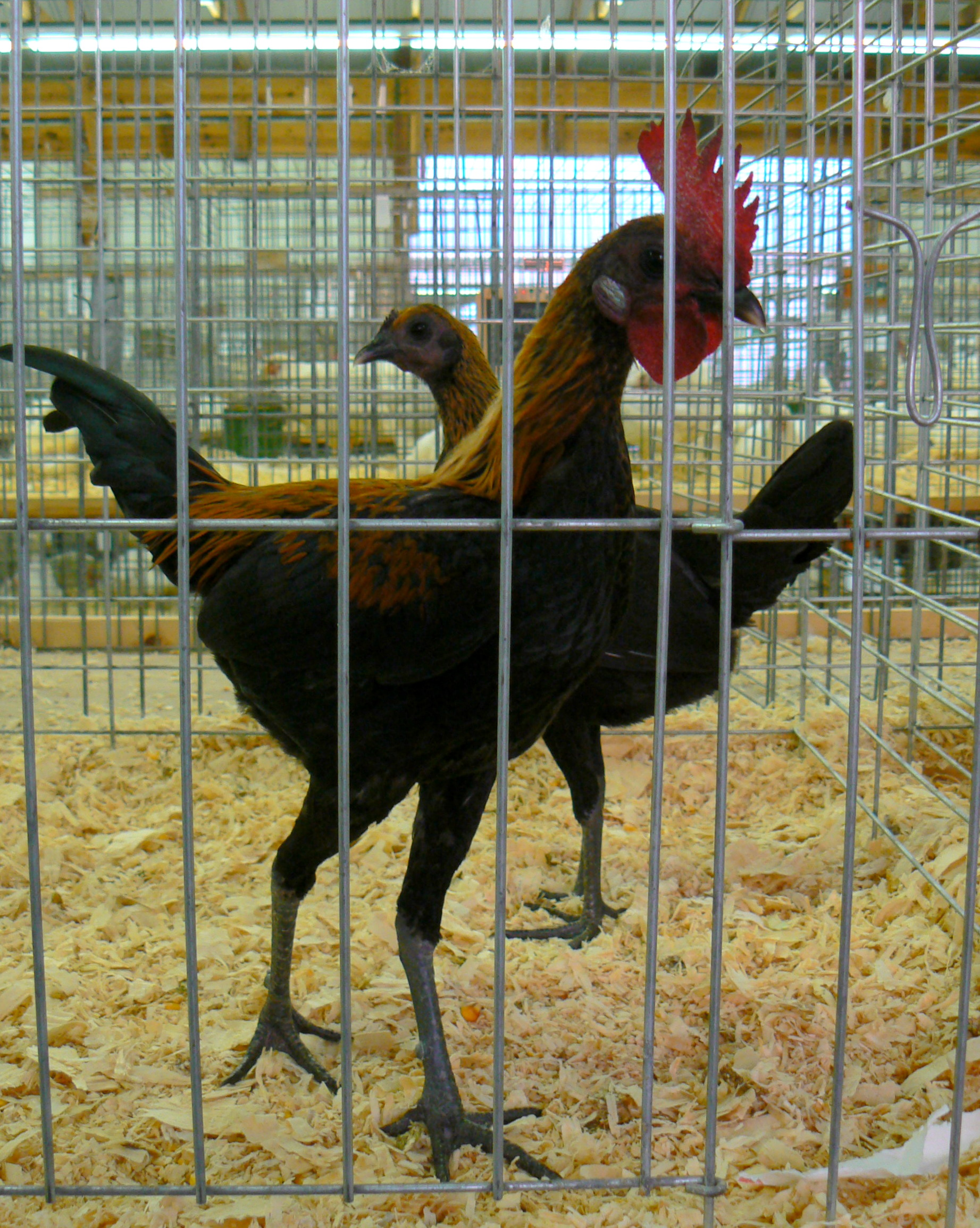
Brown red Modern Game cock and hen; the cock's comb and wattles are normally dubbed for show.

This class consists solely of the Modern Game bantam.

=== Game ===
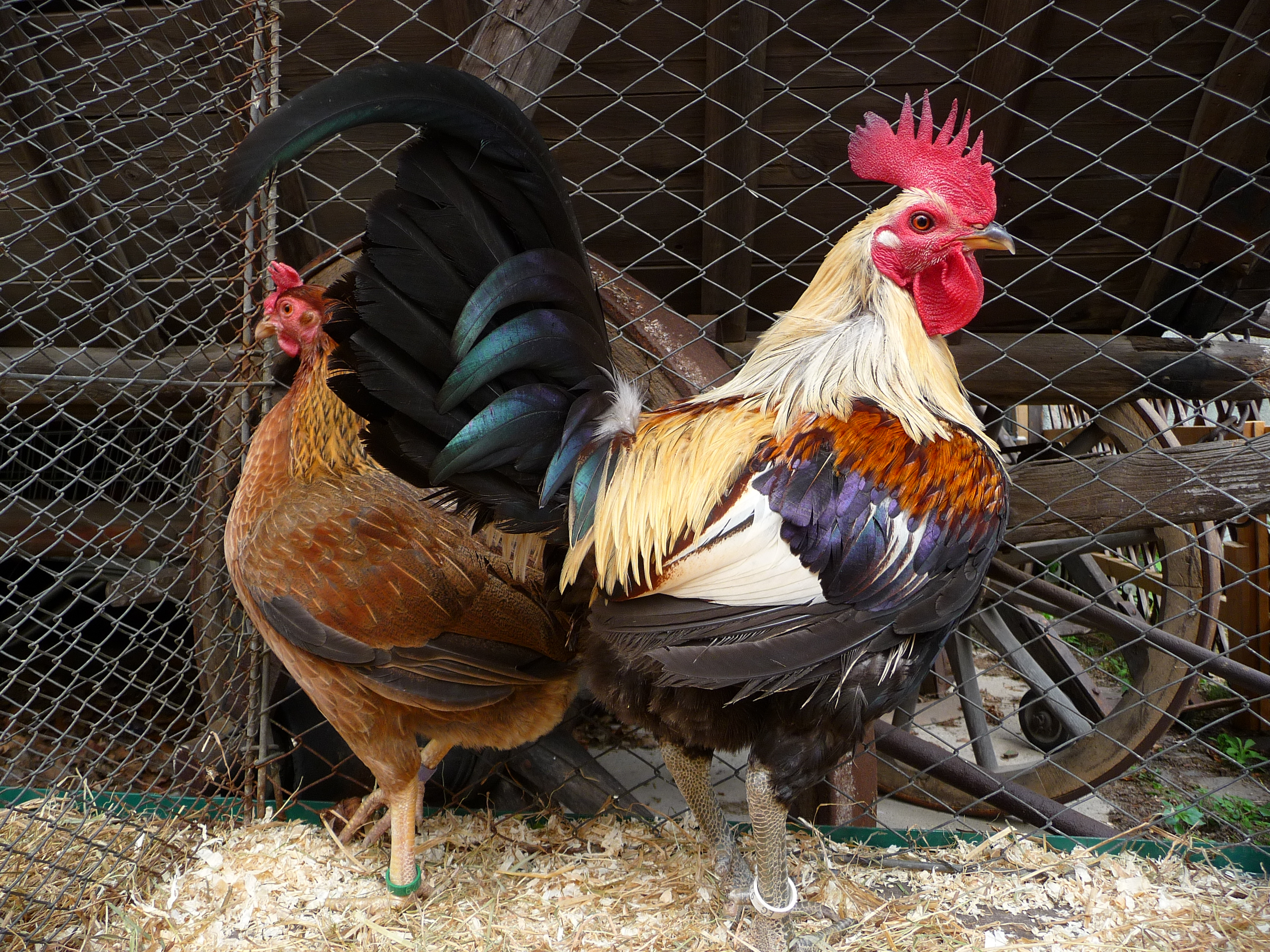
A pair of Old English Games

The Game class includes the remaining game bantams:

- American Game
- Old English Game

=== Single comb clean-legged ===
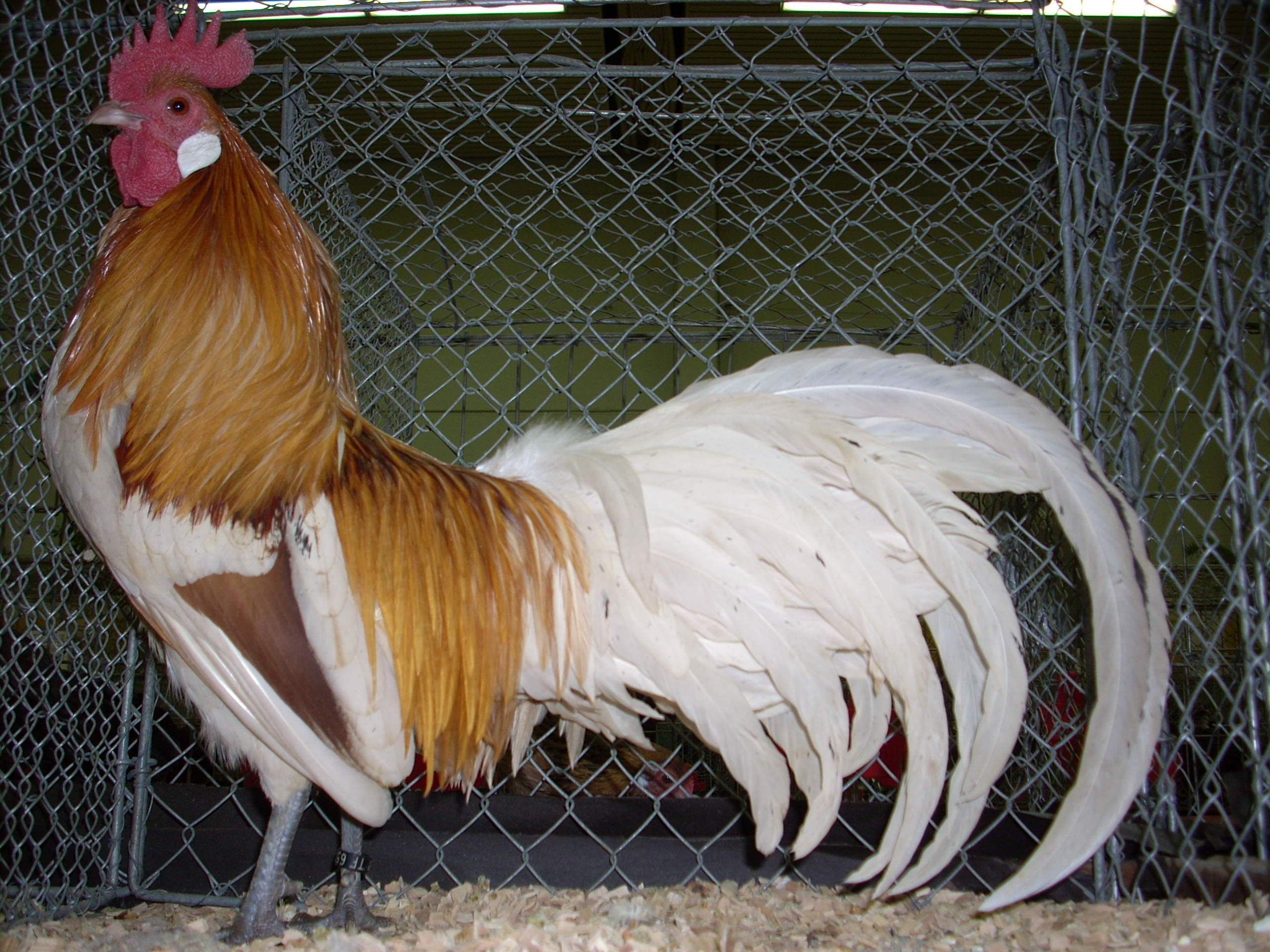
A red pyle German Bantam cock

This class contains all the bantam breeds with a single comb, excluding the game bantams:

- Ancona (single comb)
- Andalusian
- Australorp
- Campine
- Catalana
- Delaware
- Dorking (single comb)
- Dutch
- Holland
- Japanese
- Java
- Jersey Giant
- Lakenvelder
- Lamona
- Leghorn (single comb)
- Minorca (single comb)
- Naked-neck chicken
- Nankin (single comb)
- New Hampshire
- Orpington
- Phoenix
- Plymouth Rock
- Rhode Island Red
- Serama
- Spanish
- Sussex
- Welsummer

=== Rose-comb clean-legged ===
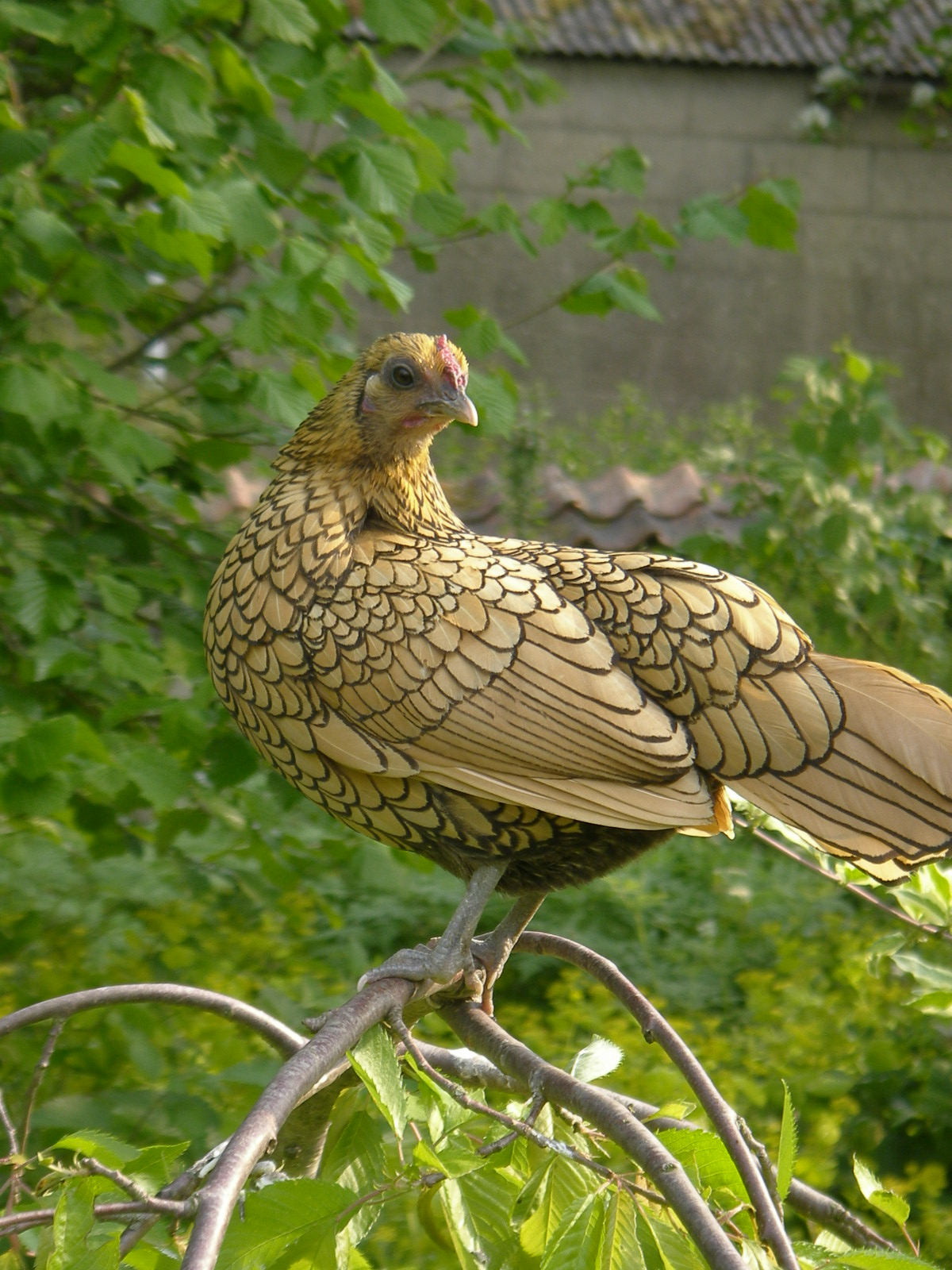
A Citron Sebright hen

This class groups breeds with both a rose comb and featherless legs:

- Ancona (rose comb)
- Bearded d'Anvers
- Dominique
- Dorking (rose comb)
- Hamburg
- Leghorn (rose comb)
- Minorca (rose comb)
- Nankin (rose comb)
- Redcap
- Rhode Island Red
- Rhode Island White
- Rosecomb
- Sebright
- Wyandotte

=== Feather-legged ===
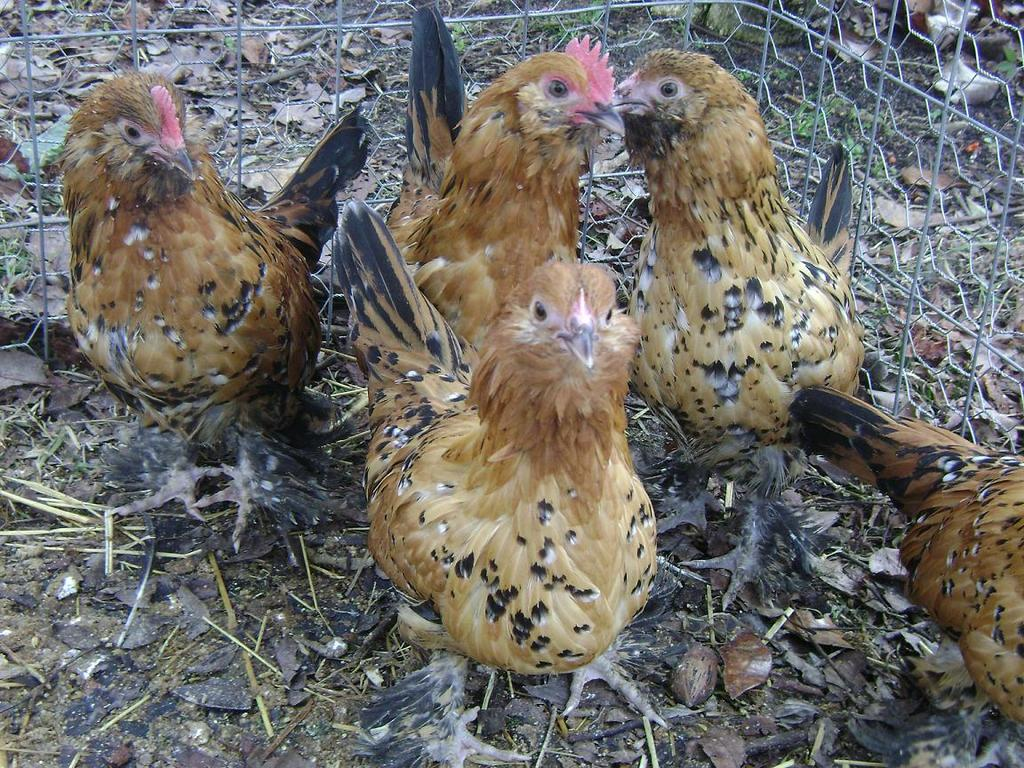
A group of Mille Fleur Belgian Bearded d'Uccle pullets and cockerels

The breeds of this class have feathering on their legs and feet:

- Belgian Bearded d'Uccle
- Booted
- Brahma
- Cochin
- Faverolles
- Langshan (Croad Langshan)
- Silkie
- Sultan

=== All other comb clean-legged ===
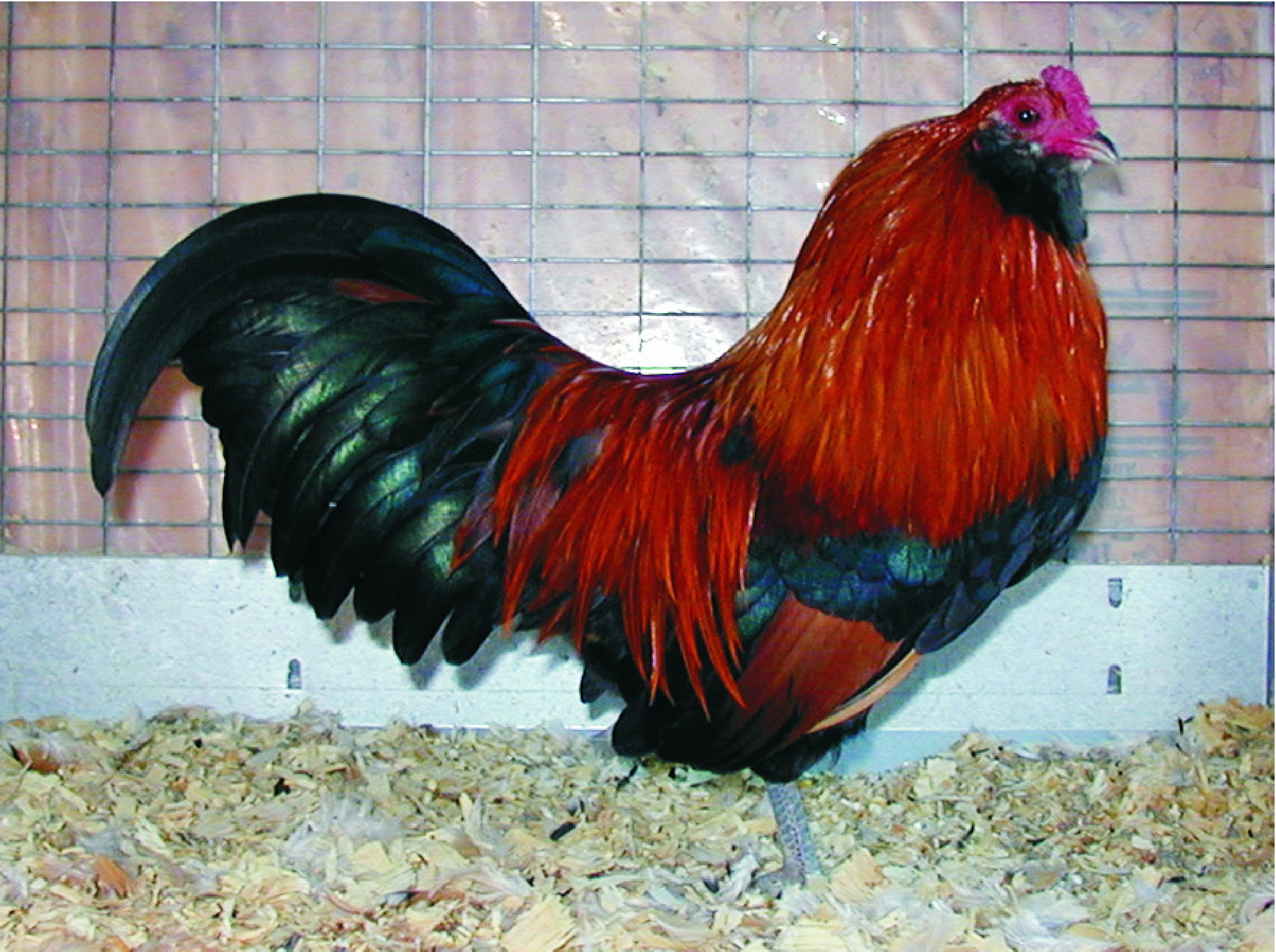
An Ameraucana bantam cock

This class includes all of the breeds that do not fall into any of the other classes:

- Ameraucana
- Araucana
- Buckeye
- Chantecler
- Cornish
- Crevecoeur
- Cubalaya
- Houdan
- La Fleche
- Malay
- Polish
- Shamo
- Sicilian Buttercup
- Sumatra
- Yokohama

== See also ==
- List of North American chicken breeds
