= List of North American chicken breeds =

This is a list of chicken breeds usually considered to originate in Canada and the United States. Some may have complex or obscure histories, so inclusion here does not necessarily imply that a breed is predominantly or exclusively from those countries.

Name	Notes	Male	Female	Chick
Ameraucana				
American Game				
Brahma				
Buckeye			bantam hen	
California Gray				
Chantecler	Canada			
Delaware				
Dominique				
Holland				
Iowa Blue				
Java				
Jersey Giant				
Lamona				
New Hampshire				
Plymouth Rock		buff cock and hens		barred chick
Pyncheon				
Rhode Island Red				
Rhode Island White				
Wyandotte		golden laced cock and hens	silver laced and white hens	silver laced chick
