= Cubalaya =

Breed of chicken

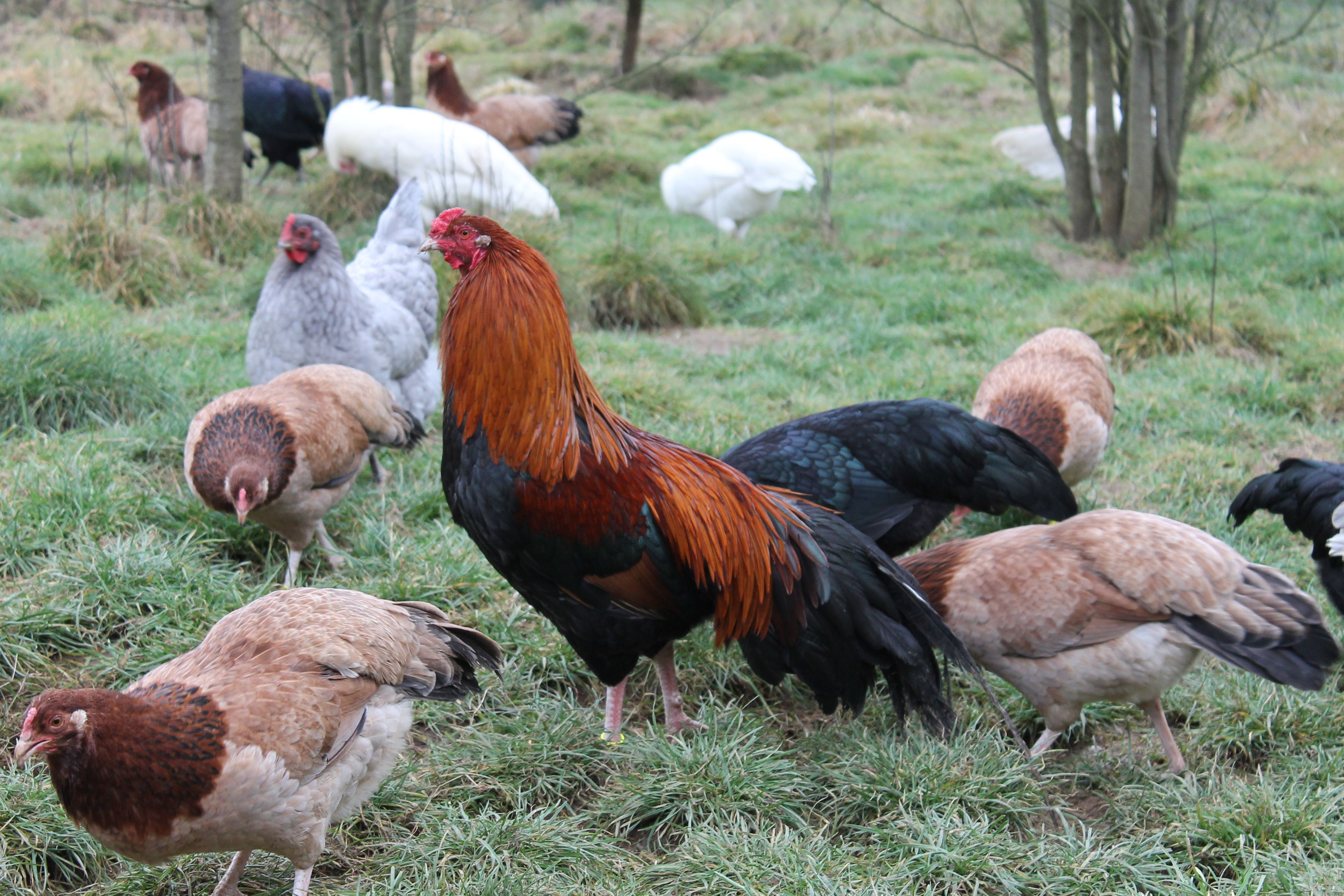
- Country of origin: Cuba
- Use: Triple-purpose: eggs, meat, game

Traits
- Weight: Male: Standard: 2.40 kg Bantam: 740 g; Female: Standard: 1.59 kg Bantam: 625 g
- Comb type: pea

Classification
- APA: all other standard breeds
- ABA: all other comb clean legged
- Chicken; Gallus gallus domesticus

The Cubalaya is a Cuban breed of domestic chicken. It is the only chicken breed with official recognition from the Asociación Nacional de Avicultura, the Cuban national poultry association. It derives from Sumatra and Malay birds brought to Cuba from the Philippines, and was bred as a triple-purpose breed, for meat, eggs and cock-fighting.

== History ==
In the middle 19th century, the Spaniards brought to Havana, Cuba, several varieties of Asiatic game fowl that originated in the Philippine Islands. The Cubans crossed the Asiatic breeds, and subsequently re-crossed them with birds of European origin.

These birds were then selectively bred for wide, extended tails and a curving beak, fierce eyes, and a courageous expression. In this manner the Cubalaya was created, independent from any scientific control. In 1935, the Asociacion Nacional de Avicultura (the Cuban national poultry association) approved the breed. Their name was chosen in honor of the Republic of Cuba, which had patronized and refined them.

The Cubalaya was first shown in the U.S. at the International Poultry Exhibition in 1939, and was recognized by the American Poultry Association in the same year; the bantam is recognized by the American Bantam Association.

== Characteristics ==
Cubalayas are characterized by their stately carriage; pea comb; abundant, flowing hackle feathers and long, well-spread tail carried about 20 degrees below the horizontal. They have a friendly, curious disposition, are very heat tolerant and make excellent foragers when allowed to range. The hens lay small eggs and are good brooders.

The breed has been developed in standard and bantam size. Standard-sized cocks weigh on average 2.40 kg and hens 1.59 kg; bantam cocks weigh about 740 g and hens about 625 g.

Three colors were allowed by the original Cuban standard: black, black-breasted red and white; many others were bred in Cuba at the time. The same three colors are accepted by both the APA and the ABA.
