= Serama =

Breed of chicken

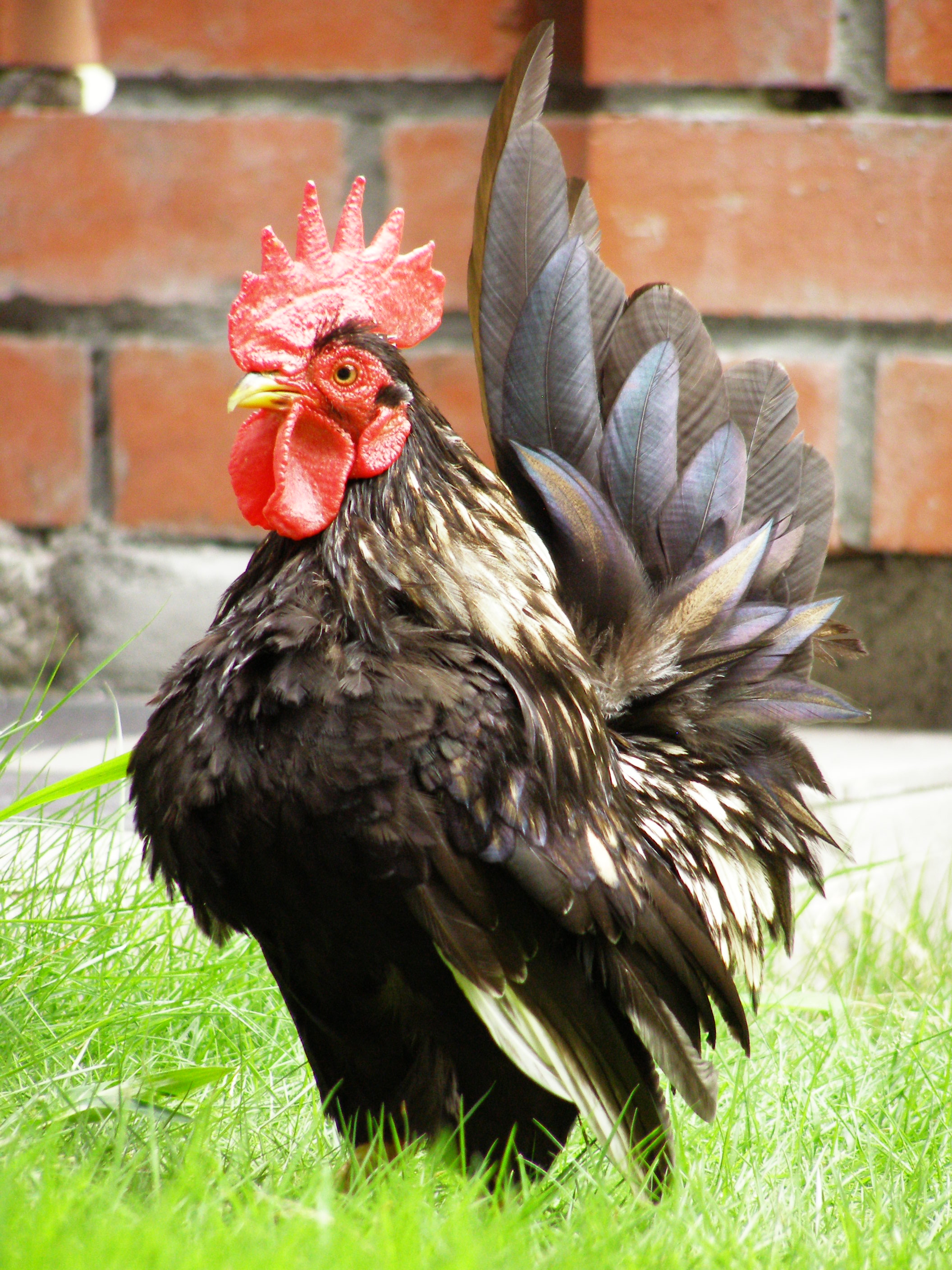
- A Serama rooster in its native country of Malaysia
- Other names: Ayam Serama, Malaysian Serama
- Country of origin: Malaysia

Traits
- Weight: Male: 450g to 500g; Female: 300 to 450g
- Skin color: yellow
- Comb type: single

Classification
- Chicken; Gallus gallus domesticus

The Serama (Malay: Ayam Serama), also called the Malaysian Serama, is a bantam breed of chicken originating in Malaysia within the last 50 years; it is the smallest breed of chicken in the world.

== History ==
Serama originate in the Malaysian state of Kelantan, apparently through the crossing of Japanese and Malaysian bantams. Other stories of the birds derived from a gift of some small chickens by the King of Thailand to a local sultan in ancient times. Small chickens have always been popular pets in this area and are often referred to as "ayam katik" (pygmy chickens) and "ayam cantik" (pretty chickens).

The modern breed is attributed to the efforts of Wee Yean Een from Kelantan, who named the breed "Serama" after Rama, the title of the Kings of Thailand. The breed was first exhibited in 1990. During the 2004 Asian bird flu epidemic, many birds of the breed were culled due to government concerns.

There are no written standards for the breed in its native country. However, they do now have an overall guide on scoring and judging for competitions in Malaysia. Many breeders have a style or type that they breed to, but often breeders keep several "styles". These styles are often names given by breeders to describe a blood line of a champion (e.g. Husin, Mat Awang), but may also be more general shape, characteristics or behaviour (e.g. slim, submarine, and dragon). Hence there is quite a lot of diversity in Malaysia, but an overall theme of a small brave chicken with a persona of fearless warrior or toy soldier. The shape, behaviour, temperament and size of the bird are the most important characteristics. They compete against each other in open table top competitions (often described as "beauty contests") and scored by several judges. The prize for the winning birds can be a considerable sum of money.

=== United States ===
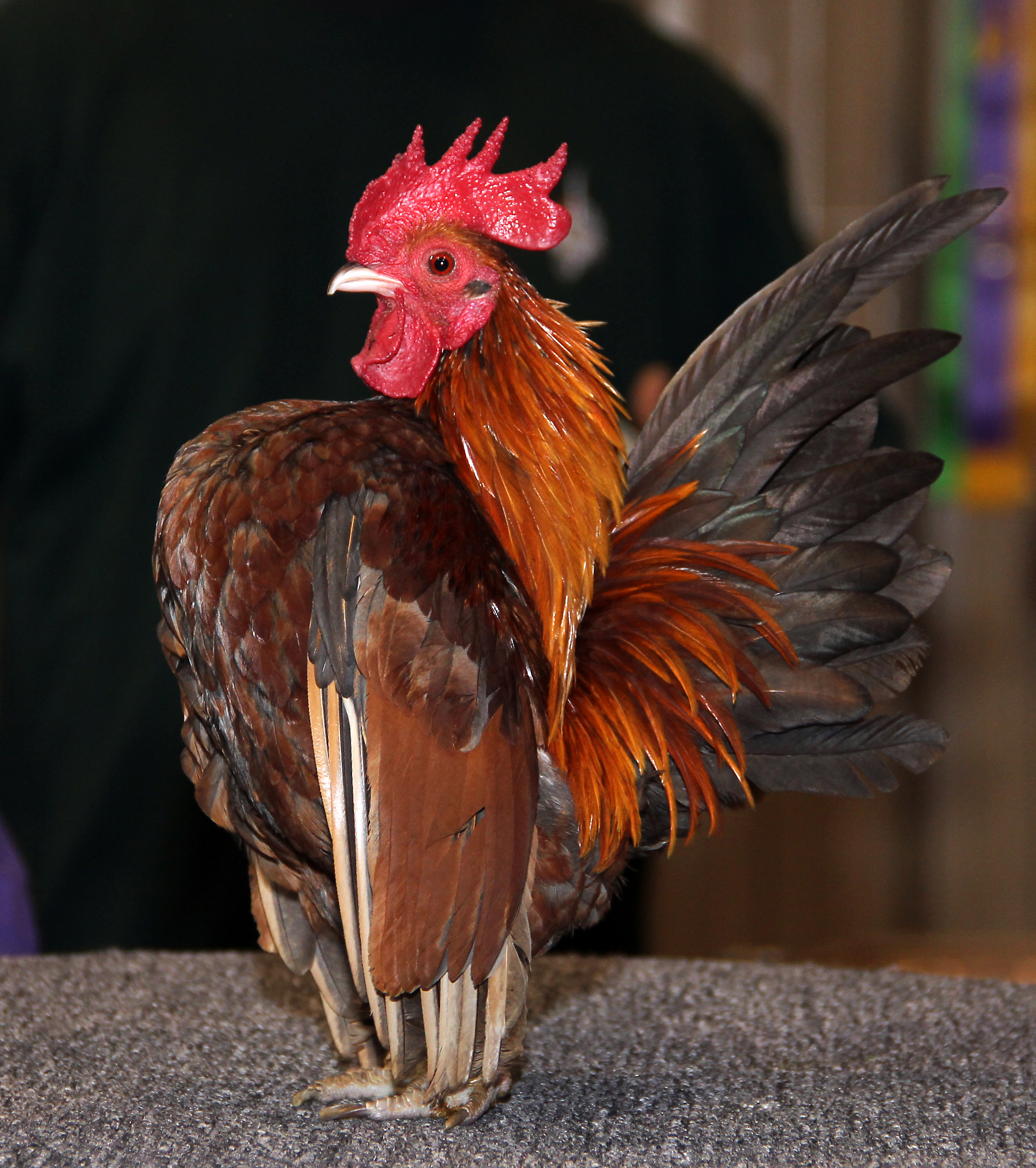
Serama rooster in the United States

The Serama is promoted by several organizations in the US; one such organization is the Serama Council of North America. This council helped to introduce the Serama to North America in various National Poultry shows. In the spring of 2004, a Serama-only show, known as the Cajun Classic, was held in Baton Rouge, Louisiana. The American Serama as put forth by the Serama Council of North America has now gained acceptance by the American Poultry Association and the American Bantam Association as of April 2011, with the White color variety being the first to be accepted.

In early 2012, another group was formed to help gain APA and ABA acceptance of more varieties of serama. This group is known as the American Serama Association.

=== Europe ===
Seramas were initially imported into the UK in 2004. Birds were imported from both America and directly from Malaysia. The foundation Serama flock in the UK consisted of only a few dozen birds. In 2005, a small group of Serama owners and enthusiast decided to form the Serama Club of Great Britain, the first Serama club in the UK. They established the standard for the Serama breed for the UK. Eventually in 2008, the club was officially recognised as the affiliated breed club of the Poultry Club of Great Britain.

Seramas are still relatively rare and expensive in much of mainland Europe. The Netherlands probably has the largest number of Seramas outside the UK. Most of the stock in the Netherlands are descended from birds/eggs imported from America and from the UK.

In France and other European countries they are increasing in popularity. They have four classes of Seramas.

== General characteristics ==
The Serama are characterized by their upright posture, full breast, vertical tail feathers held upright and tight up to the body and vertical wings held down nearly touching the ground. In Malaysia they are described as brave warriors and archangel chickens, because of their very human like appearance.

They are the smallest breed of chicken in the world, standing at 25cm (10 inches) or less; Seramas are typically under 500 g (18 oz), but even smaller birds weighing under 250 g (8.8 oz) have been bred in its native Malaysia. However, size alone does not define a Serama. A small chicken without the Serama "type" is not a Serama, but just another small bantam.

The following describes the overall characteristics of "Malaysian type." The Americans and Europeans have defined variants thereof.

=== Carriage and temperament ===
Seramas have an assertive and confident stance, but are calm and manageable, and should be easily handled and show no aggression. The bird should pose readily and when viewed from the side should create a vase like or wide 'V' shape outline. They shake their wings and pose, walk with pride, pull their head back to reveal a large chest, lift the legs, and in some styles have neck/head vibrations similar to that of a pigeon.

=== Body ===
The body is well muscled with breast carried high, full and well forward. From above the shape is somewhat elliptical, tapering towards the tail. The body should be short.

=== Wings ===
Seramas have fairly large wings in proportion to the body, which should be held in a vertical position just clearing the ground and leaving the feet partially visible. Shoulders should be set high on the bird. Primaries are long of medium width with secondaries moderately long and broad.

=== Tail ===
The tail is full and carried high, pointing upwards and held close to the body of the bird with no space between the body and tail. The sickle feathers are relatively straight and spear like. A minimum of one inch longer than the other tail feathers, but ideally no more than a couple of inches above the head is desirable. The remaining tail feathers should ideally be no higher than the top of the comb when the bird is standing to attention. The main tail feathers should be broad and should over lap neatly. The tail should be open and when viewed from behind should be open to an angle of 45 degrees creating an open 'V' shape.

=== Head ===
The head should be small and carried well back; the head is required beyond the level of the feet and held in position of more than 90 degrees from the feet. The single comb is small to medium in size with a minimum of five serrations preferred. The comb should be straight smooth, free of folds or any deformities and tending towards flyaway type. Wattles are to complement the comb, smaller being preferred and free from folds and wrinkles.

=== Legs and feet ===
The legs are of medium to long length, straight and set wide apart to allow for full and muscular body. They should be strong and stable. Thighs should be of medium length and well muscled with shanks of good thickness. They should not appear soft and weak.

=== Feathers and colour ===
Like some other Asiatic breeds, Seramas are not colour bred in their native country. Only normal feathered birds are accepted in Malaysia. Feathers held tight against the body and should not be long or flowing.

Silkied feathered birds are accepted in America and much of Europe. The silkied gene was believed to be carried by some birds imported from Malaysia.

Other mutations (e.g. frizzled, rumpless and booted) have been introduced in America and some parts of Europe by crossing to other breeds. They can have a range of varieties in colour and structure.

== Breeding ==
Seramas are much like other bantam breeds, and hens can lay up to 4 eggs a week. After laying an egg it takes around 19 days for the chicks to develop and hatch. Chicks are more susceptible to cold temperatures compared to other breeds because of their relative small size. After hatching, it takes about 16–18 weeks for the chicks to mature and reach the point at which they themselves can begin laying eggs.

One U.S. breeder of note was Brian Sparks of Wisconsin, who advocated the Malaysian style of breeding. He was successful in recreating the strong type and small size seen in true Malaysian birds. Word got back to the Serama's native country and top breeders. They took interest in his work and articles about his successes were published by Malaysian news sources.

== Gallery ==
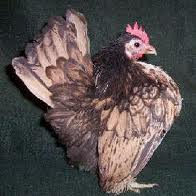

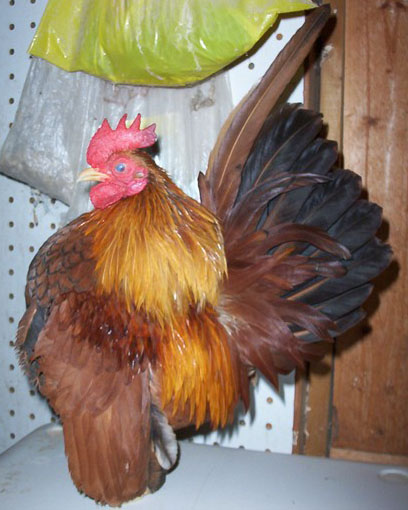

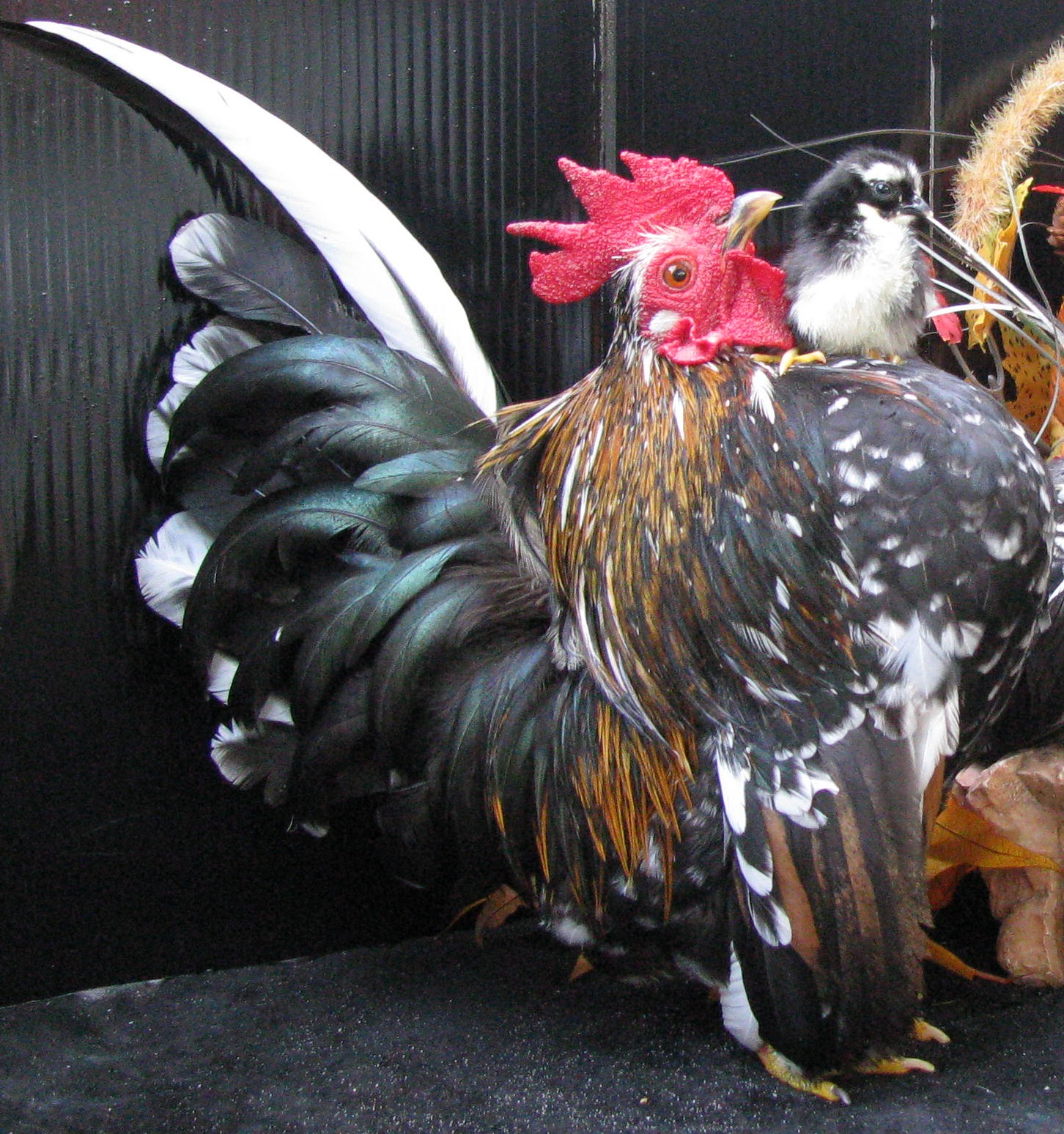

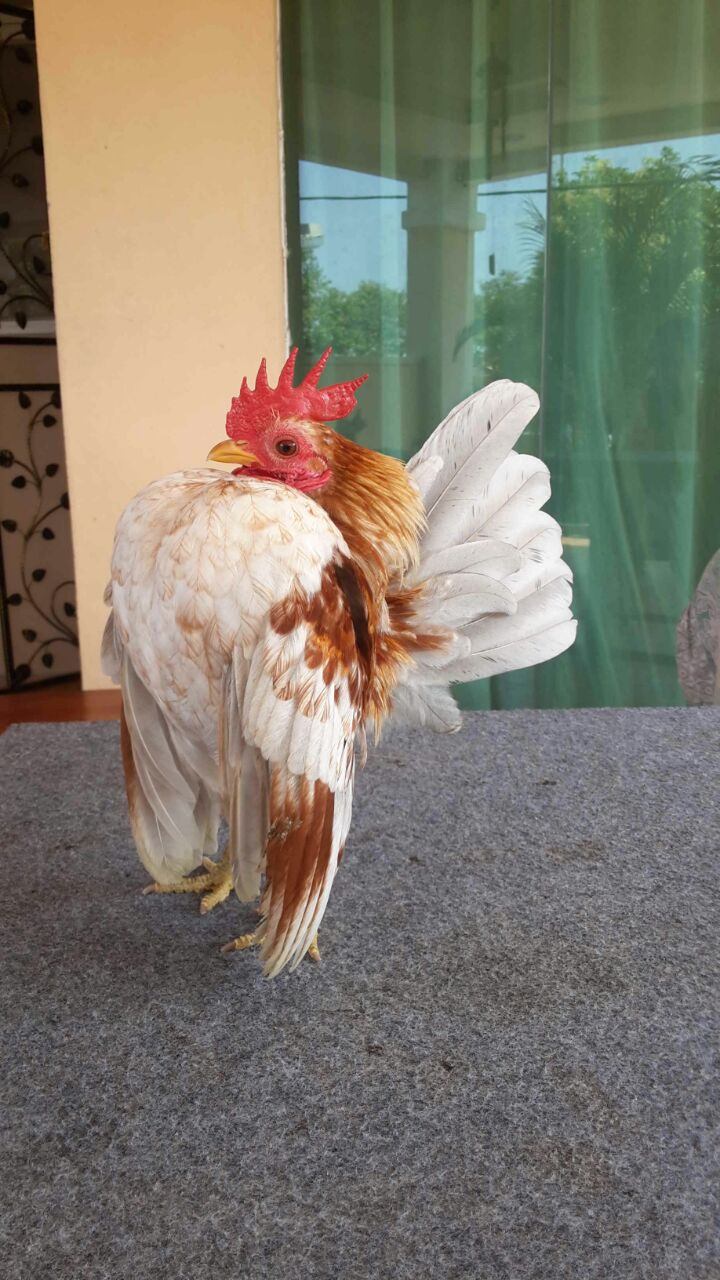

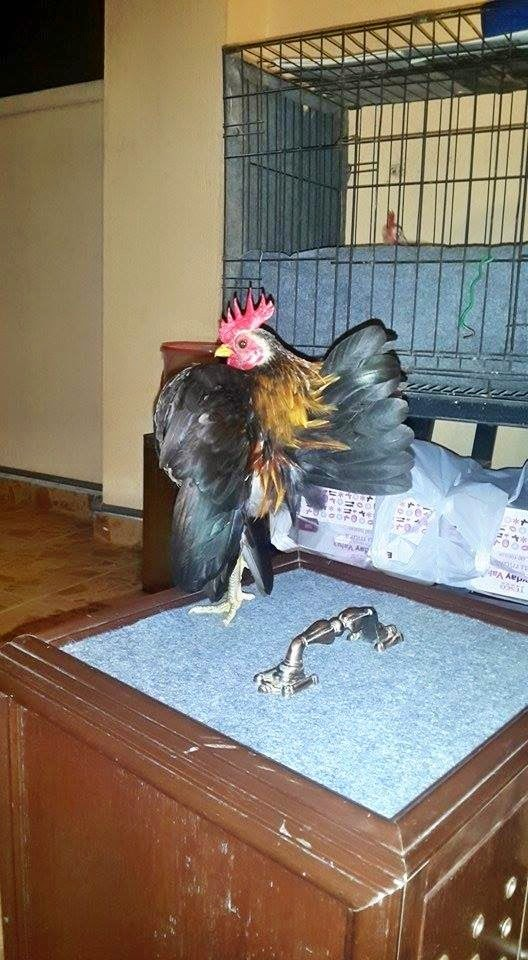

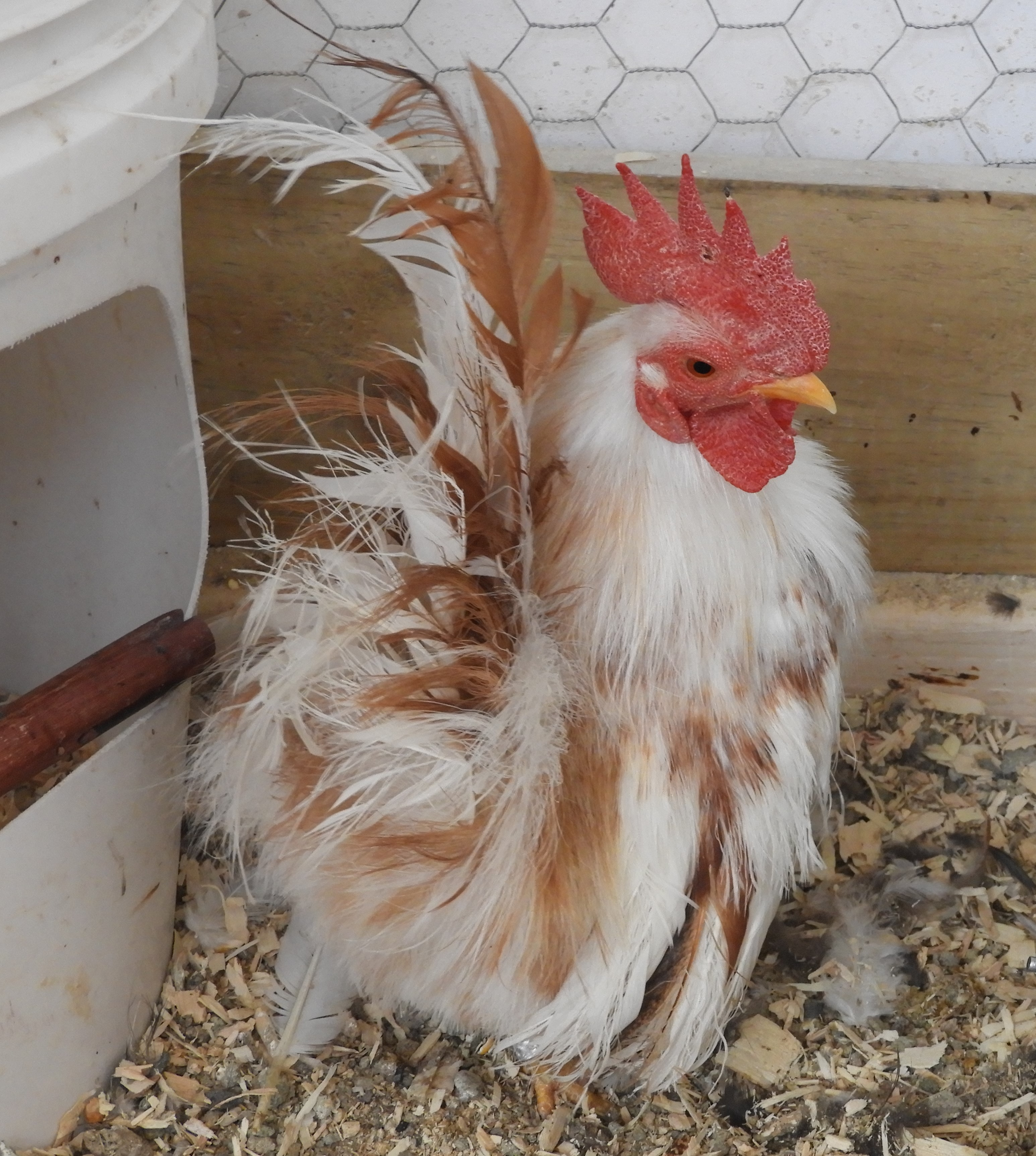
Silkied Serama Rooster
