= Faverolles chicken =

Breed of chicken

Faverolles
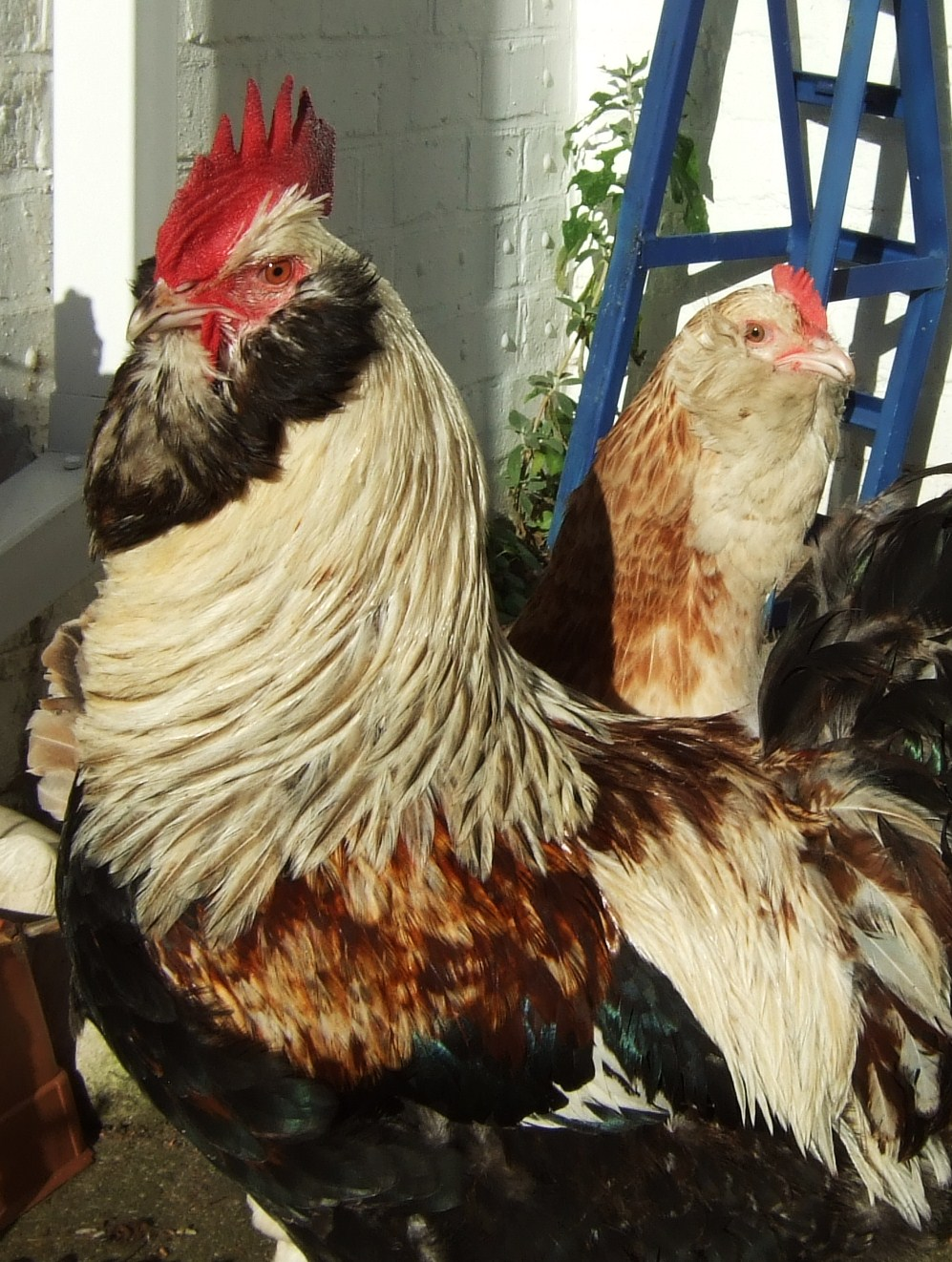
- Salmon Faverolles cock and hen
- Country of origin: France
- Use: eggs, meat, show

Traits
- Weight: Male: 5.0 kg; Female: 4.3 kg
- Egg color: light brown to pinkish

Classification
- APA: continental
- ABA: feather legged
- PCGB: soft feather: heavy
- Chicken; Gallus gallus domesticus

The Faverolles (French pronunciation: [favʁɔl]) is a French breed of chicken. The breed was developed in the 1860s in north-central France, in the vicinity of the villages of Houdan and Faverolles. The breed was given the name of the latter village and the singular is thus also Faverolles, not Faverolle. The final "s" is silent in French.

Faverolles were originally bred in France as a utility fowl, used for both eggs and meat but are now primarily raised for exhibition.

When Faverolles reached the UK in 1886, the breed was further altered to meet exhibition standards, British breeders developed a type of Faverolles with longer, higher raised tail feathers than their German and French cousins.

== Characteristics ==
Faverolles are classified as a heavy breed and have a beard, muffs, feathered feet and five toes per foot, rather than the usual four. Faverolles are well adapted both to confinement and free range. When battery cages began to be used at the very beginning of the twentieth century, Faverolles tolerated the close confinement better than the Houdan breed. Thus, the Faverolles was the primary breed which produced eggs for the Paris market during the early part of the century. Although primarily kept today as an ornamental and exhibition breed, it remains an excellent layer, as well as a fine meat chicken. The most common color is Salmon. The plumage of salmon females is mainly brown and creamy white. The males are darker, with black, brown, and straw-colored feathers.

Other varieties, including white, black, ermine, cuckoo, mahogany, splash and blue also exist. Hens are good winter layers of medium-sized, light brown to pinkish eggs. Some cocks are the quietest of all breeds and Faverolles are also known for their extreme docility. As a result, they tend to get bullied in a mixed flock for being so gentle and friendly. They thrive in groups with other Faverolles, or perhaps, with other docile breeds such as the Sussex.

Because of their gentleness Faverolles have become a popular breed of chicken to keep as a pet, especially for children. They are also enjoying increasing popularity with people who keep small home flocks, who favor dual purpose breeds which are well suited to both egg production and use as meat. Faverolles are considered to be very good layers, a well-cared for Faverolles hen will lay approximately four eggs per week.

According to the standards of the Poultry Club of Great Britain, British Faverolles cocks weigh 4.08–4.98 kg (9–11 lb), cockerels 3.4–4.53 kg (7.5–10.0 lb), hens 3.4–4.3 kg (7.5–9.5 lb) and pullets 3.17–4.08 kg (7–9 lb); bantam cocks weigh 1130–1360 g and hens 907-1133 g. The Australian and United States standards call for a slightly smaller bird, but still a relatively large chicken. The Australian standard specifies that cocks weight from eight to ten pounds, hens six and a half to eight and a half pounds. The American Poultry Association standard for cocks is 8 lb (4 kg) and for hens is 6 lb (3 kg). In comparison, the French masse idéale for a cock is 3.5–4.0 kg (8–9 lb) and for a hen is 2.8–3.5 kg (6–8 lb).
