= Delaware chicken =

American breed of chicken

Delaware
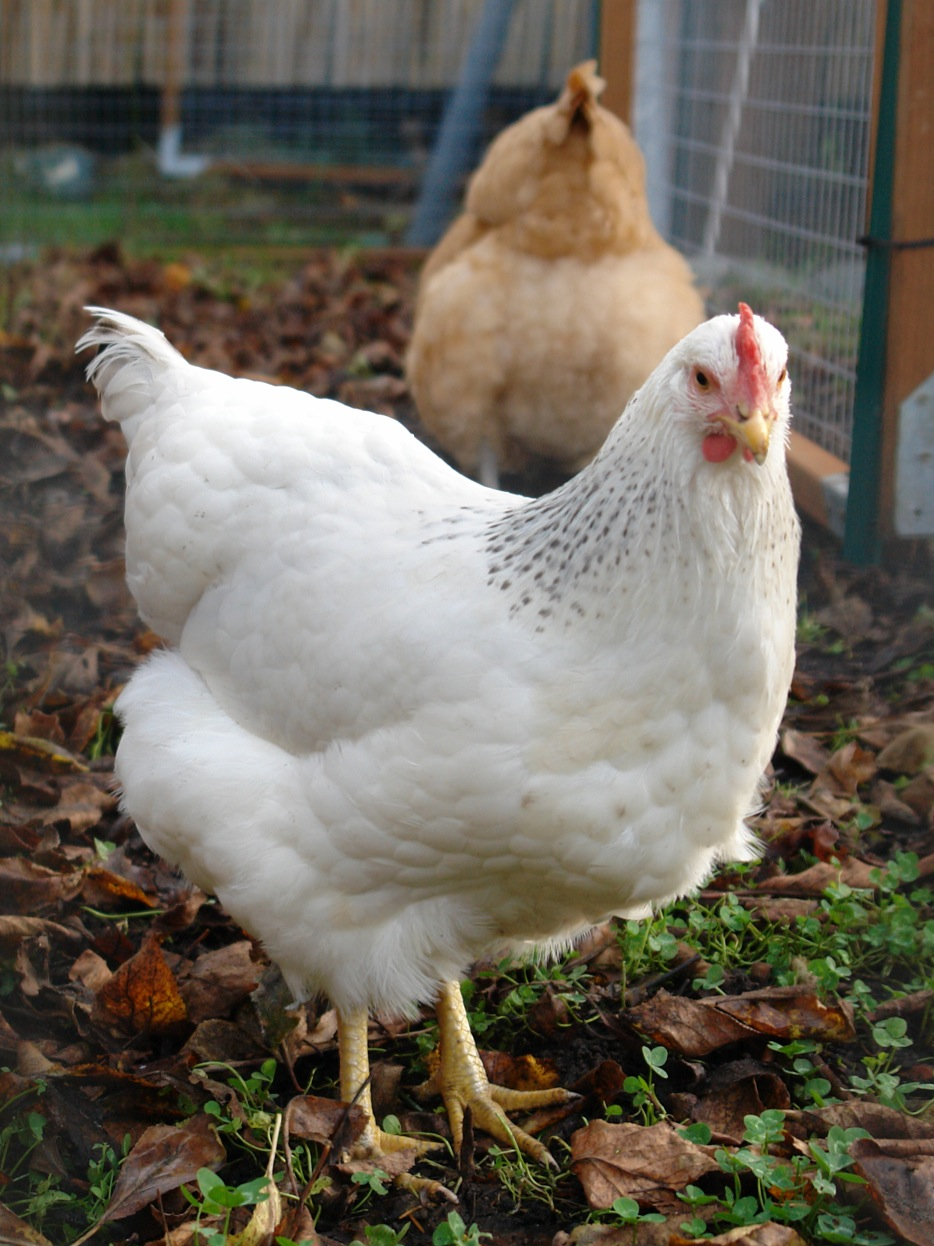
- A pullet
- Conservation status: FAO (2007): endangered; DAD-IS (2024): Livestock Conservancy (2024): recovering

Traits
- Weight: Male: Large fowl: 3.5 kg (8 lb); Bantam: 975 g (34 oz); Female: Large fowl: 2.8 kg (6 lb); Bantam: 850 g (30 oz)
- Skin color: yellow
- Egg color: brown
- Color: barred Colombian

Classification
- APA: American
- ABA: single comb, clean-legged
- EE: no
- PCGB: no

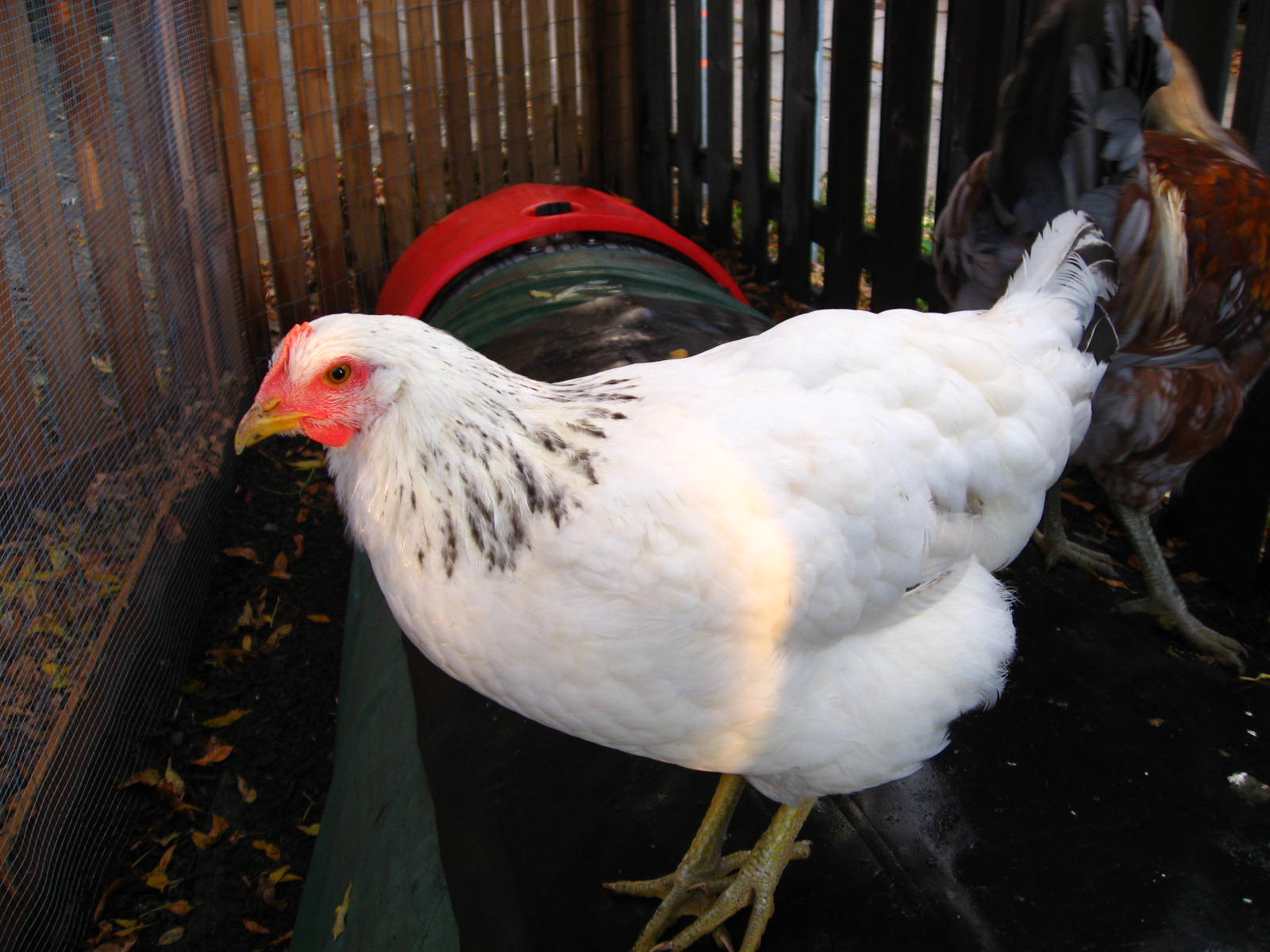
A hen

The Delaware is an American breed of chicken with an unusual plumage pattern. It was developed in the state of Delaware in the mid-twentieth century, and was initially known as the Indian River. It was briefly of some importance in the American chicken industry, until it was superseded by the common industrial Cornish Rock cross.

In the twenty-first century it is an endangered breed. It may be kept for meat, for eggs or for showing.

== History ==
In the early twentieth century, the cross of a Barred Plymouth Rock rooster on a New Hampshire hen was a common choice for producing broilers. Occasionally, this mating produces sports with light coloration. George Ellis of Delaware selectively bred these light-colored birds, which led to the creation of the breed in 1940. He first chose to call them Indian Rivers, but later the name was switched to match its state of origin. At the time, the Delmarva Peninsula, where the breed was created, supplied chicken to the entirety of the East Coast of the United States through companies such as Perdue Farms. The Delaware rapidly became the principal broiler fowl in use in the region, thus affecting the industry at large. It was added to the Standard of Perfection of the American Poultry Association in 1952; the bantam version was added in 1960.

Beginning in the mid-1950s, commercial farms began to use the White Cornish-Rock cross that would come to dominate the chicken industry into the next century. The speedy adoption of the Cornish-Rock saw the decline of the Delaware, though it persisted in some areas into the 1960s.

In the twenty-first century it is an endangered breed. In 2010 its conservation status was listed by the American Livestock Breeds Conservancy (later called the Livestock Conservancy) as 'critical', its highest level of concern. In 2013 it was listed as 'threatened', the second level; by 2021 it had been moved to the third level, 'watch', and in 2024 was listed as 'recovering'. A breed census in 2015 found a total population of 4692 birds. The Delaware is included in the Ark of Taste of the international Slow Food Foundation. It is reported only from the United States, and is not recognized by the Entente Européenne or the Poultry Club of Great Britain.

== Characteristics ==
The Delaware is of medium size; average weight for cock birds is approximately 3.5 kg, and some 2.8 kg for hens. There is only one plumage variety, sometimes called 'barred Columbian': it resembles the Columbian pattern, but the primaries, secondaries, hackles and tail feathers are barred rather than solid black. The comb is single and five-pointed; it, the wattles and the earlobes are all bright red. The beak is a reddish horn color, the eyes a reddish bay, and the shanks and feet yellow.

== Use ==
Also of note is that all feathers have a white quill and shaft, which, combined with yellow skin, makes for a cleaner appearing carcass. Like most standard breeds of chicken, the Delaware has a miniaturized bantam version; however, these are rarely seen.

Delawares are hardy birds that mature quickly. Hens are good layers of large to jumbo brown eggs and will go broody. Unlike the most common commercial meat birds in use today, the Delaware does well in free range operations. In temperament, it is a calm, but not a typically friendly bird although in some cases can be.
