= Sumatra chicken =

Breed of chicken

Sumatra
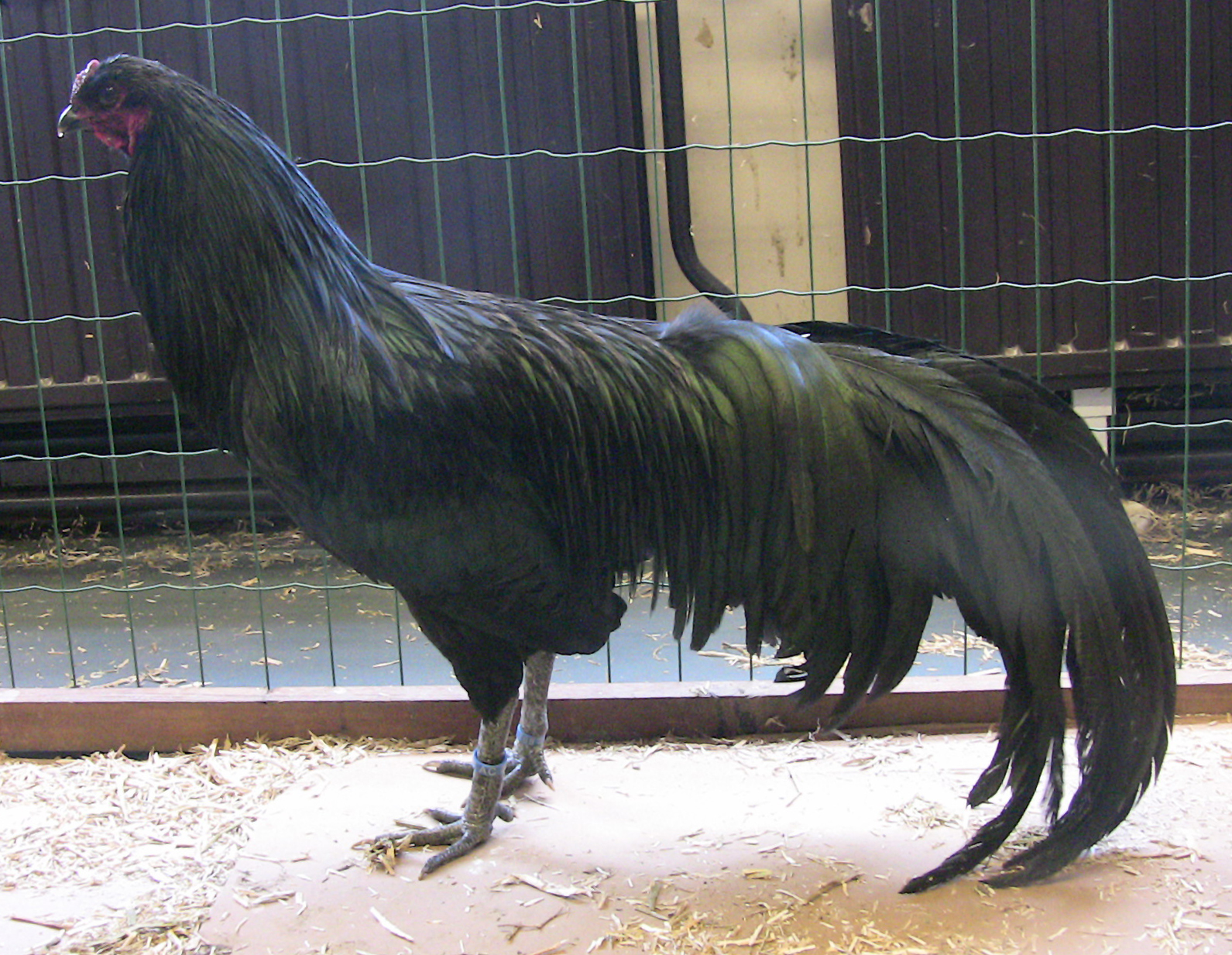
- Conservation status: FAO (2007): endangered; DAD-IS (2024): at risk
- Other names: Black Sumatra; Sumatra Game
- Country of origin: Indonesia
- Distribution: Europe; North America
- Use: ornament; showing; hatching eggs

Traits
- Weight: Male: Standard: 2.25–2.70 kg; Bantam: 735 g; Female: Standard: 1.80 kg; Bantam: 625 g
- Egg color: white
- Comb type: pea

Classification
- APA: all other standard breeds
- ABA: all other combs, clean legged
- EE: yes
- PCGB: rare soft feather: light
- Chicken; Gallus gallus domesticus

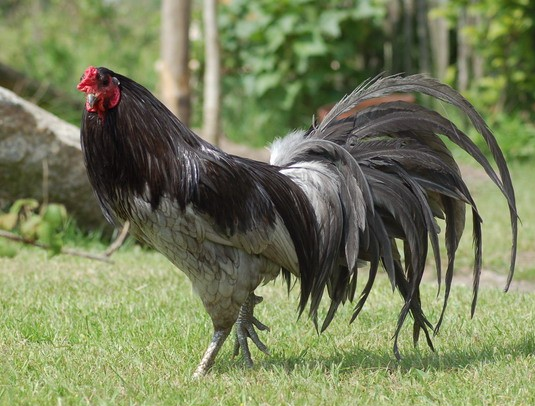
Blue cock

The Sumatra is a European and North American breed of chicken. It derives from birds imported in the nineteenth century from the island of Sumatra in Indonesia as fighting cocks.

== History ==
The Sumatra derives from birds brought in 1847 from the island of Sumatra in Indonesia to the United States for use as fighting cocks. It was recognised in the United States in 1883 and in the United Kingdom in 1906. Birds were imported to Germany from the United States in 1882.

== Characteristics ==
The original colour of the Sumatra was the black – often with a rich beetle-green sheen – which was added to the American Standard of Perfection in 1883, and was standardised in Britain in 1906. The blue is the only other colour recognised by the American Poultry Association; it was added in 2003. The Poultry Club of Great Britain recognises black, blue and white, while the Entente Européenne recognises the black, black-red and wild type but not the blue.

Cocks weigh 2.25–2.70 kg, and hens about 1.80 kg. The comb is pea-shaped and as small as possible. The beak, face, earlobes, throat, comb, shanks and feet are as dark as possible, preferably black.

The Sumatra retains a strong flying ability, unlike most modern chicken breeds.

== Use ==
The Sumatra may be reared as an ornamental breed or for showing. Hens are good layers of white or cream-coloured eggs, of which they may lay about 130 per year. They are good sitters, and may be used to hatch eggs of other breeds, including water-fowl.
