= American Game =

American breed of fighting chicken

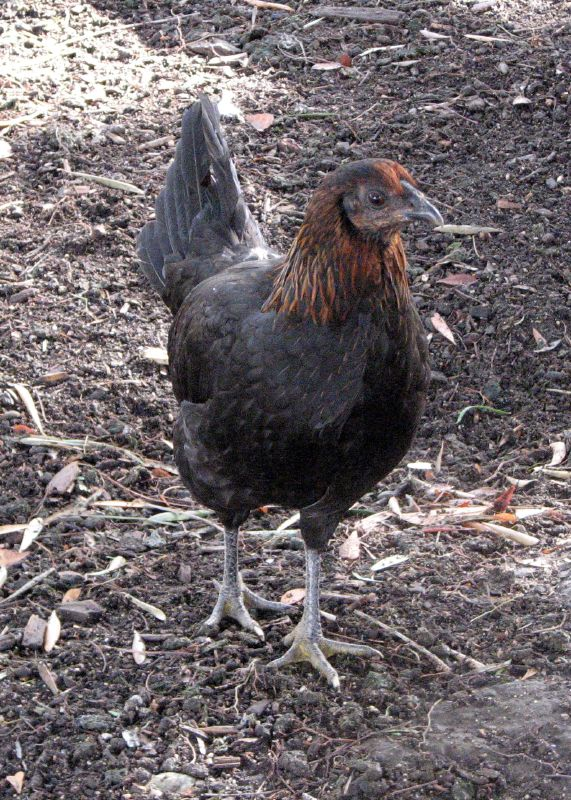
- Bantam hen
- Conservation status: FAO (2007): not listed; Livestock Conservancy (2020): study; Livestock Conservancy (2021): not listed
- Country of origin: United States
- Use: cockfighting; ornament; meat

Traits
- Weight: Male: bantam: 850 g; Female: bantam: 765 g
- Egg color: brown
- Comb type: single

Classification
- APA: Large fowl: no; Bantam: game bantam
- ABA: Bantam: yes
- EE: no
- PCGB: no

The American Game is an American breed of game fowl, chickens bred specifically for cockfighting. It has many color varieties, and may also be kept for ornament.

== History ==
The American Game was bred for cockfighting. The full-size ("large fowl") American Game is not recognized by the American Poultry Association, which in 2009 recognized the American Game Bantam in ten colors. The American Game is not among the fifty-three chicken breeds reported by the National Animal Germplasm Program of the USDA Agricultural Research Service to the DAD-IS database of the FAO, nor is it recognized by the Entente Européenne d'Aviculture et de Cuniculture or by the Poultry Club of Great Britain. In 2020 its conservation status was listed by the Livestock Conservancy as "study"; in 2021 it was no longer listed.

Some stock has been exported to the United Kingdom; in 2002 there were fewer than a hundred birds there.

=== American Game Bantam ===
The bantam version of the breed does not derive from the original large fowl. It was created in New Jersey in the 1940s by a breeder named Frank Gary. He cross-bred the wild red jungle fowl with fighting bantams of the type known at the time as "pit game". The American Game Bantam was listed in the yearbook of the American Bantam Association from 1950, and was admitted to the Standard of Perfection of the American Poultry Association in 2009.

== Characteristics ==
The standard-sized American Game is bred in a wide range of plumage colors; cock birds have long sickle feathers.

The bantam has a small five-pointed single comb and small smooth wattles and earlobes. Ten color varieties are recognized by the APA: birchen; black; black-breasted red; blue; blue red; brown red; golden duckwing; red pyle; silver duckwing; and white. Two others, "brassy back" and wheaten, are also raised.

== Use ==
The American Game was bred for cockfighting. It is a good table bird, and may be kept for ornament. Hens lay brown eggs of medium to large size. As with other fighting breeds, for exhibition the comb, earlobes and wattles are cut off ("dubbed").
