= Holland chicken =

Breed of chicken

Hollands are a fairly rare breed of large chickens that are dual purpose and originate from America. They are hard to tell from Plymouth rocks and Dominiques, but can be recognized as the Plymouth Rock has colored feet and the Dominique has a rose comb.

== History ==
The breed was developed at the Rutgers Breeding Farms in New Jersey, with birds imported from Holland being crossed with White Leghorns, Rhode Island Reds, New Hampshires, and Lamonas, which created the White Hollands. Another cross that included White Leghorns, Barred Plymouth Rocks, Australorps and Brown Leghorns produced the barred variety of Hollands. Both were accepted by the American Poultry Association in 1949.

== General information ==
- Class: American
- Varieties: White and Barred
- Purpose: Dual (egg and meat)
- Egg Size / Color: Medium / White
- Skin Color: Yellow
- Standard Weights: Cock - 8½lbs; Hen - 6½lbs; Cockerel - 7½lbs; Pullet - 5½lbs

There is also a bantam version of the breed.

=== Approximate weight ===
Cock	3.9 kg	8.75 lbs
Hen	3 kg	6½ lbs
Cockerel	3.4 kg	7½ lbs
Pullet	2.5 kg	5½ lbs
