= Ancona chicken =

Italian breed of chicken

Ancona
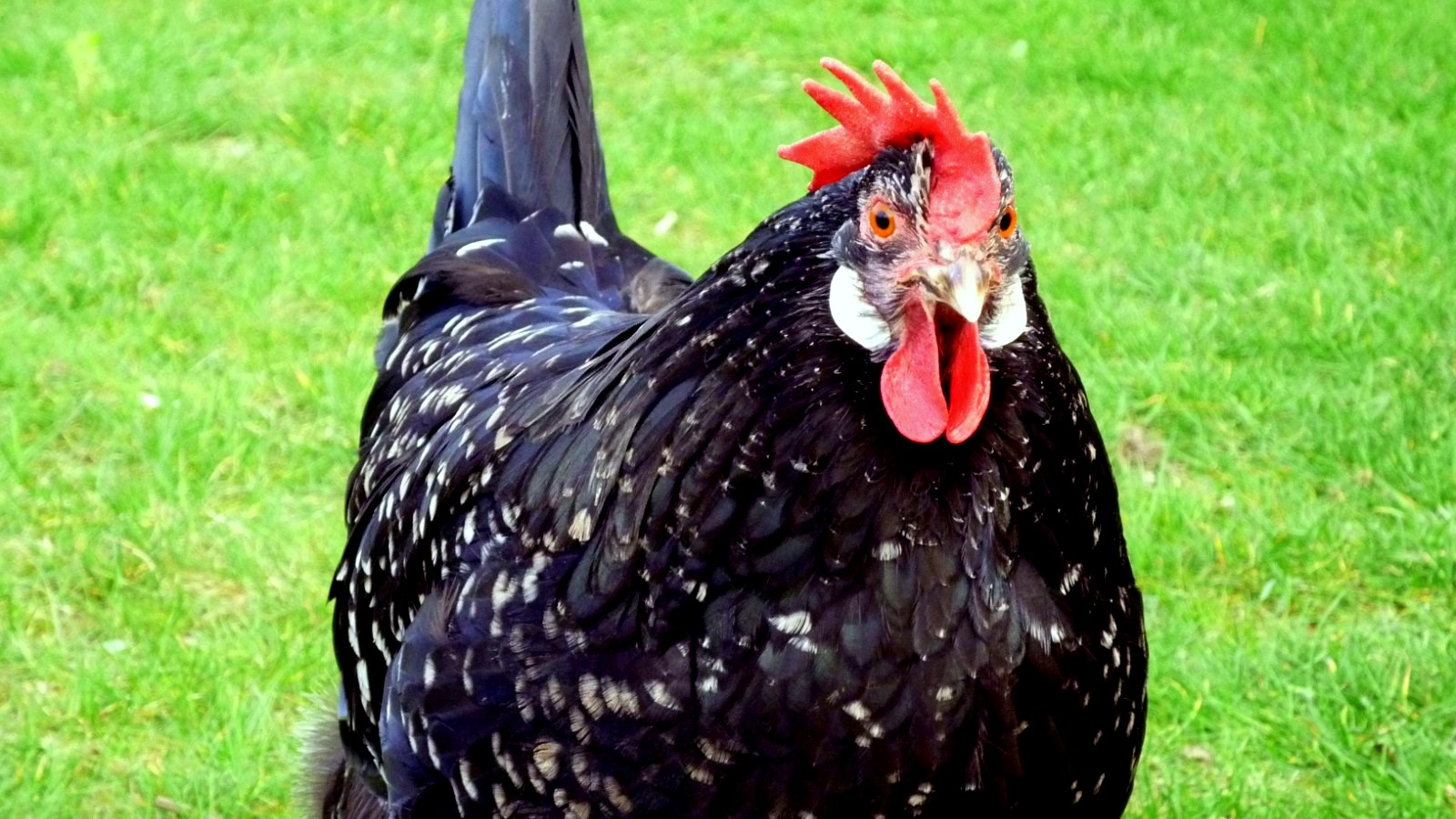
- Country of origin: Italy; United Kingdom
- Use: eggs

Traits
- Weight: Male: 2.5–2.8 kg (5.5–6 lb); Female: 1.8–2.1 kg (4–4.5 lb)
- Skin colour: yellow
- Egg colour: white
- Comb type: single or rose

Classification
- APA: Mediterranean
- EE: no
- PCGB: soft feather: light
- Chicken; Gallus gallus domesticus

The Ancona is an Italian breed of chicken. It is named after the city and province of Ancona, in the Marche region of Italy, but was bred to its present type mainly in the United Kingdom in the nineteenth century.

In 2025 its conservation status world-wide was "at risk", with few more than 800 birds reported – most of them in Australia. In Italy numbers are very low; an initiative to re-establish the breed in its native area and to preserve its biodiversity was launched in 2000. There is also an Ancona bantam.

== History ==
The Ancona originated in central Italy, where it was the breed of chicken with the widest distribution. Some birds were exported in 1851 to England, where they were selectively bred for regularity and consistency of the white markings in the plumage. In 1880 a breeder named Cobb showed a group. Some were exported from Britain to the United States in 1888. Rose-combed Ancona chickens were first shown in Birmingham, in the West Midlands, in 1910.

The single-combed Ancona was recognised by the American Poultry Association in 1898, and the rose-combed variant in 1914.

== Characteristics ==
The Ancona is a typical Mediterranean chicken, rustic, lively and hardy. Birds range widely and take flight easily.

The plumage is black, mottled with white. Approximately one feather in three has a v-shaped white marking at the tip. All primaries, sickles and tail-feathers should have white tips. The black feathers may have a beetle-green tint. In Italy, blue mottled with white is also recognised in full-size birds, but not in bantams. In Australia a red variety is recognised, with a chestnut to red bay ground colour.

The legs are yellow mottled with black, the beak yellow with some black markings on the upper mandible, and the eye orange-red. The skin is yellow, the ear-lobes white or cream-coloured. The comb is of medium size, with five well-marked points; in hens it should fall gracefully to one side. In the United Kingdom and in the United States, but not in Italy, a rose comb is permitted.

Cocks weigh 2.5 to 2.8 kg and hens 1.8 to 2.1 kg; ring sizes are 18 mm and 16 mm respectively for full-sized birds, and 13 mm and 11 mm for bantams.

== Use ==
The Ancona is a good layer of white eggs, of which it lays an average of 220 per year; the eggs weigh 50 g (2 oz) or more. Hens have little tendency to broodiness; pullets may begin to lay at five months old.
