= Rosecomb =

Breed of chicken

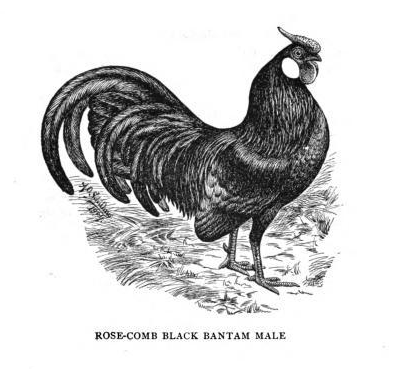
- Illustration of the ideal Black Rosecomb male in the American Standard of Perfection, 1905
- Conservation status: at risk
- Country of origin: United Kingdom
- Standard: Rosecomb Bantam Federation (USA)

Traits
- Weight: Male: 620 grams; Female: 510 grams
- Comb type: Rose

Classification
- APA: Rose comb clean legged
- PCGB: True bantam
- Chicken; Gallus gallus domesticus

The Rosecomb is a breed of chicken named for its distinctive comb. Rosecombs are bantam chickens, and are among those known as true bantams, meaning they are not a miniaturised version of a large fowl. Rosecombs are one of the oldest and most popular bantam breeds in showing, and thus have numerous variations within the breed. An ornamental chicken, they are poor egg layers and not suited for meat production.

== History ==
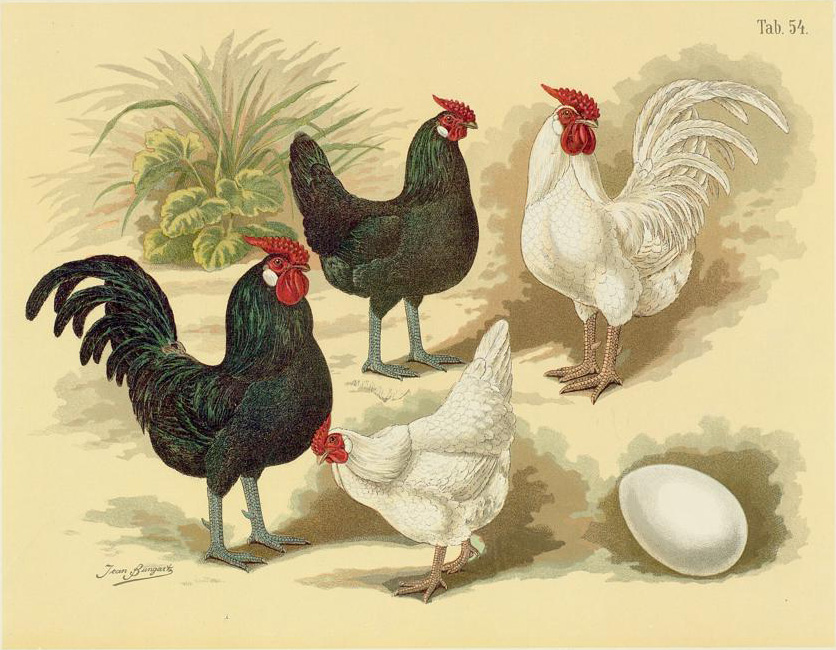
Illustration of black pair and white pair

The Rosecomb is one of the oldest bantam breeds of chicken. The earliest surviving records of the breed are from the 14th century in Britain, though it may have another point of origin. Their popularity as an ornamental breed first took flight after King Richard III began to raise them. Their popularity among poultry enthusiasts continued in to the 19th century, and Rosecombs were shown at the first North American poultry exhibition in 1849, as well as being admitted in to the first edition of American Standard of Perfection in 1874. Today their widespread keeping by breeders persists.

== Characteristics ==
Rosecombs are almost exclusively kept for competitive poultry showing, and their characteristics reflect this. Males generally weigh 570–620 g (20–22 oz) and females 450–510 g (16–18 oz). The breed's eponymous trait is its rose comb, which is large compared to its overall body size. They also sport relatively substantial white earlobes, prodigious tails, and a compact body shape. In addition to these general characteristics, Rosecombs appear in 25 different colour variations, though black, blue, and white are the most common.

Selective breeding solely for appearance has produced birds with striking appearances, but poor egg laying ability, carcasses unsuitable for eating, and some reproductive problems. Due to a genetic trait tied to rose combed chickens, roosters may have low fertility. Hens rarely are inclined to brood their own clutches, and chicks have high mortality rates. However, adult birds are generally hardy and active. Unlike the majority of chickens, Rosecombs are good fliers. They are also usually friendly birds, but cocks may be aggressive.

== Gallery ==
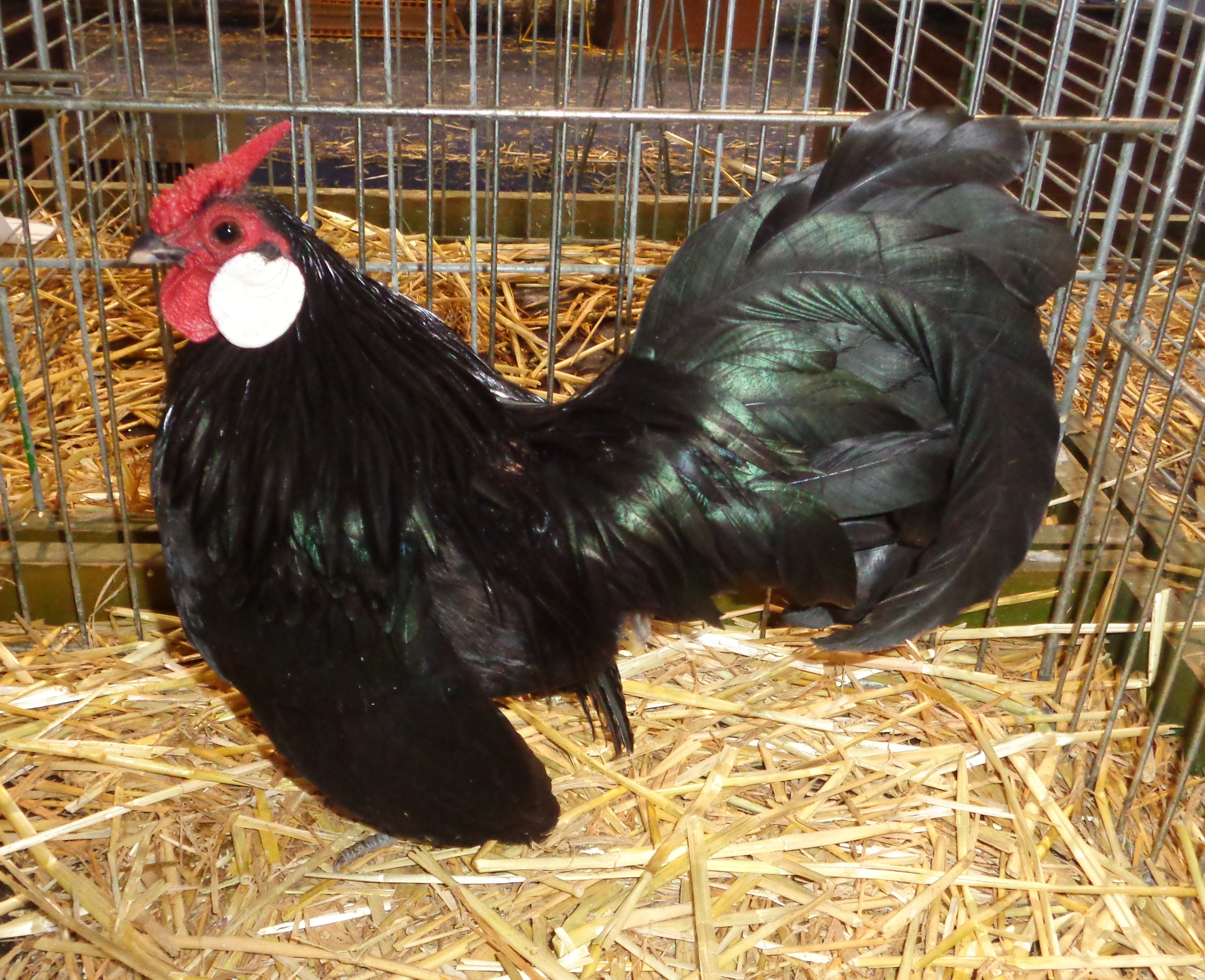
Black male

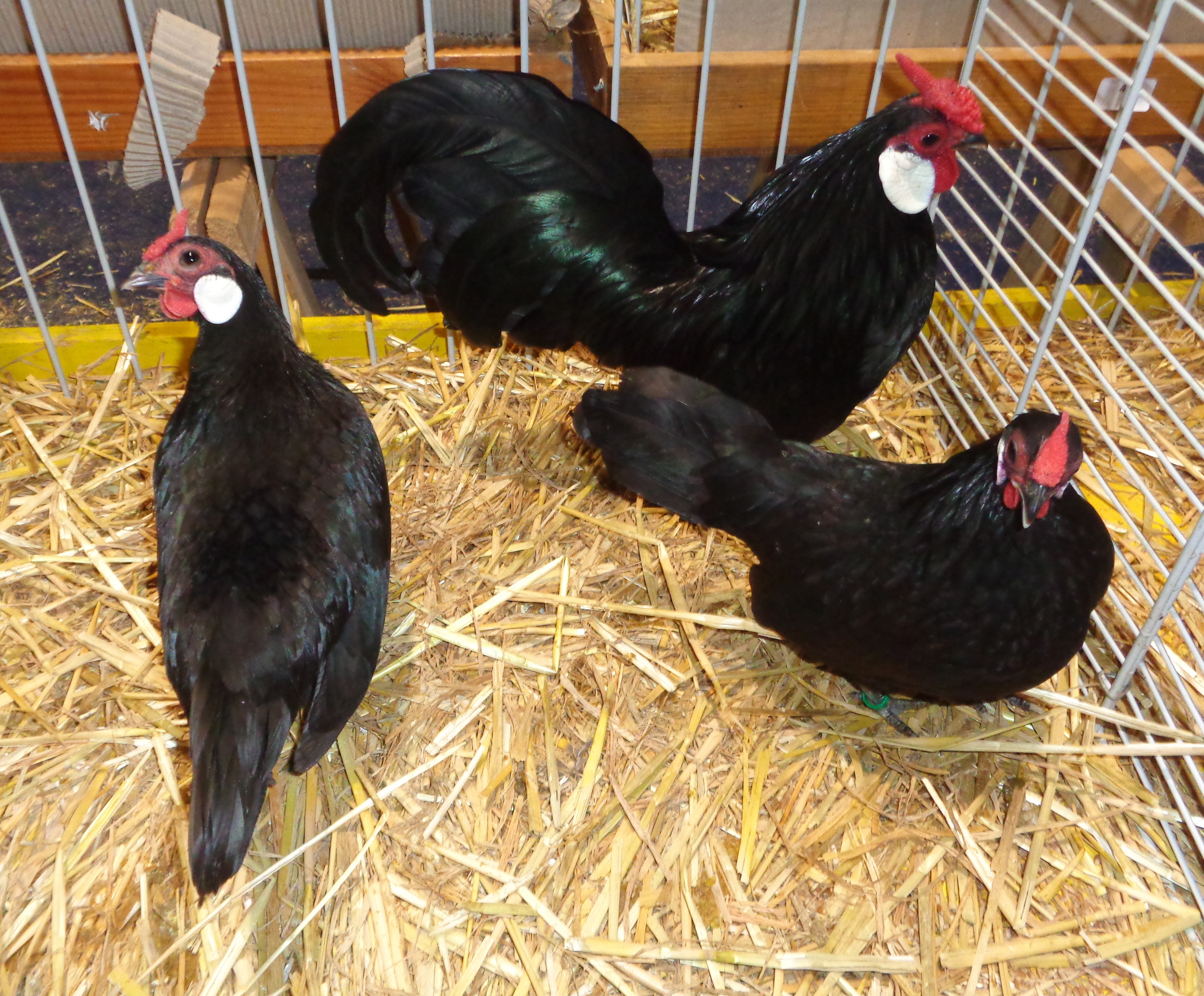
A trio of Black rosecomb bantams
