= Jersey Giant =

American breed of chicken

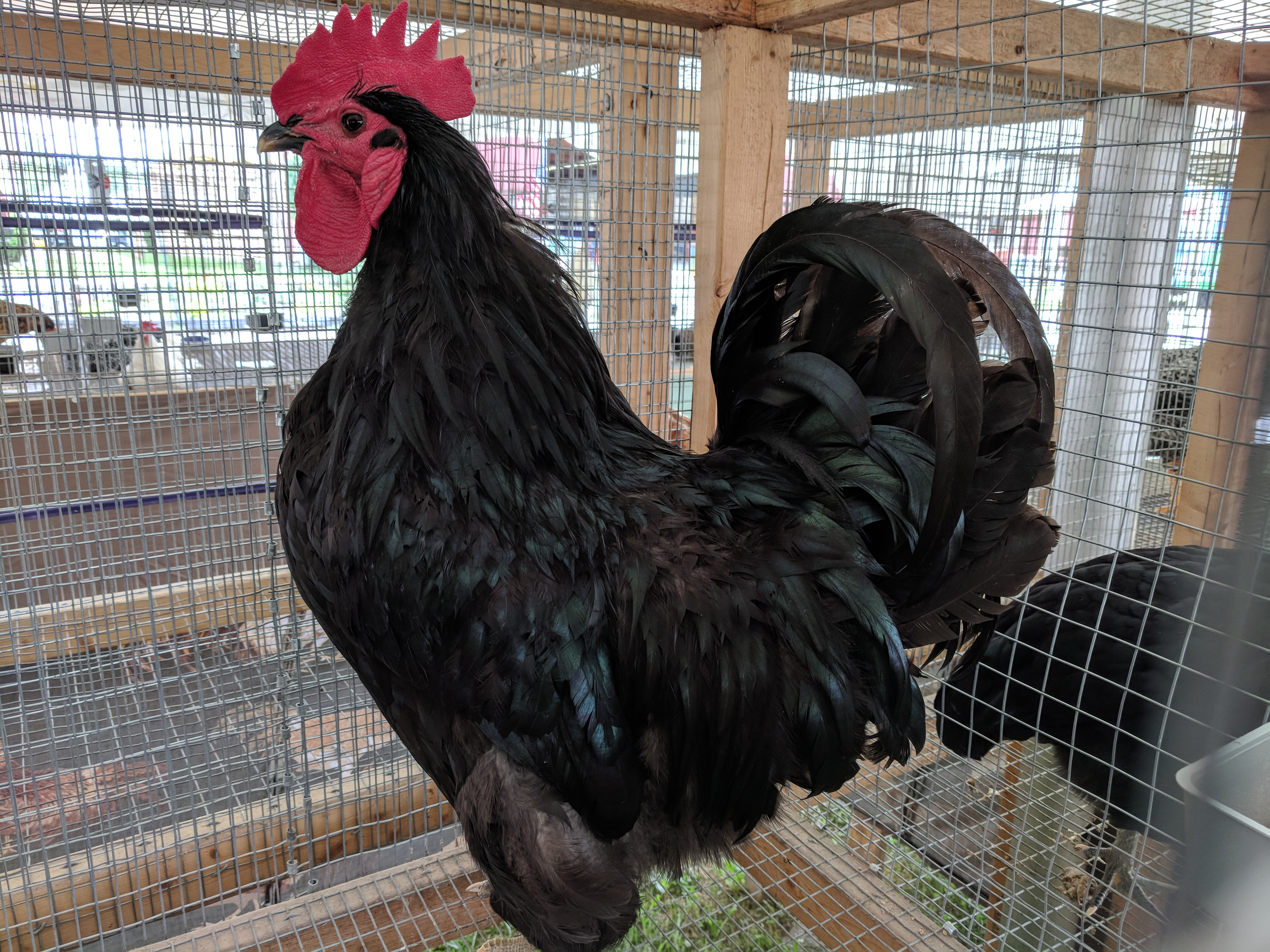
- A black cockerel at the County Fair in Ontario County, New York
- Conservation status: Livestock Conservancy: Watch
- Country of origin: United States

Traits
- Weight: Male: Standard: 13 lb (5.9 kg) Bantam: 38 oz (1.1 kg); Female: Standard: 10 lb (4.5 kg) Bantam: 34 oz (0.96 kg)
- Skin color: yellow
- Egg color: brown
- Comb type: single

Classification
- APA: American
- ABA: single comb, clean legged
- PCGB: rare soft feather: heavy
- Chicken; Gallus gallus domesticus

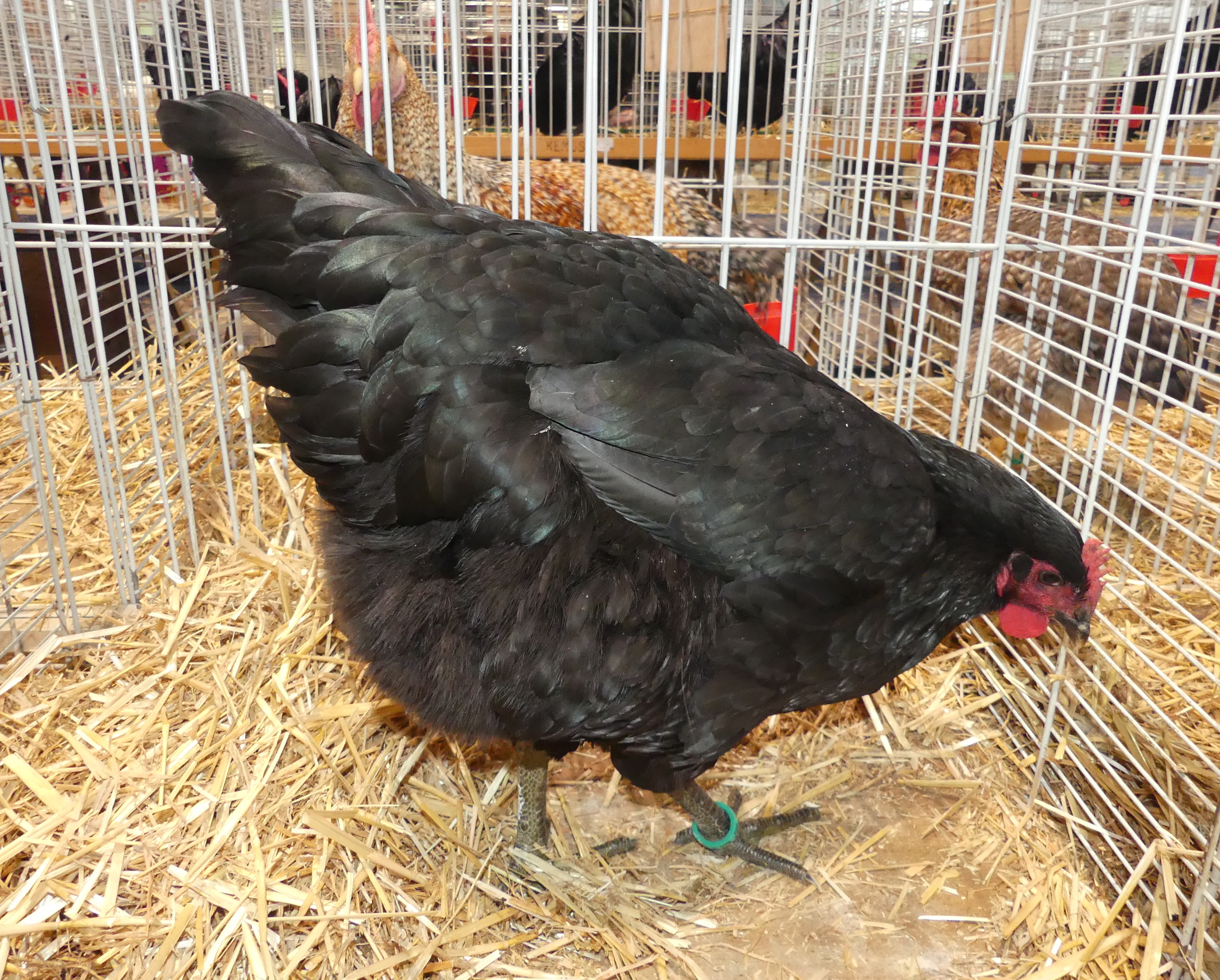
Hen bird

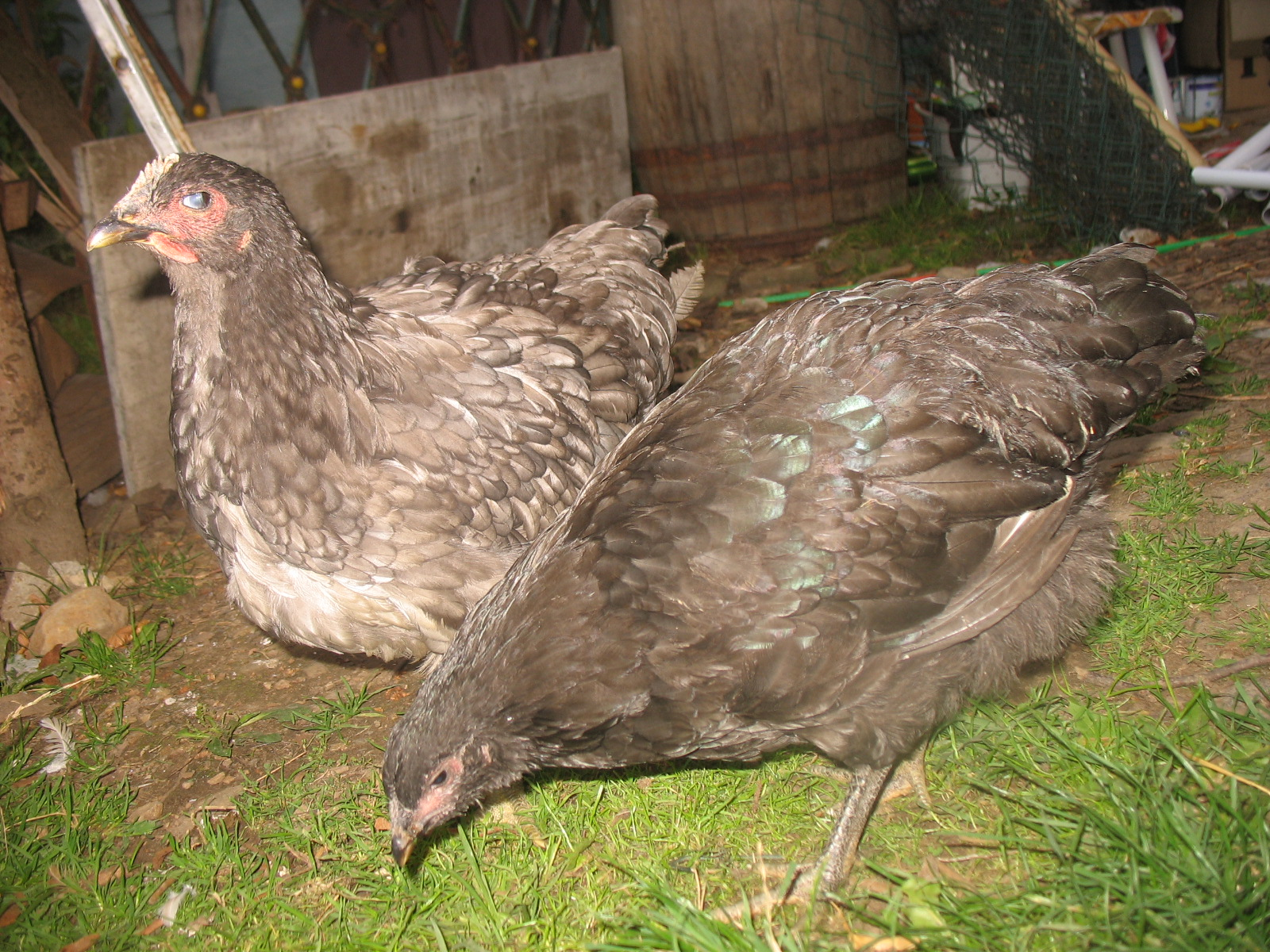
Pullets

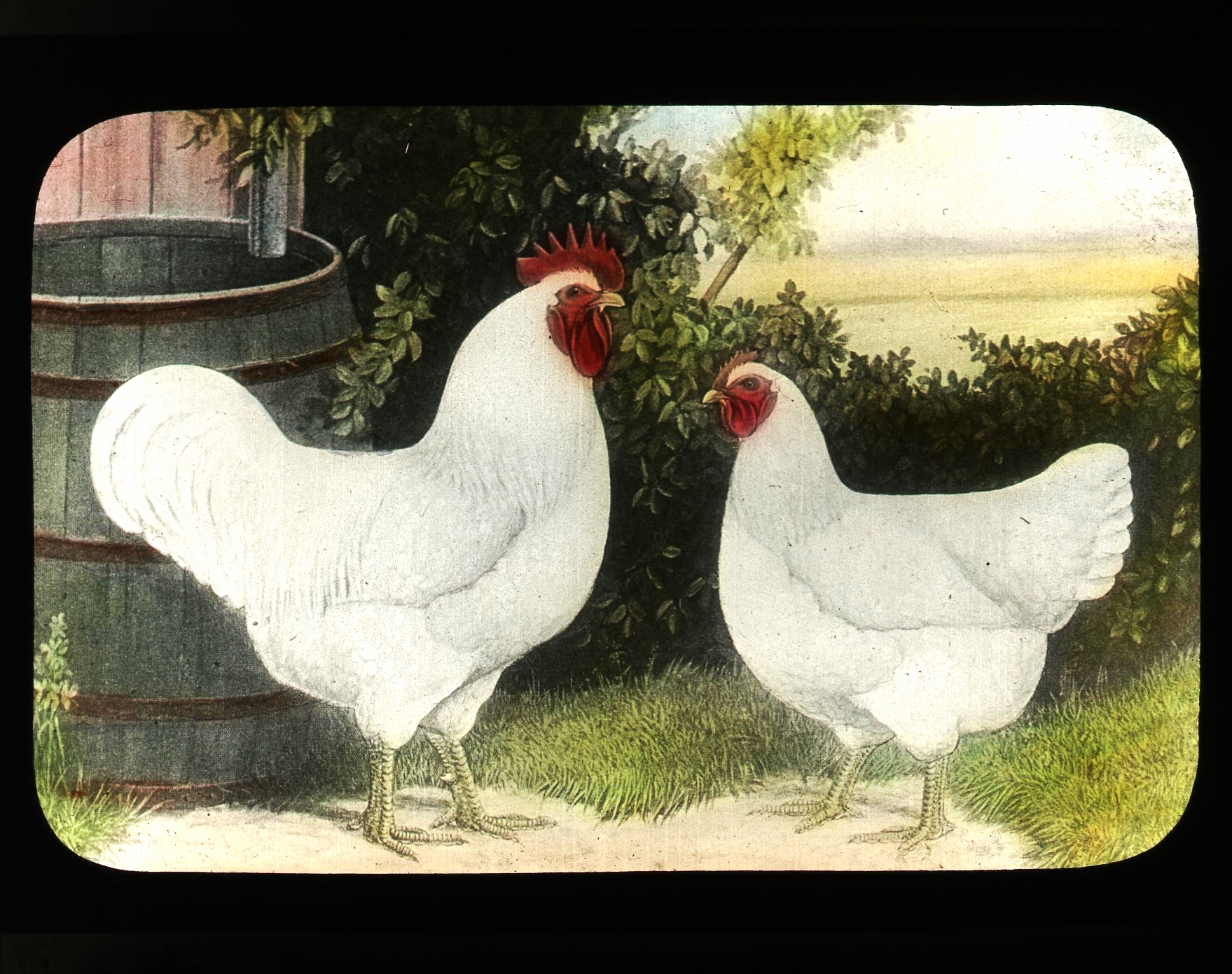
White cock and hen

The Jersey Giant is an American breed of domestic chicken. It was created in Burlington County, New Jersey, in the late nineteenth century. It is among the heaviest of all chicken breeds.

== History ==
The Jersey Giant was created by John and Thomas Black, with the intent of replacing the turkey, the kind of poultry used primarily for meat at the time. It was produced by crossing black Javas, black Langshans, and dark Brahmas, and was added to the Standard of Perfection of the American Poultry Association in 1922. The white variety was added in 1947, and the blue in 2002. The black is, on average, a pound heavier than the white. Though its present size is considerable, it was heavier in the past. For a time, these birds were raised as capons and as broilers by the meat industry until faster-growing modern industrial strains put an end to this use.

== Characteristics ==
A large amount of food and time is required for the Jersey Giant to reach its full size. It is a calm and docile breed; the cocks are rarely aggressive. The hens lay very large brown eggs, and are fair layers overall, known particularly as good winter layers. The birds are robust and fairly cold-hardy. The breed's plumage comes in blue as well as black and white; legs are willow in hue. Jersey Giant hens will go broody.
