= Catalana =

Spanish breed of domestic chicken

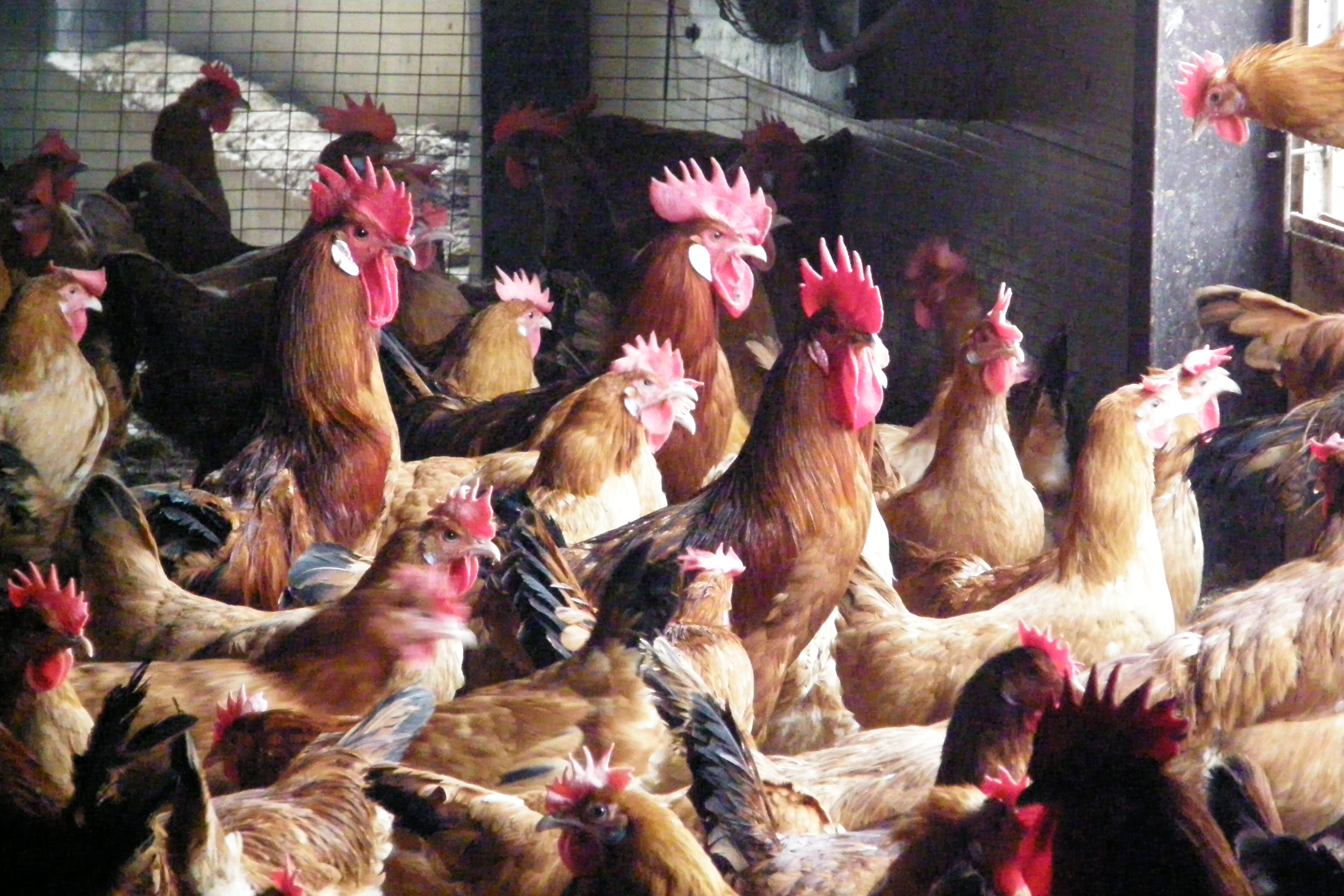
- Other names: Catalan: Pota Blava; Spanish: Gallina del Prat; Catalana del Prat; Catalana del Prat Leonada; Prat; Buff Catalana
- Country of origin: Spain
- Distribution: Catalonia; throughout Spain; Europe; North and South America
- Standard: MAGRAMA
- Use: dual-purpose

Traits
- Weight: Male: 3.2–3.7 kg; Female: 2.3–2.7 kg
- Egg color: pinkish cream
- Comb type: single

Classification
- APA: continental
- EE: recognised in France, Germany, Italy, Netherlands

Notes
- blue legs
- Chicken; Gallus gallus domesticus

The Catalana, Catalan: Pota Blava, Spanish: Gallina del Prat or Catalana del Prat, is a Spanish breed of domestic chicken. It originates in the area of El Prat de Llobregat in the comarca of Baix Llobregat, in Catalonia in eastern Spain. It may also be called the Catalana del Prat Leonada or Buff Catalana for its golden plumage. The Catalana is a hardy dual-purpose breed kept for both eggs and meat.

The Catalana was included in the Standard of Perfection of the American Poultry Association in 1949.
