= Lamona =

American breed of chicken

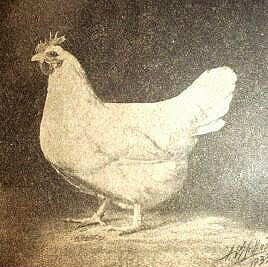
- A pullet in 1933
- Country of origin: United States

Traits
- Skin color: yellow
- Egg color: white
- Comb type: single

Classification
- APA: American
- ABA: single comb clean legged
- Chicken; Gallus gallus domesticus

The Lamona is an American breed of chicken. It was developed from 1912 by Harry S. Lamon, who was the senior poultry expert of the Bureau of Animal Industry, at the Beltsville Agricultural Research Center of the Department of Agriculture in Beltsville, Maryland.

== History ==
Harry S. Lamon was the senior poultry expert of the Bureau of Animal Industry of the U.S. Department of Agriculture. From 1912, working at the Henry A. Wallace Beltsville Agricultural Research Center in Beltsville, Maryland, he crossed white Plymouth Rocks, silver-gray Dorkings and white Leghorns to produce a breed with good egg-laying capabilities which would – unlike most layer breeds – also provide a moderately tender carcase when its laying career was over. In 1933 this was admitted to the Standard of Perfection of the American Poultry Association as the Lamona. A bantam Lamona was recognized by the APA in 1960.

By the 1980s the Lamona was close to extinction. Some breeders, among them Marion Nash of Illinois, perpetuated the breed for a time. The American Livestock Breeds Conservancy reported one or two breeding flocks still in existence in 2005. In 2013 it reported that it had been unable to identify any remaining stock descending from the original breed.

== Characteristics ==
The Lamona weighs more than the light Leghorn, but less than the large Plymouth Rock and Dorking. They have yellow skin and white plumage, which makes them ideal meat birds for the U.S. market. They have single combs and – unlike other breeds that lay white eggs – red earlobes. Unlike most layer hens, Lamonas remain moderately tender as a meat bird after their laying career is over.
