= Java chicken =

Breed of chicken

Java
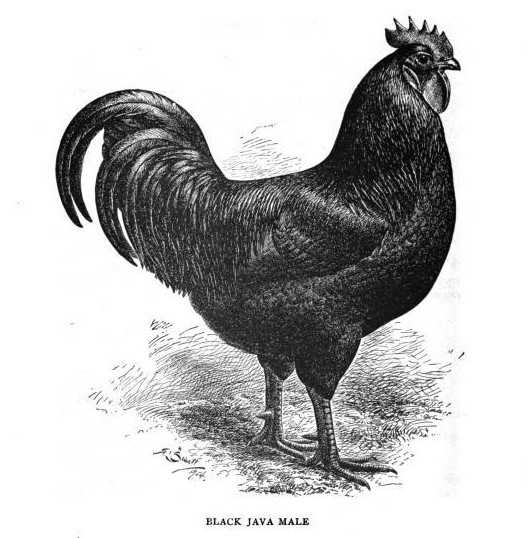
- Conservation status: critical
- Country of origin: United States
- Standard: APA

Traits
- Weight: Male: 4.3 kg (9.5 lb); Female: 2.9–3.4 kg (6.5–7.5 lb)
- Egg color: brown
- Comb type: single

Classification
- APA: American
- Chicken; Gallus gallus domesticus

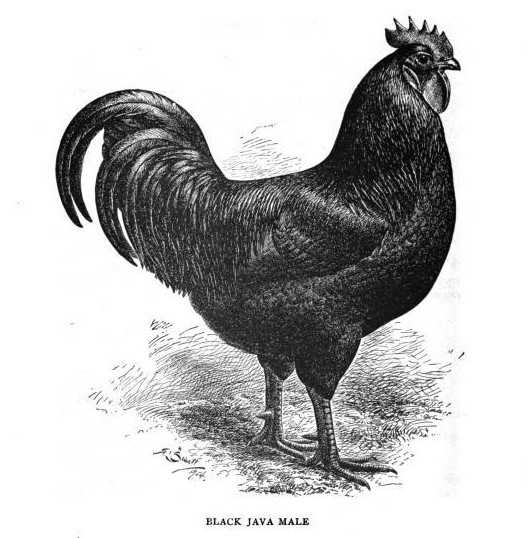
An illustration of the ideal Black Java rooster in the American Standard of Perfection cir. 1905

The Java is a breed of chicken originating in the United States. Despite the breed's name, a reference to the island of Java, it was developed in the U.S. from chickens of unknown Asian extraction. It is one of the oldest American chickens, forming the basis for many other breeds, but is critically endangered today. Javas are large birds with a sturdy appearance. They are hardy, and are well-suited for both meat and egg production, especially by small-scale farms, homesteads, and backyard keepers.

== History ==
After the Dominique, the Java is the oldest breed of chicken created in the U.S. Though its name would suggest a Javan derivation, it is not known exactly where in Asia its ancestors came from. It was first mentioned in print in 1835, but it is thought to have been present well before this time. Javas were especially notable as meat production birds throughout the 19th century, with their popularity peaking in the latter half of that century.

The Java is a key foundation breed for the American class of chickens, having contributed significantly to major modern fowl such as the Jersey Giant, Rhode Island Red and Plymouth Rock. They are also likely to be the source of the yellow skin in contemporary Dominiques, which once had white skin.

The Java was first recognized officially by acceptance in the American Poultry Association's Standard of Perfection in 1883. The White, Black, and Mottled varieties were all originally described in the Standard, but the White was removed in 1910 because it was thought to be too similar to the White Plymouth Rock. It eventually disappeared in the 1950s. There was also an Auburn type which was the basis for the Rhode Island Red, but it died out by 1870.

Javas had nearly vanished by the end of the 20th century, having been pushed to fringes of the poultry world by the intense focus on one or two breeds by commercial growers, and the introduction of innumerable new and exotic breeds to poultry fancy. Beginning in the 1990s, breeders and conservation organizations began to make a more concerted effort to save the Java. In particular, the Garfield Farm Museum in Illinois has played a pivotal role in the preservation of Javas in the 21st century. Beginning with Mottled and Black Javas, sports from the Garfield flock have revived the White variety. The Garfield Farm was also supported by the Museum of Science and Industry in Chicago, which hatches Java chicks as part of their exhibit on genetics.

The American Livestock Breeds Conservancy continues to list Javas as Critical on its watchlist, meaning fewer than 500 breeding birds from five or fewer primary breeding flocks are known (this does not take into account the population of non-breeding flocks). The breed is also listed as part of Slow Food USA's Ark of Taste, a catalog of heritage foods in danger of extinction. The Rosecomb bantam breed in the United States is called a Java in the Netherlands, the two breeds are very different.

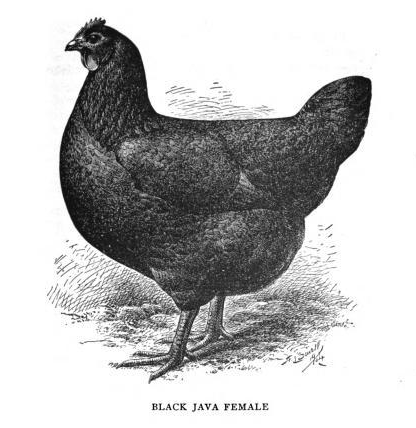
Illustration of the ideal Black Java female in the 1905 Standard of Perfection

== Characteristics ==
Javas are heavy chickens, with roosters weighing around 4.3 kilograms (9.5 pounds) and hens 2.9–3.4 kg (6.5–7.5 lb). They have a very long, broad back and a deep breast, which makes for a solid, rectangular build. They have small earlobes and medium size combs and wattles, all of which are red in color. Javas have single combs, but they have a shape which suggests the influence of a pea-combed breed in their development.

Javas appear in three color variations today: Black, Mottled, and White. The Black has black shanks and beaks, though some yellow may appear in the legs. The plumage is a uniform black hue that has a dark green sheen in the light. The Mottled and White have mostly yellow skin, with horn colored beaks. The plumage of the Mottled is a black base with white markings on the tips of feathers, which imparts a spotted appearance.

== Use ==
Javas are valued for their dual-purpose characteristics. Though they are slow-growing compared to the broilers used by the commercial chicken industry today, they produce a good carcass. Hens lay a respectable number of large, brown eggs and will go broody. Javas are particularly known as good foragers, needing less supplementary feed than many breeds when allowed to free range. Like many large breeds, they are known to be docile in temperament, and hardy in inclement weather. In general, Javas are particularly suitable for keepers of smaller flocks who require a good dual-purpose chicken.

== See also ==
- List of chicken breeds
