= American Bantam Association =

Association of breeders of bantam poultry

- Formation: 1914
- Purpose: Poultry Fancy
- Location: Augusta, NJ
- Region served: U.S. & Canada
- President: Matt Lhamon
- Affiliations: American Poultry Association
- Website: bantamclub.com

The American Bantam Association is a poultry fancy association for breeders of bantam poultry. It publishes the Bantam Standard, with detailed descriptions of all the bantam breeds and varieties that it recognizes; in most – but not all – cases, these are the same as those recognised by the American Poultry Association. It also publishes a quarterly magazine and annual yearbook, hosts poultry shows and provides judges for them, and provides information on bantam breeds.

It sanctions or has sanctioned a number of poultry shows across the United States held by local groups, such as the Poultry and Rare Bird Show at the Los Angeles County Fair and the Ohio National.

== History ==
The first president of the association was Charles E. Rockenstyie, who died in 1944.
