= List of German chicken breeds =

This is a list of chicken breeds usually considered to be of German origin. Some may have complex or obscure histories, so inclusion here does not necessarily imply that a breed is predominantly or exclusively from Germany.

Name in German	English name if used	Notes	Image
Annaberger Haubenstrupphuhn			
Augsburger		standard and bantam	
Bergische Kräher		standard and bantam	
Bergische Schlotterkamm		standard and bantam	
Bielefelder Kennhuhn		standard and bantam	
Deutscher Sperber		standard and bantam	
Deutsches Lachshuhn		standard and bantam	
Deutsches Langschan	German Langshan	standard and bantam	
Deutsches Reichshuhn		standard and bantam	
Deutscher Sperber		standard and bantam	
Deutsches Zwerghuhn		true bantam	
Dresdner		standard and bantam	
Frankfurter Zwerghuhn		bantam	
Hamburger	Hamburg or Hamburgh	standard and bantam	
Italiener	German Leghorn	standard and bantam with single or rose comb	
Kaulhuhn		standard and bantam	
Kraienkopp		standard and bantam	
Krüper		standard and bantam	
Lakenfelder Huhn	Lakenvelder	standard and bantam	
Niederrheiner		standard and bantam	
Ostfriesische Möwe		standard and bantam	
Pfälzer Kämpfer			
Phönix	Phoenix	standard and bantam	
Ramelsloher			
Rheinländer		standard and bantam	
Ruhlaer Zwerg-Kaulhuhn		bantam	
Sachsenhuhn		standard and bantam	
Strupphuhn	Frizzle	standard and bantam	
Sundheimer		standard and bantam	
Thüringer Barthuhn		standard and bantam	
Tuzo	.	true bantam	
Vogtländer			
Vorwerkhuhn	Vorwerk	standard and bantam	
Westfälische Totleger			
Winsener Masthuhn			
Yokohama		standard and bantam	
