= List of Dutch chicken breeds =

This is a list of chicken breeds usually considered to be of Dutch origin. Some may have complex or obscure histories, so inclusion here does not necessarily imply that a breed is predominantly or exclusively from the Netherlands.

Name in Dutch	English name if used	Notes	Image
Assendelfts Hoen		standard and bantam	
Baardkuifhoen		standard and bantam	
Barnevelder		standard and bantam	
Brabanter		standard and bantam	
Chaams Hoen		standard	
Drentse Hoen		standard and bantam	
Eikenburger kriel	.	bantam	
Fries Hoen	Friesian	standard and bantam	
Groninger Meeuw		standard and bantam	
Hervehoen; Mergellandhoen		standard	
Hollandse Kriel	Dutch Bantam	bantam	
Hollandse Kuifhoen	Polish chicken	standard and bantam	
Hollands Hoen		standard and bantam	
Kraaikop, Breda		standard and bantam	
Lakenvelder		standard and bantam	
Nederlandse Leghorn		standard	
Nederlandse Sabelpootkriel	Booted Bantam	bantam	
Noord-Hollandse Blauwe	North Holland Blue	standard	
Schijndelaar		standard	
Twents Hoen	Kraienkoppe	standard and bantam	
Uilebaard	Dutch Owlbeard	standard and bantam	
Welsumer	Welsummer	standard and bantam	
