= Brakel =

Brakel may refer to:

Places

- Brakel, Belgium, East Flanders, Belgium
- Brakel, Germany, North Rhine-Westphalia, Germany
- Brakel (Gelderland), Gelderland, Netherlands
- Brakel (North Brabant), North Brabant, Netherlands

Other uses

- Wilhelmus à Brakel (1635–1711), also known as "Father Brakel", a Reformed minister
- Braekel or Brakel, a breed of chicken
