= Friesian chicken =

Dutch breed of chicken

Friesian
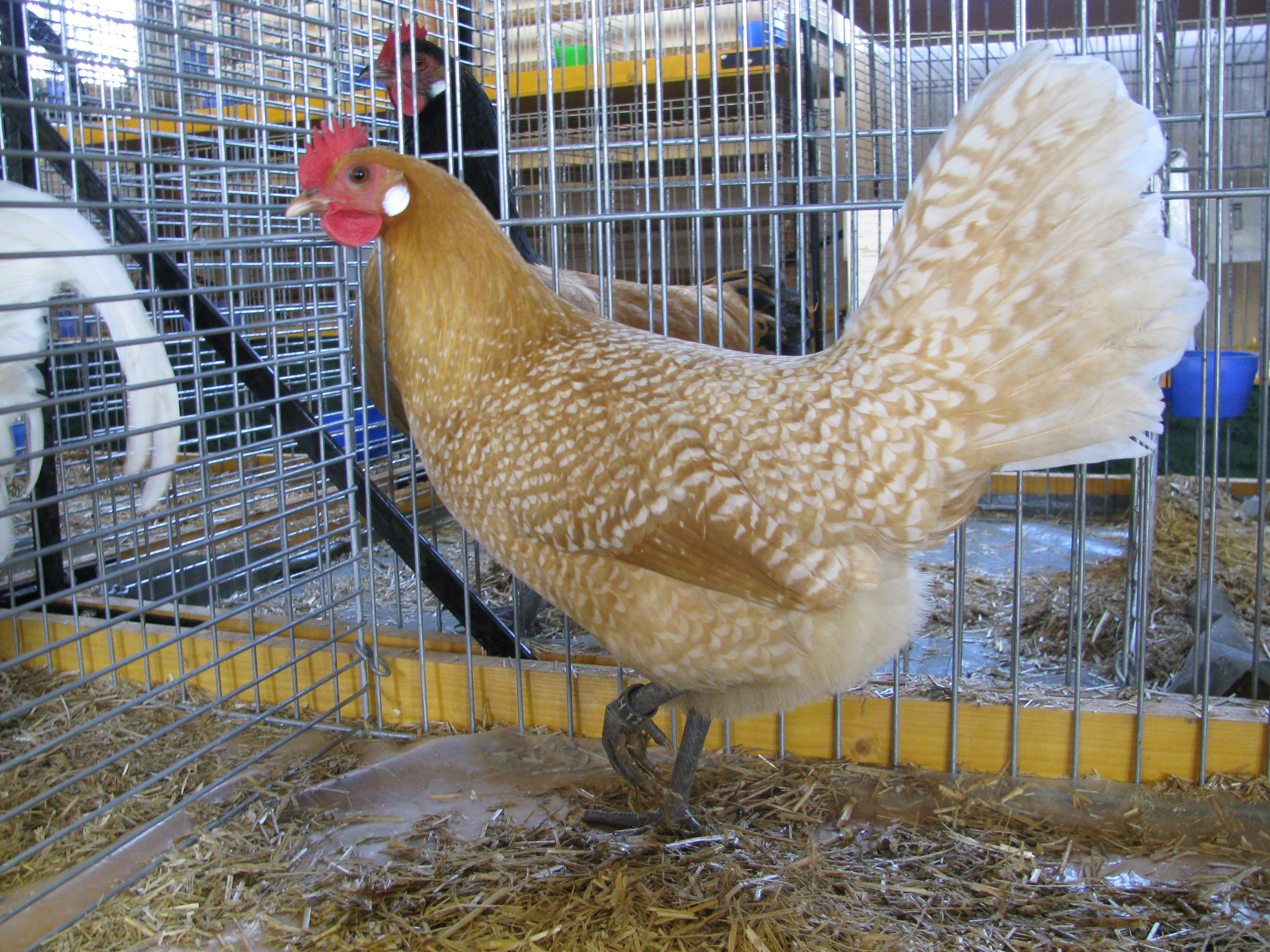
- Chamois-pencilled hen

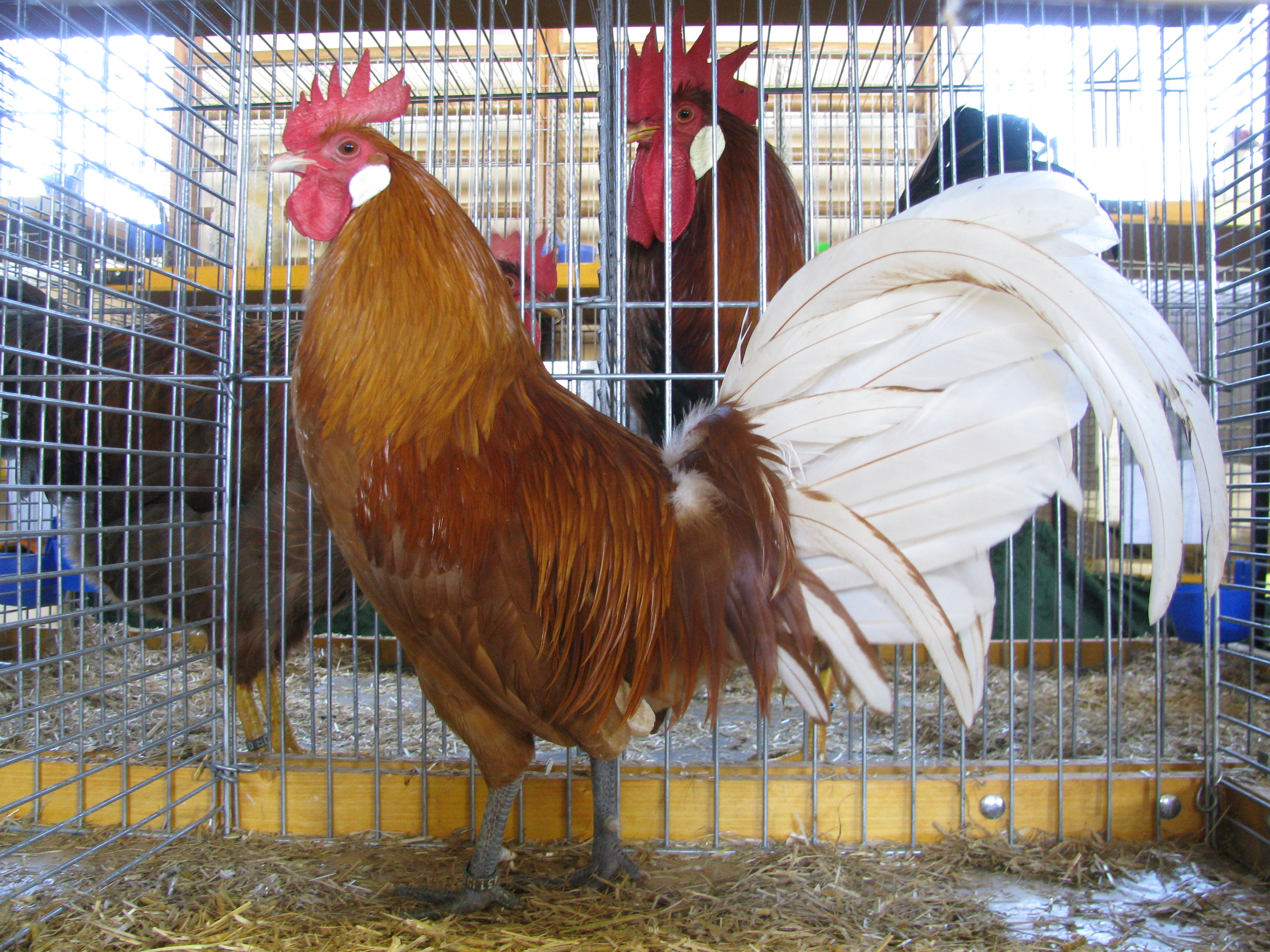
- Chamois-pencilled cock
- Conservation status: FAO (2007): bantam: endangered
- Other names: Frisian; Dutch: Fries Hoen
- Country of origin: Netherlands

Traits
- Weight: Male: standard: 1.4–1.6 kg; bantam: 550–650 g; Female: standard: 1.2–1.4 kg; bantam: 450–550 g
- Egg colour: white
- Comb type: single

Classification
- APA: no
- EE: yes
- PCGB: rare soft feather: light
- Chicken; Gallus gallus domesticus

The Friesian or Frisian, Dutch: Fries Hoen, is a traditional Dutch breed of chicken. It originates in Friesland, on the North Sea coast of the northern Netherlands.

== History ==
The Friesian originated in Friesland in the northern Netherlands, and is thought to be an ancient breed. It is apparently related to other breeds in the area such as the Assendelfts Hoen, the Drentse Hoen, the Groninger Meeuw, the Hollands Hoen, the Ostfriesische Möwe and the Westfälischer Totleger. The earliest written description may be that by R. Houwink in his Overzicht van alle bekende hoenderrassen, in hunne vormen en kleuren of 1909. From the early twentieth century the Friesian was supplanted as an egg-layer by more productive breeds such as the Barnevelder, the Leghorn, the Rhode Island Red and the Welsumer. During the First World War, it was not among the breeds for which a feed subsidy was available, and numbers fell. A breed society, the Fryske Hinne Klub, was formed in 1922. A monograph on the breed, Ús Fryske Hinnen by F. Hoogeveen, was published in 1947. A German breed society, the Sonderverein der Friesenhühner und Zwergfriesenhühner, was established in 1998.

== Characteristics ==
There are both standard-sized and bantam Friesians. The standard fowl is a light breed: cocks weigh 1.4–1.6 kg and hens 1.2–1.4 kg; the bantam is very small.

The birds stand fairly upright, and hold their tails high. The eyes are large and dark orange; the earlobes are small, oval and white; the comb is single, red, rather small, and has five or six serrations; the beak is horn-coloured; the legs are white in the cuckoo-patterned variety, slate-blue in all others.

Twelve colour varieties are recognised in the Netherlands, eleven in Germany, and three – chamois-pencilled, gold-pencilled and silver-pencilled – in the United Kingdom.

== Use ==
The hens are good layers of white eggs. They may give approximately 200 eggs per year, with an average weight of 52 g. Bantam hens lay about 120 eggs per year; the average weight is 30 g.
