= North Holland (disambiguation) =

North Holland is a province of the Netherlands.

North Holland may also refer to:

- The Northern Netherlands, see Geography of the Netherlands.
- North-Holland Publishing Company, an imprint of Elsevier
- North Holland Blue, a breed of chickens from North Holland
