= Tuzo =

Tuzo may refer to:

== People ==
- Harry Tuzo (1917–1998), British army officer
- John Tuzo Wilson (1908–1993), Canadian geophysicist and geologist

== Places ==
- Mount Tuzo, Canada
- Tuzo Wilson Seamounts

== Other ==
- Alto Rendimiento Tuzo, Mexican football club
- Tuzo (chicken), a German true bantam chicken breed
- Tuzo, one of two Large low-shear-velocity provinces in the Earth's mantle
