= Niederrheiner =

German breed of chicken

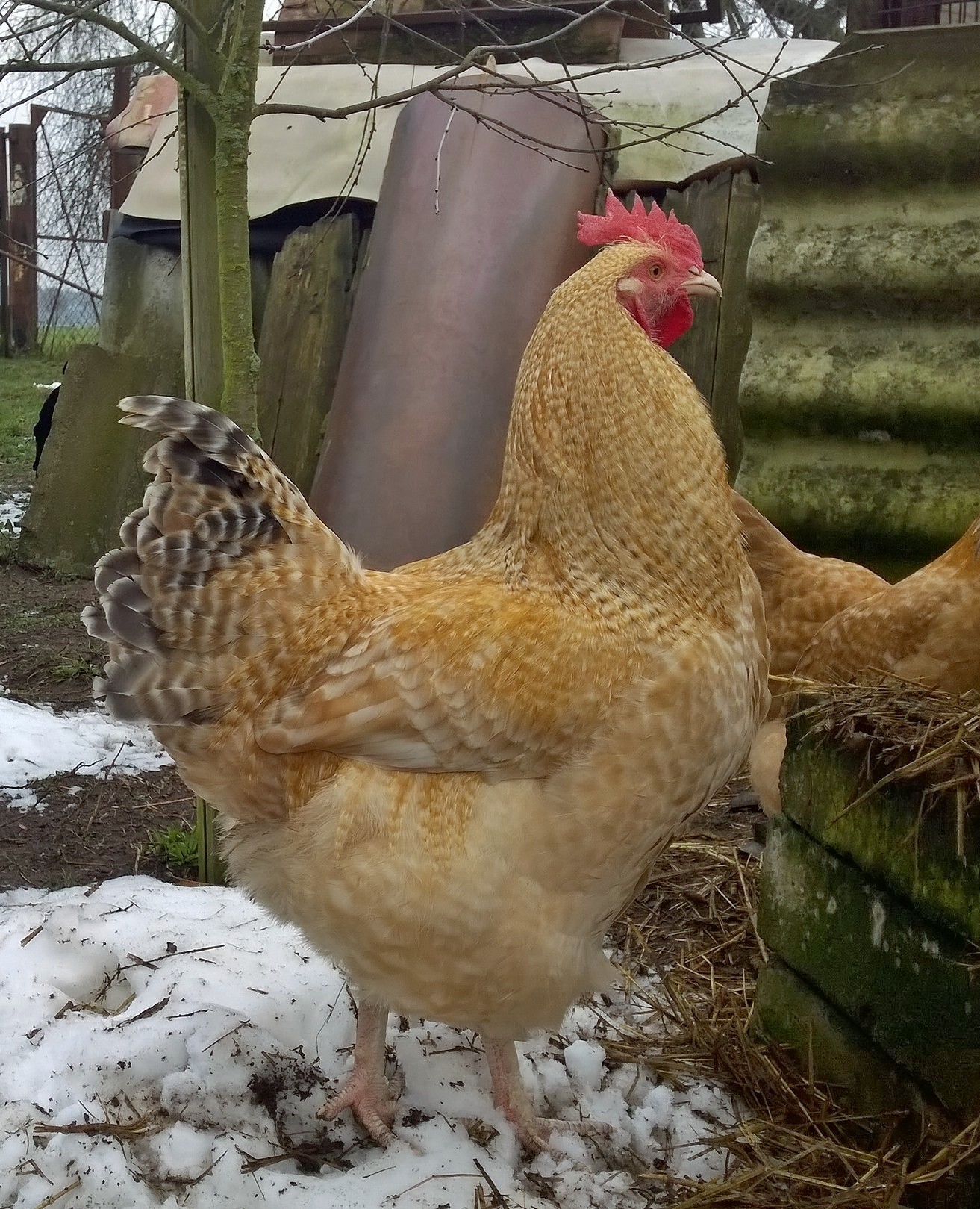
- Six-month-old cockerel, lemon cuckoo
- Conservation status: GEH (2001): endangered; FAO (2007): not at risk; DAD-IS (2022): at risk
- Country of origin: Germany
- Use: meat

Traits
- Weight: Male: Standard: 3.5-4 kg; Bantam: 1200 g; Female: Standard: 2.5-3 kg; Bantam: 1000 g
- Skin color: white
- Egg color: brown
- Comb type: single

Classification
- APA: no
- EE: yes
- PCGB: no
- Chicken; Gallus gallus domesticus

The Niederrheiner (German pronunciation: [ˈniːdɐˌʁaɪnɐ]) is a German breed of chicken. It is named for the Niederrhein or Lower Rhine region where it originated in the early twentieth century, and derives principally from the Dutch North Holland Blue meat chicken. It was recognized in Germany in 1943. In the twenty-first century it is an endangered breed.

A bantam version, the Zwerg-Niederrheiner, was developed from the standard-sized breed.

== History ==
The Niederrheiner was bred in the Niederrhein or Lower Rhine region of western Germany in the years before the Second World War. Birds of the North Holland Blue meat chicken, developed in Holland at the start of the century, had been brought to the area in the late 1920s, but had attracted little interest. Two breeders, Friedrich Regenstein and J. Jobs, crossed them with various other breeds, both heavy and light, to create the Niederrheiner. It received official recognition in 1943.

A breed census in 1997 found 1482 birds in the hands of 138 breeders. In 2001 the Niederrheiner was listed in category III, gefährdet ("endangered") on the Rote Liste of the Gesellschaft zur Erhaltung alter und gefährdeter Haustierrassen. In 2007 its conservation status was listed by the FAO as "not at risk"; in 2022 it was reported to DAD-IS as "at risk". In 2021 the breeding population was reported to be 1660, consisting of 308 cock birds and 1352 hens.

A bantam version, the Zwerg-Niederrheiner, was developed from the standard-sized breed. It was later used in the development of a bantam North Holland Blue.

== Characteristics ==
The Niederrheiner is closely similar to the North Holland Blue from which it derives, the principal difference being the absence of feathering on the legs.

Five plumage varieties are recognised by the Entente Européenne d’Aviculture et de Cuniculture: crele, silver, lemon cuckoo, blue cuckoo and birchen. The bantam is recognised in eight varieties.

The birds are docile and have little tendency to fly; hens are not good sitters. Ring size is 22 mm for cock birds, 20 mm for hens; for bantams, ring sizes are 15 mm and 13 mm respectively.

== Use ==
The Niederrheiner was bred as a meat chicken. It is fast-growing, and has fine white flesh and white skin. Standard-size hens lay approximately 200 cream or light brown eggs per year, with an average weight of about 55 g; bantam hens lay about 180 per year, averaging about 40 g in weight.

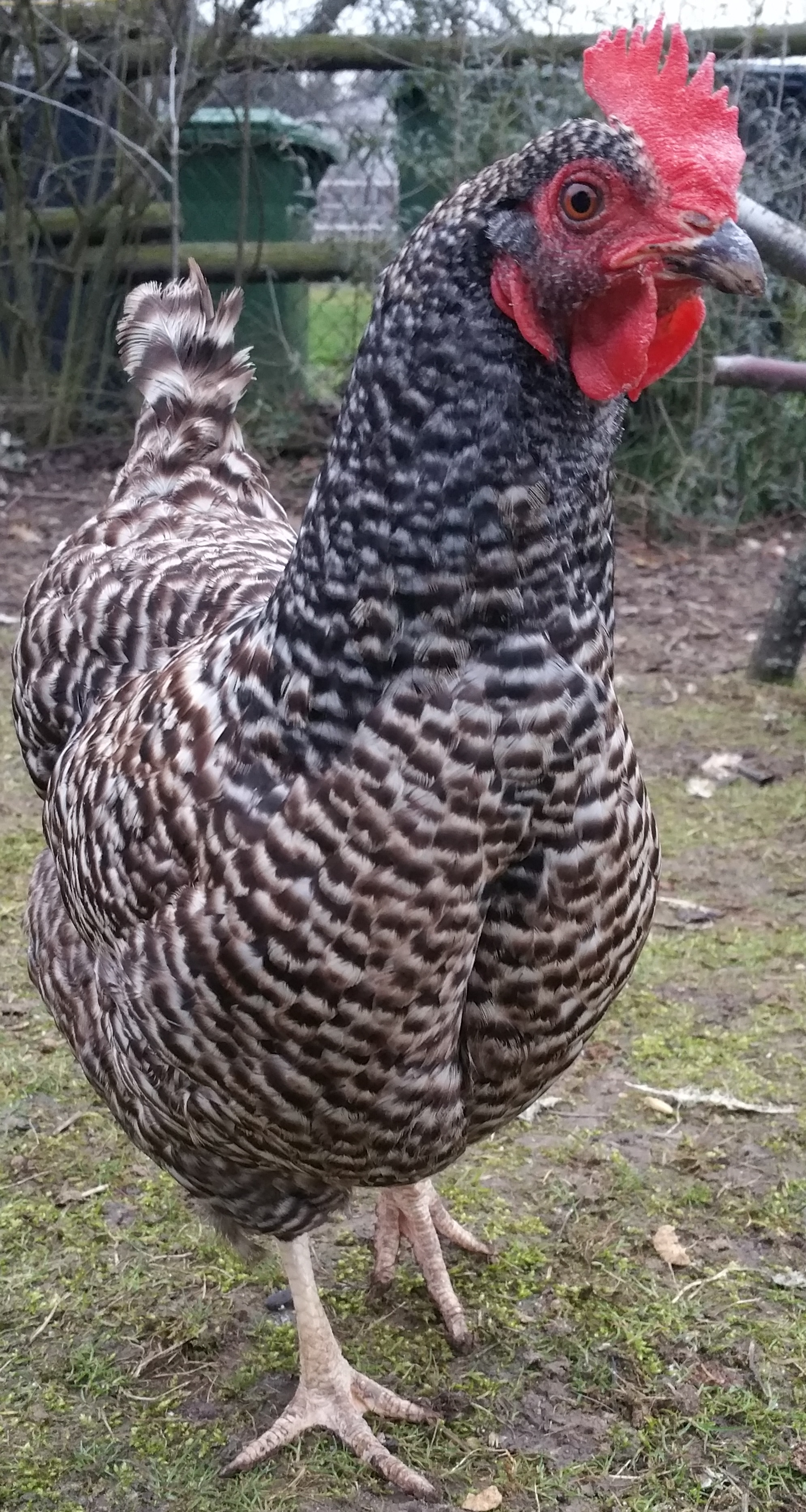
A blue cuckoo Niederrheiner hen

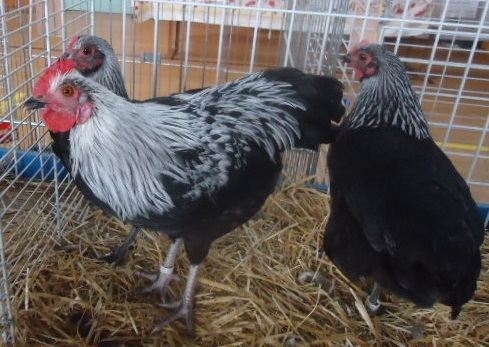
A birchen Niederrheiner bantam rooster and a pair of hens
