= Vorwerk chicken =

Breed of chicken

Vorwerk
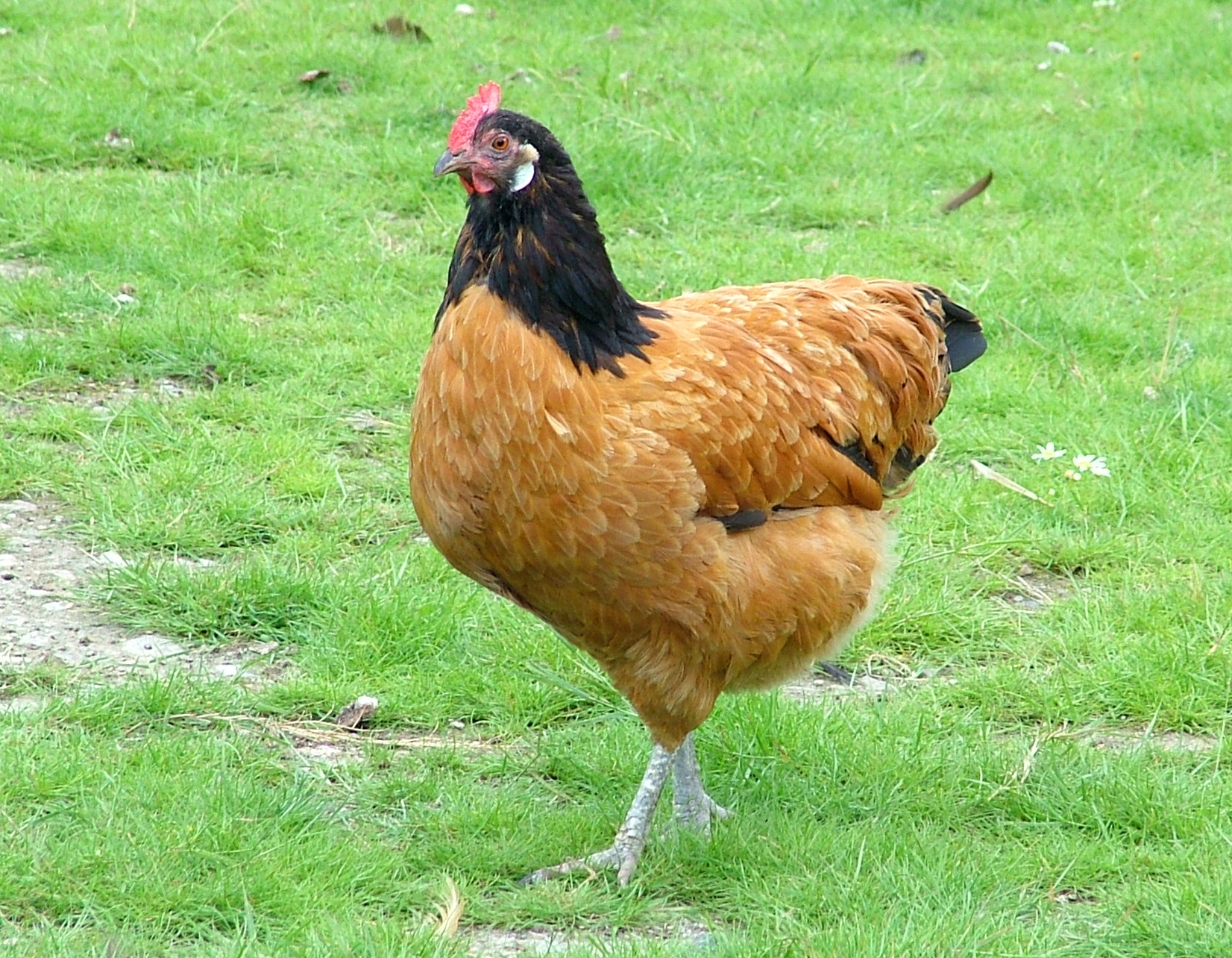
- A Vorwerk hen
- Other names: Vorwerkhuhn
- Country of origin: Germany

Traits
- Weight: Male: 2.5–3.0 kg; Female: 2.0–2.5 kg
- Comb type: single

Classification
- Chicken; Gallus gallus domesticus

The Vorwerk (German: Vorwerkhuhn, pronounced [ˈfoːɐvɛʁkˌhuːn]) is a breed of chicken originating in Germany. Though it is unrelated to the German company which produces the Vorwerk vacuum cleaner, it is the only chicken to share its name with a brand of household appliance. A rare fowl, it has distinctive black-and-gold plumage.

== History ==
Beginning in 1900, poultry breeder Oskar Vorwerk began to create a medium-sized, utilitarian fowl with the belted plumage pattern of the Lakenvelder. The key difference in appearance would be the Vorwerk's dark golden base color, rather than the white of the Lakenvelder. Thus, his chicken is sometimes incorrectly called the Golden Lakenvelder, especially in North America. The Golden Lakenvelder, a plumage variety, is a separate breed from the Vorwerk. Breeds used to create the Vorwerk included the Lakenvelder, Buff Orpington, Buff Sussex and Andalusian. By 1913, the Vorwerk was standardized. However, it never really gained widespread use, and is rare or non-existent outside Continental Europe.

=== Vorwerk bantam ===
In 1966, a U.S. man named Wilmar Vorwerk of New Ulm, Minnesota, developed an interest in the breed, but it had not been exported to North America. Thus, he created a bantam version from scratch using Lakenvelders, Buff and Blue Wyandottes, Black-tailed Buff and Buff Columbian Rosecombs. European fanciers have also independently miniaturized a bantam Vorwerk. Though the large fowl Vorwerk has never been accepted in the American Poultry Association's Standard of Perfection, the American Bantam Association has recognized the U.S. version of the Vorwerk Bantam.

== Characteristics ==
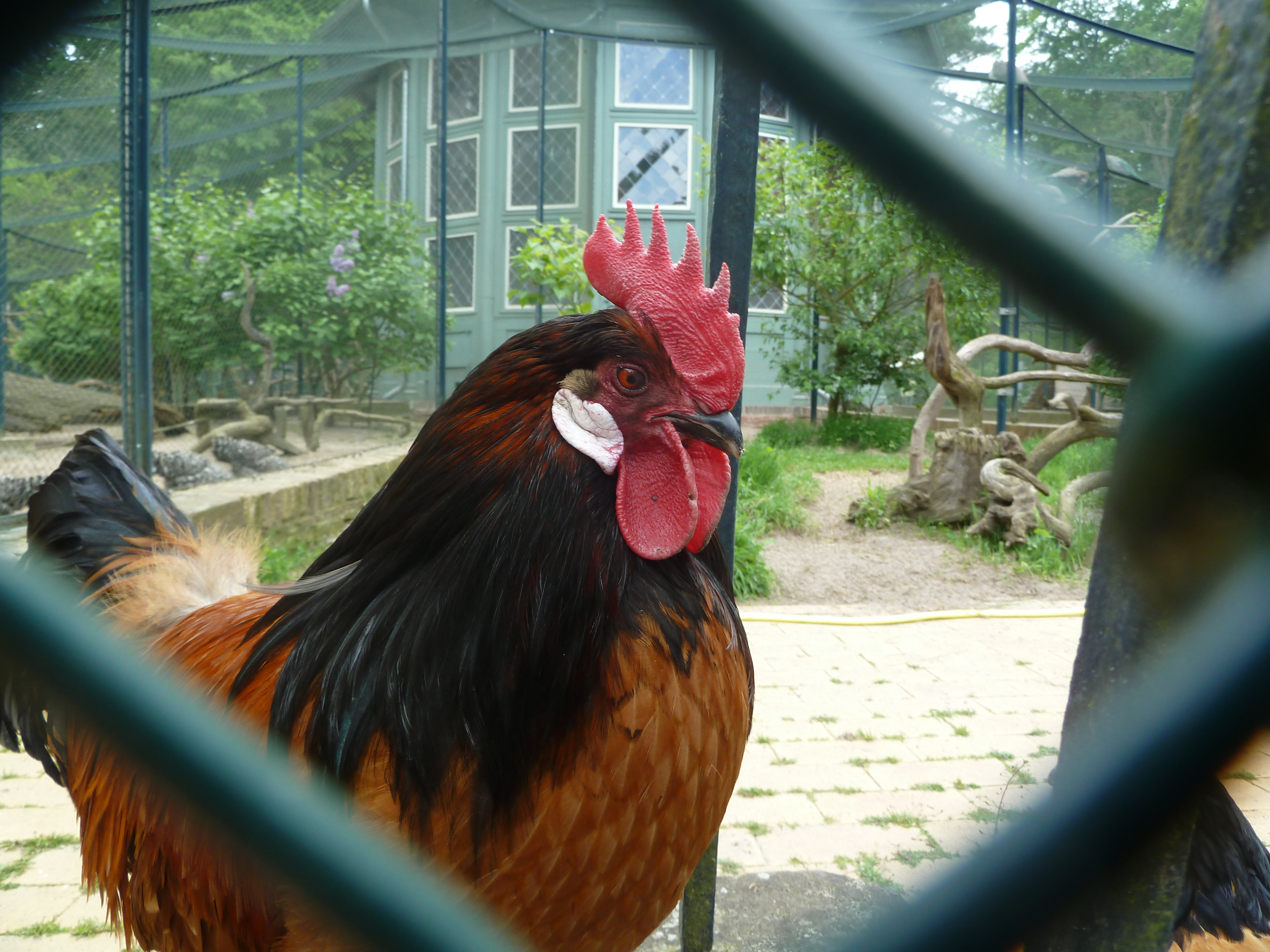
The rooster has a similar plumage as the hen

Vorwerks are a dual-purpose chicken suitable for both meat and egg production. Standard size males weigh 2.5–3.2 kilos (5.5–7.5 pounds), and females weigh 2–2.5 kilos (4.5–5.5 pounds). The European bantam standards are different from the US standards, which is understandable as they were produced using different breeds. In particular Bantam males in the US are 765 grams (27 ounces), and females in the US are 650 grams (23 ounces) but in Europe the breed is heavier at 910 grams for males and 680 grams for females. If you are showing in Europe it is well worth seeking out that standard rather than go by the US version. Large Vorwerk hens are good layers of cream-colored eggs, and will produce approximately 170 in a year. Bantams are also dual-purpose, but (like all bantams) lay smaller eggs and fewer of them.

Vorwerks are hardy, adaptable birds with economical appetites. In temperament, they are alert and active, but not necessarily flighty. In terms of plumage, their head, neck and tail are solid black, with the rest a buff color. The ideal of breed standards call for no black spotting in the buff areas, but in practicality this is very difficult to breed. Vorwerks sport a single comb, slate grey underfluff, and white earlobes.
