= Lakenvelder =

German/Dutch breed of domestic chicken

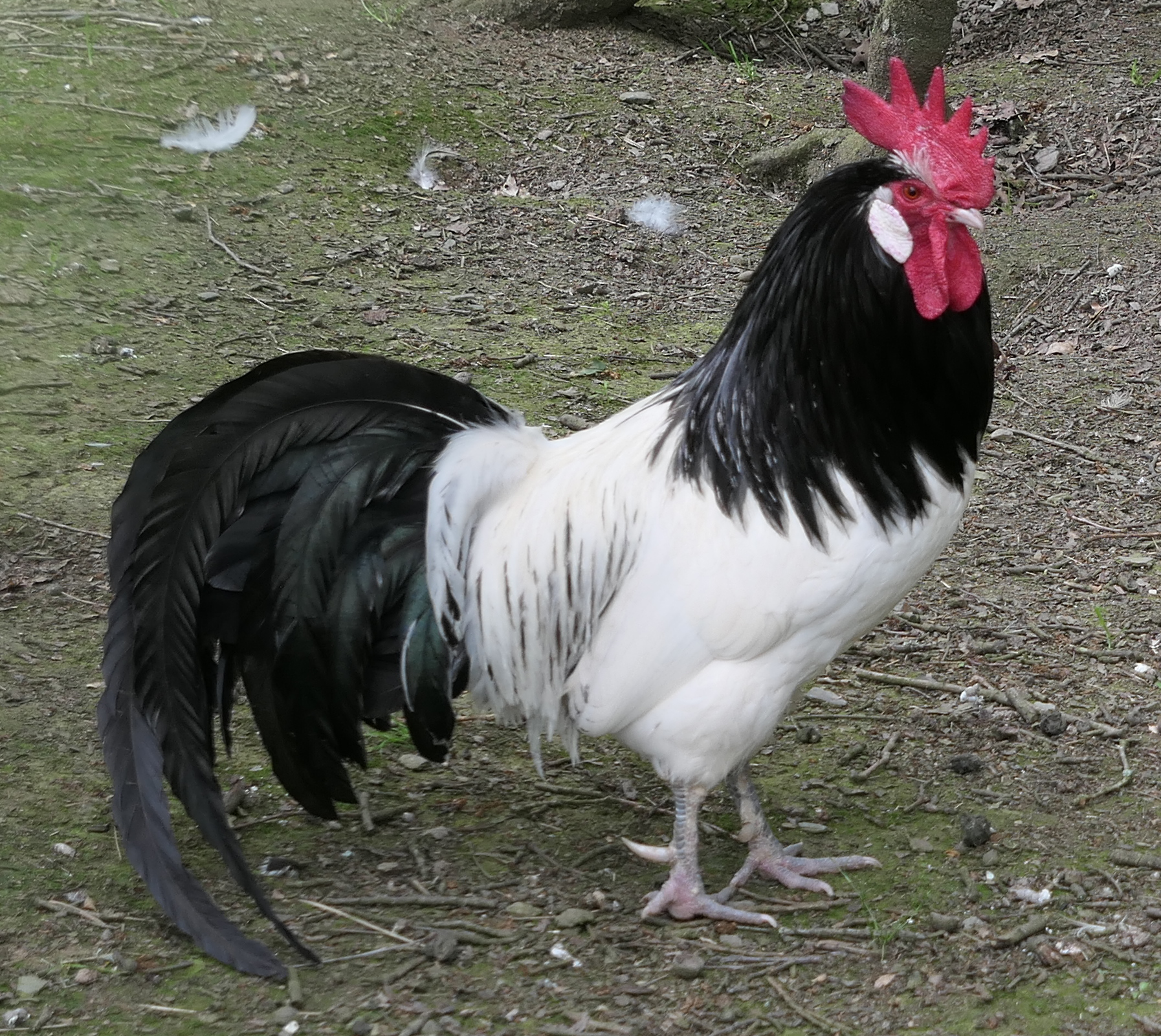
- Conservation status: GEH, Germany: III, endangered
- Other names: German: Lakenfelder
- Country of origin: Netherlands; Germany
- Use: eggs

Traits
- Weight: Male: up to 2.5 kg; Female: up to 2 kg
- Skin colour: white
- Egg colour: white to tinted
- Comb type: single, five-pointed

Classification
- APA: Continental
- PCGB: rare soft feather: light
- Chicken; Gallus gallus domesticus

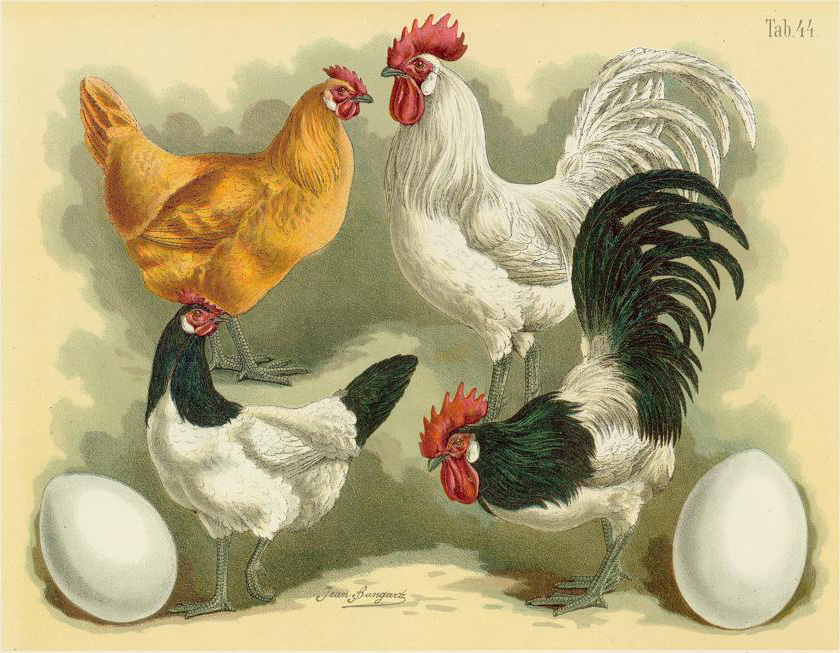
Lakenvelder pair (foreground) and Ramelslohers, plate from the Geflügel-Album of Jean Bungartz, 1885

The Lakenvelder /ˈlɑːkənvɛldər/ or Lakenfelder is a German/Dutch breed of domestic chicken from the Nordrhein-Westfalen area of Germany and neighbouring areas of the Netherlands. It was first recorded in 1727.

== History ==
The origins of the Lakenvelder are not clear. Two different histories are proposed: it may have originated in Holland, where it is documented from 1727, and its name may derive from that of the village of Lakerveld, in the municipality of Zederik in South Holland. An alternative history is that it originated in Germany in the area of Dielingen in Nordrhein-Westfalen, not far from the Dümmer See, where chickens with a black neck and tail and a white body occurred as sports of the local Westfälischer Totleger breed; these black-and-white birds were selectively bred by several breeders, and were first shown in 1835 by one named Wirz, from Haldem in Stemwede. They came to be known as Lakenvelder, and enjoyed considerable popularity until the arrival in the later nineteenth century of more productive imported breeds such as the Leghorn, after which numbers declined rapidly.

In Germany, a breeders' association, the Vereinigung der Lakenfelder Züchter, was formed in Hanover in 1907.

The Lakenvelder was first imported into Britain in 1901, and was shown in Shrewsbury in 1902. In the United States, it was admitted to the Standard of Perfection of the American Poultry Association in 1939.

The Lakenvelder is distributed in Germany and Holland, and is also present in Australia, Ireland, the United Kingdom and the United States. Its international conservation status was not listed as being at risk by the Food and Agriculture Organization of the United Nations in 2007, and in 2024 was listed in DAD-IS as "not at risk". In Germany it was listed in 2018 in category III, gefährdet ('extremely endangered') on the Rote Liste of the Gesellschaft zur Erhaltung alter und gefährdeter Haustierrassen; by 2024 it had been moved to category IV, Beobachtung ('watch') on that list, and was listed in DAD-IS as "at risk/vulnerable". In Holland its status in 2024 was "at risk/endangered", with a breeding population of 402 hens and 80 cocks.

== Characteristics ==
The head, neck hackle and tail of the Lakenvelder are solid black, without spots, ticks or stripes; the inner web of the wing primaries and secondaries is black. The rest of the bird is white with a pale blue-grey under-colour. The black-and-white pattern is reminiscent of the colouring of the Lakenvelder breed of cattle, which originated in the same area.

The eyes are bright chestnut or red, the beak dark horn, and the face, wattles and comb bright red, with white earlobes. The legs are slate-blue.

== Use ==
The Lakenvelder lays up to 160 white eggs, weighing up to 50 g each, per year.

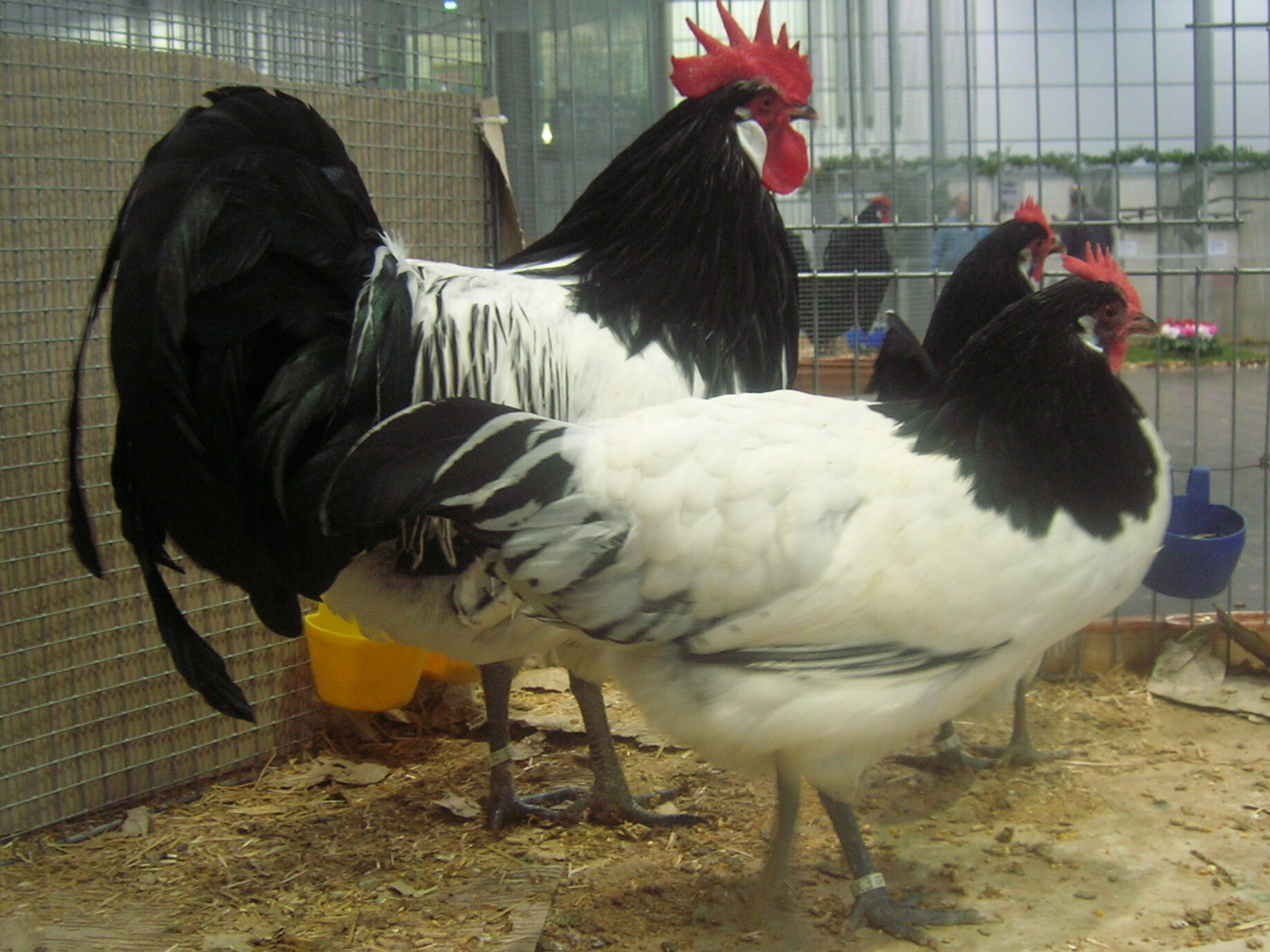
At a show in Leipzig

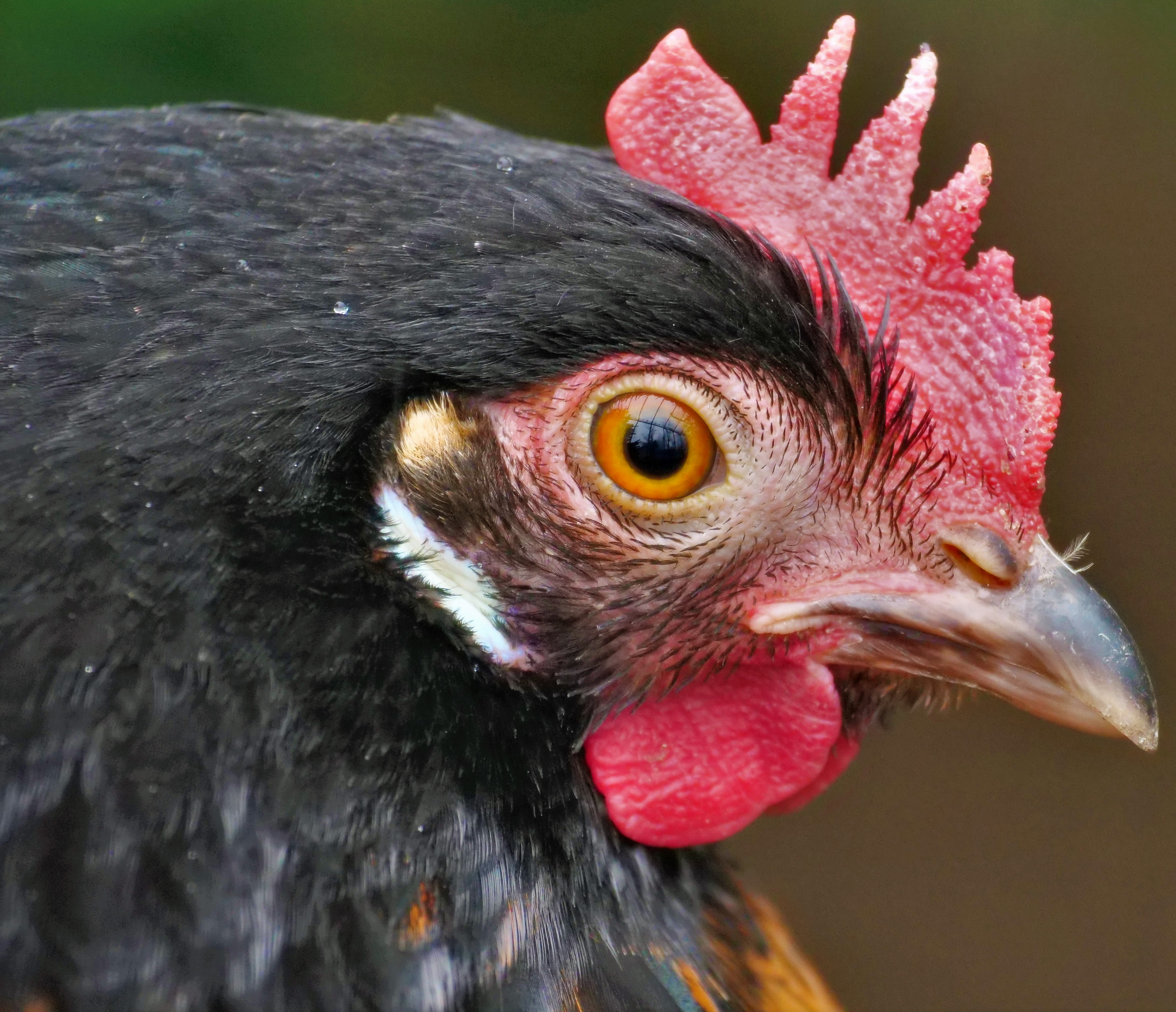
Cock, close-up of the head

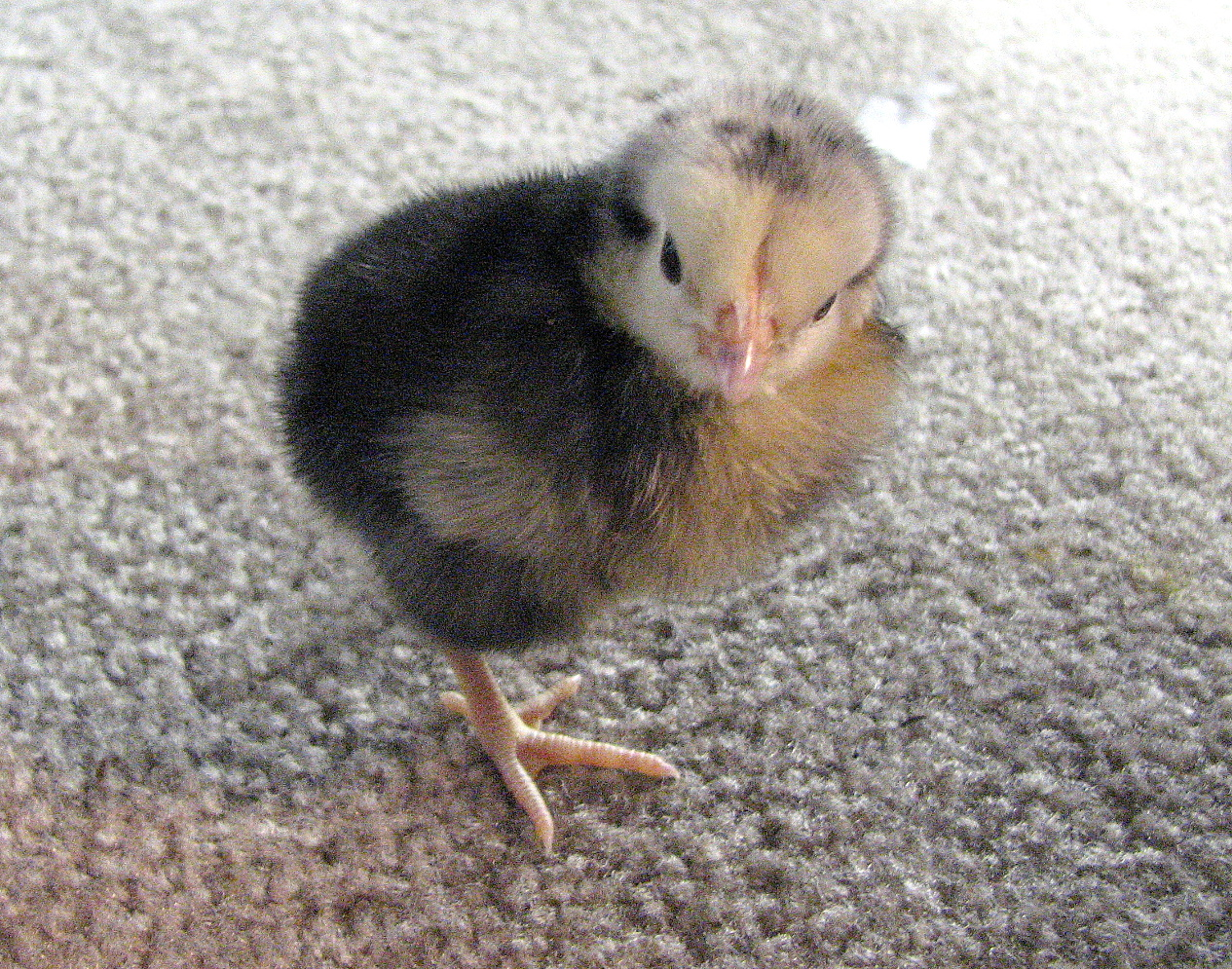
Three-day-old chick
