= Lakerveld =

- Hamlet
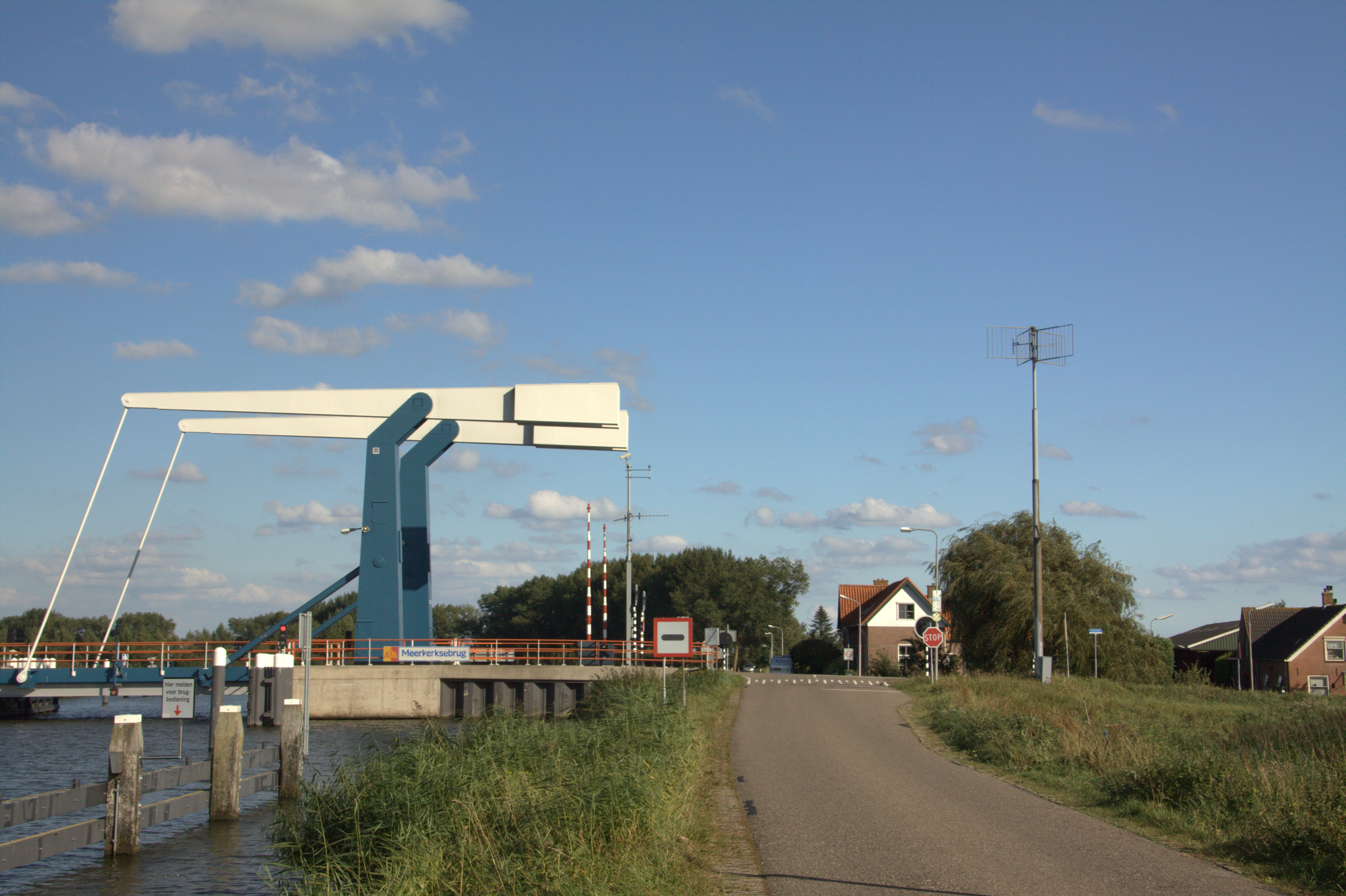
- Bridge at Lakerveld

- Location in the Netherlands Lakerveld (Netherlands)
- Coordinates: 51°57′42″N 5°1′8″E
- Country: Netherlands
- Province: Utrecht
- Municipality: Vijfheerenlanden

Area
  - Total: 8.86 km^{2} (3.42 sq mi)

Population (2021)
  - Total: 355
  - Density: 40.1/km^{2} (104/sq mi)
- Time zone: UTC+1 (CET)
  - Summer (DST): UTC+2 (CEST)
- Postal code: 4128
- Dialing code: 0347

Lakerveld is a hamlet in the Dutch province of Utrecht. It is a part of the municipality of Vijfheerenlanden, and lies about 9 km south of IJsselstein.

The hamlet was first mentioned in the 16th century as Laeckervelt, and means "field near the Laak (river)". Lakerveld has no place name signs. In 1840, it was home to 300 people.

== Gallery ==
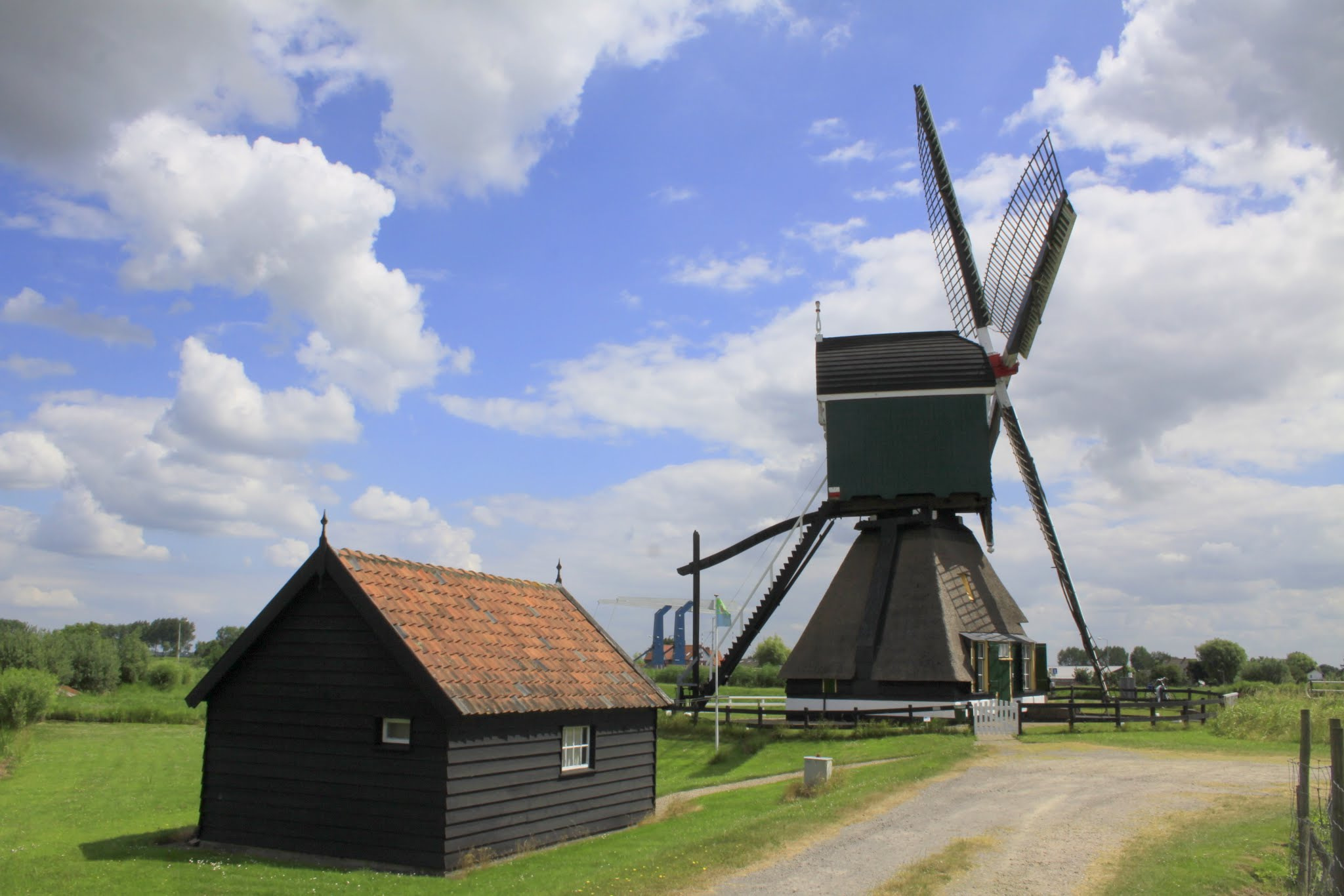
Windmill

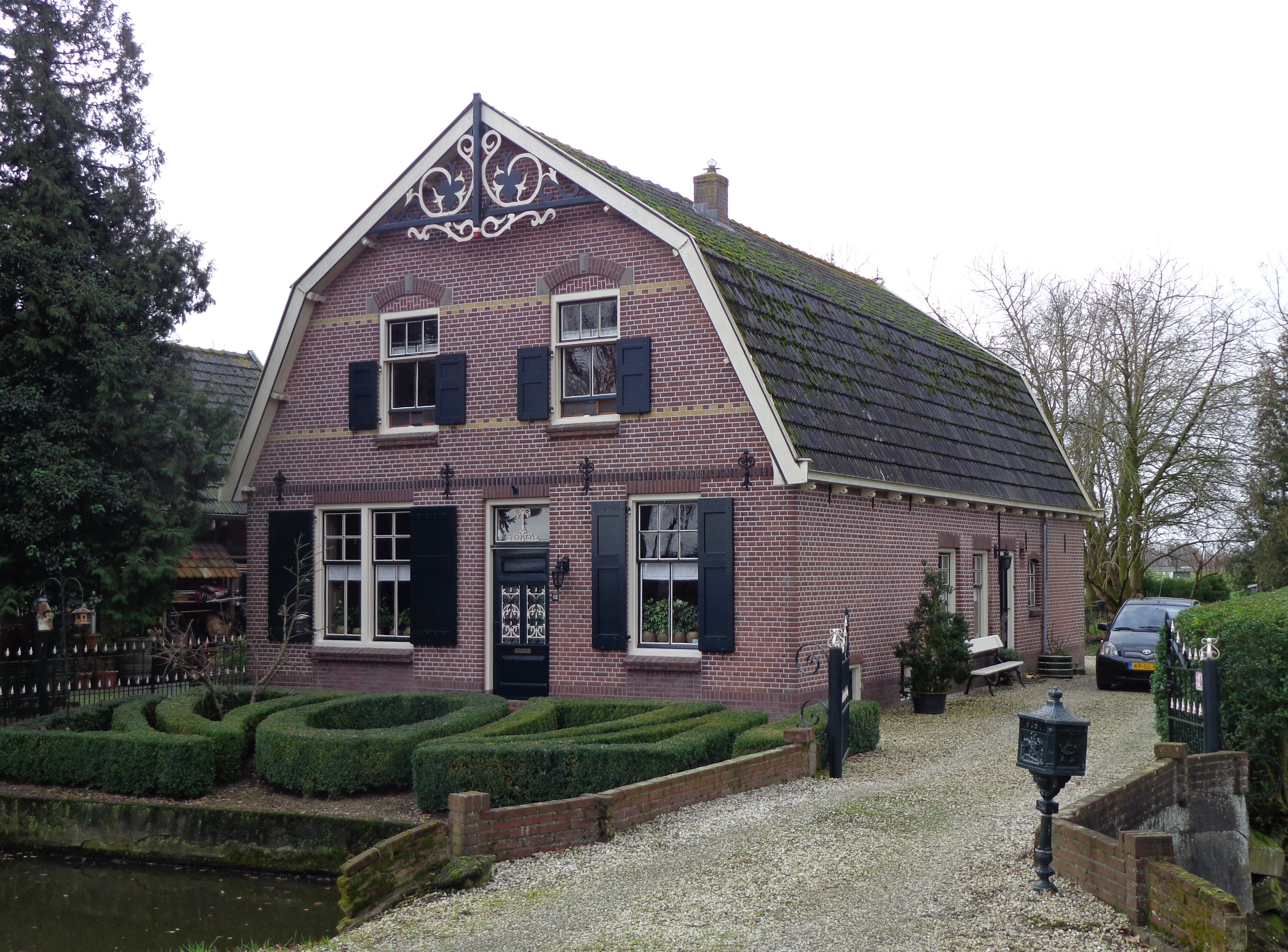
Farm in Lakerveld

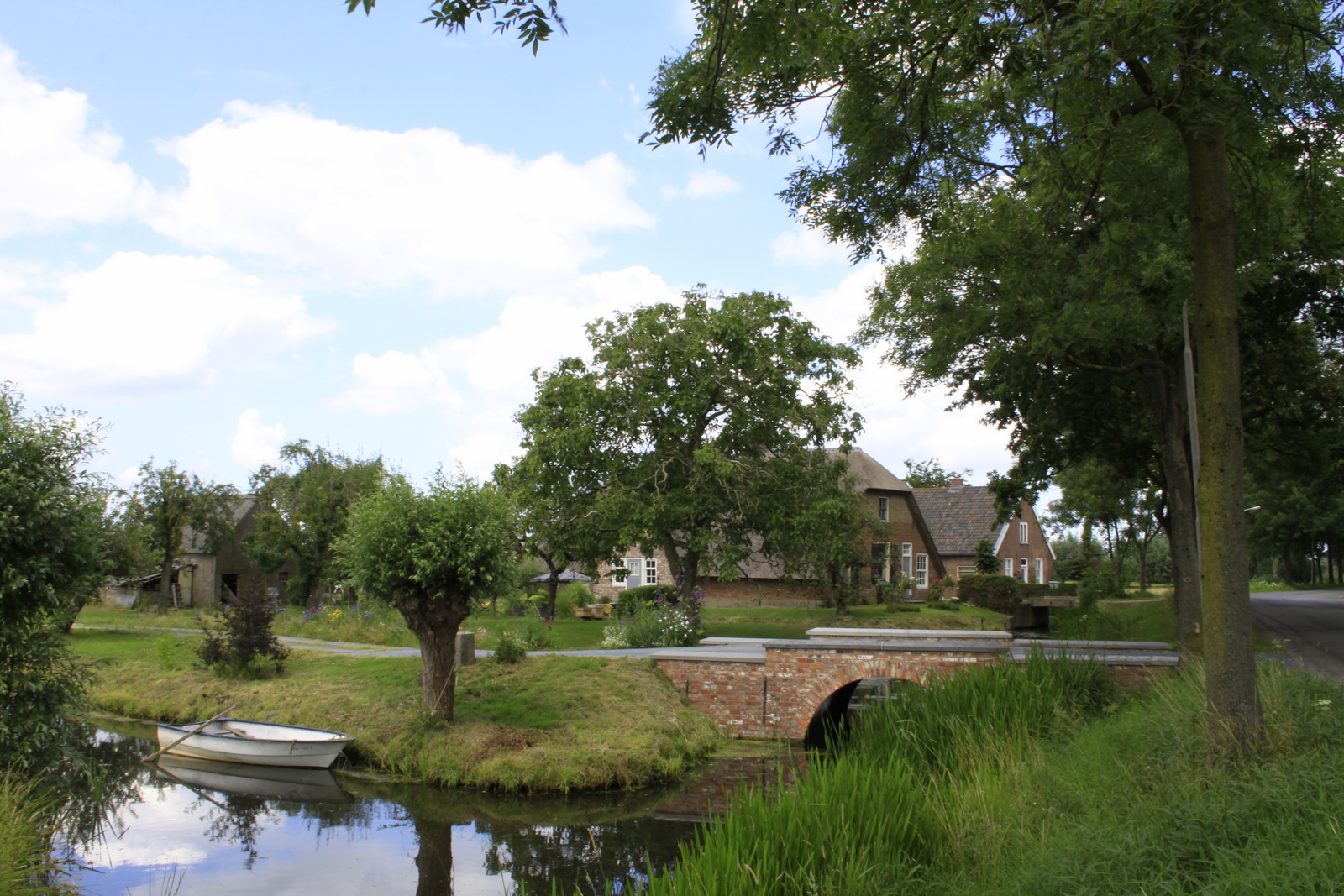
View on Lakerveld

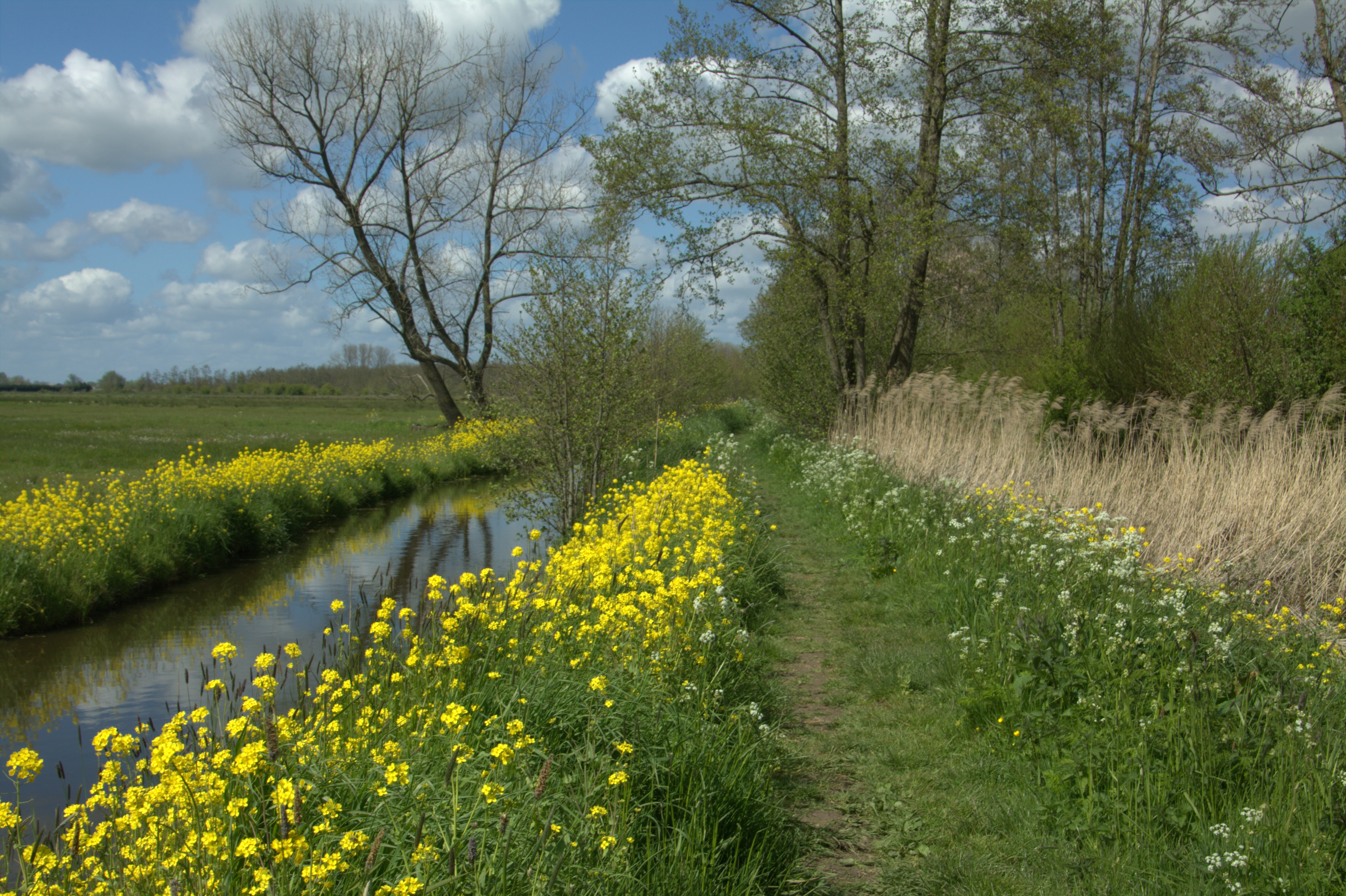
Landscape near Lakerveld
