= Braekel =

Belgian breed of chicken

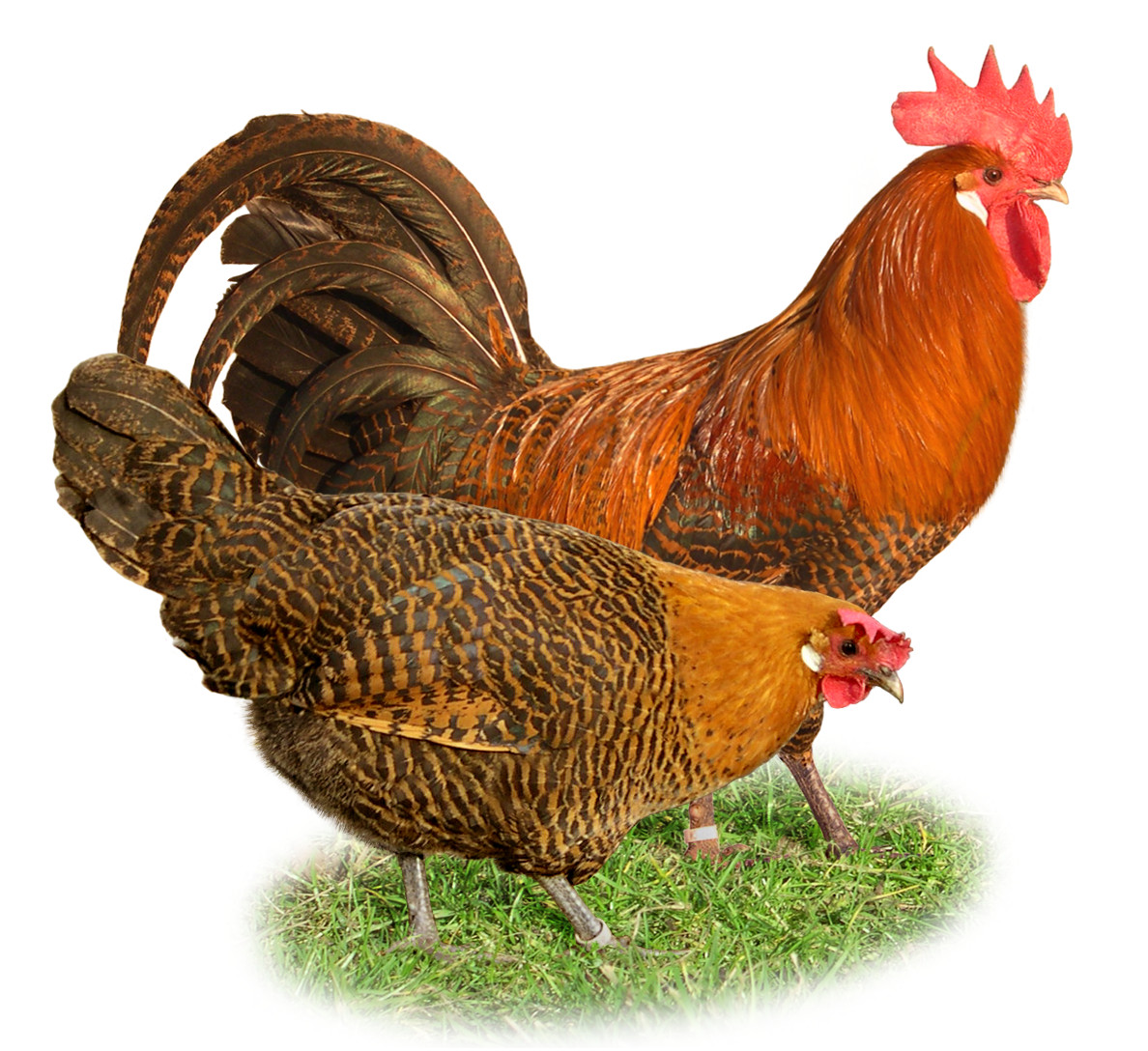
- Golden cock and hen
- Conservation status: FAO (2007): not at risk; DAD-IS (2023): at risk
- Other names: Brakel; Braeckel; Brackel
- Country of origin: Belgium
- Use: eggs

Traits
- Weight: Male: standard: 2.0–2.5 kg; bantam: 800 g; Female: standard: 1.8–2.2 kg; bantam: 700 g
- Egg colour: white

Classification
- APA: not listed
- EE: yes
- PCGB: rare soft feather: light
- Chicken; Gallus gallus domesticus

The Braekel or Brakel is a traditional Belgian breed of chicken. It is thought to have originated in the area of Brakel, in the Flemish province of East Flanders, for which it is named. There is a bantam version of the Braekel. The Campine of the United Kingdom derives from it.

== History ==
The Braekel apparently derives from same extended population of gold and silver chickens which gave rise to the closely similar Ostfriesische Möwe and Westfälischer Totleger breeds. It is thought to have originated in the area of Brakel, in the Flemish province of East Flanders, and particularly in the villages of Opbrakel and Nederbrakel; and to have spread along the valleys of the Scheldt and Dender rivers, in East Flanders and into Hainaut.

In 1884, two distinct types were recognised as separate breeds: the larger Braekel of Flanders, and a smaller and lighter type from the Campine region to the east. In 1898, a Braekel breeders' society was established in Nederbrakel, and a breed standard was published. In 1926, the separate Braekel and Campine breeds were brought together again under a single breed standard.

In the United Kingdom a very different Campine breed was created, probably through cross-breeding with pencilled Hamburgs. The principal difference is that cock birds display hen-feathering, which was not seen in the Belgian type.

The Braekel population declined during and after the Second World War and it is a rare breed. For Belgium, population numbers reported to DAD-IS were 1500 in 1994 and 125 in 2013; the local conservation status was listed in 2023 as 'unknown'. The Braekel is also reported from the United Kingdom, where in 2023 the conservation status was 'unknown', and from Germany, where in 2023 the reported population was 882 and the conservation status 'at risk'.

== Characteristics ==
The Braekel is a light breed; cocks weigh some 2–2.5 kg and hens 1.8–2.2 kg. Bantam cocks weigh about 800 g and hens about 700 g. Ring sizes are 18 mm and 16 mm for standard-sized cocks and hens, and 13 mm and 11 mm respectively for bantams.

A straight banding pattern of the feathers and a uniform solid neck colour are characteristic of the Braekel. The Entente Européenne lists ten colour variants, of which only the gold and the silver are recognised.

== Use ==
Braekel hens lay well from the age of six or seven months, and in a year may produce approximately 180 white-shelled eggs weighing 60–65 g.

== Gallery ==
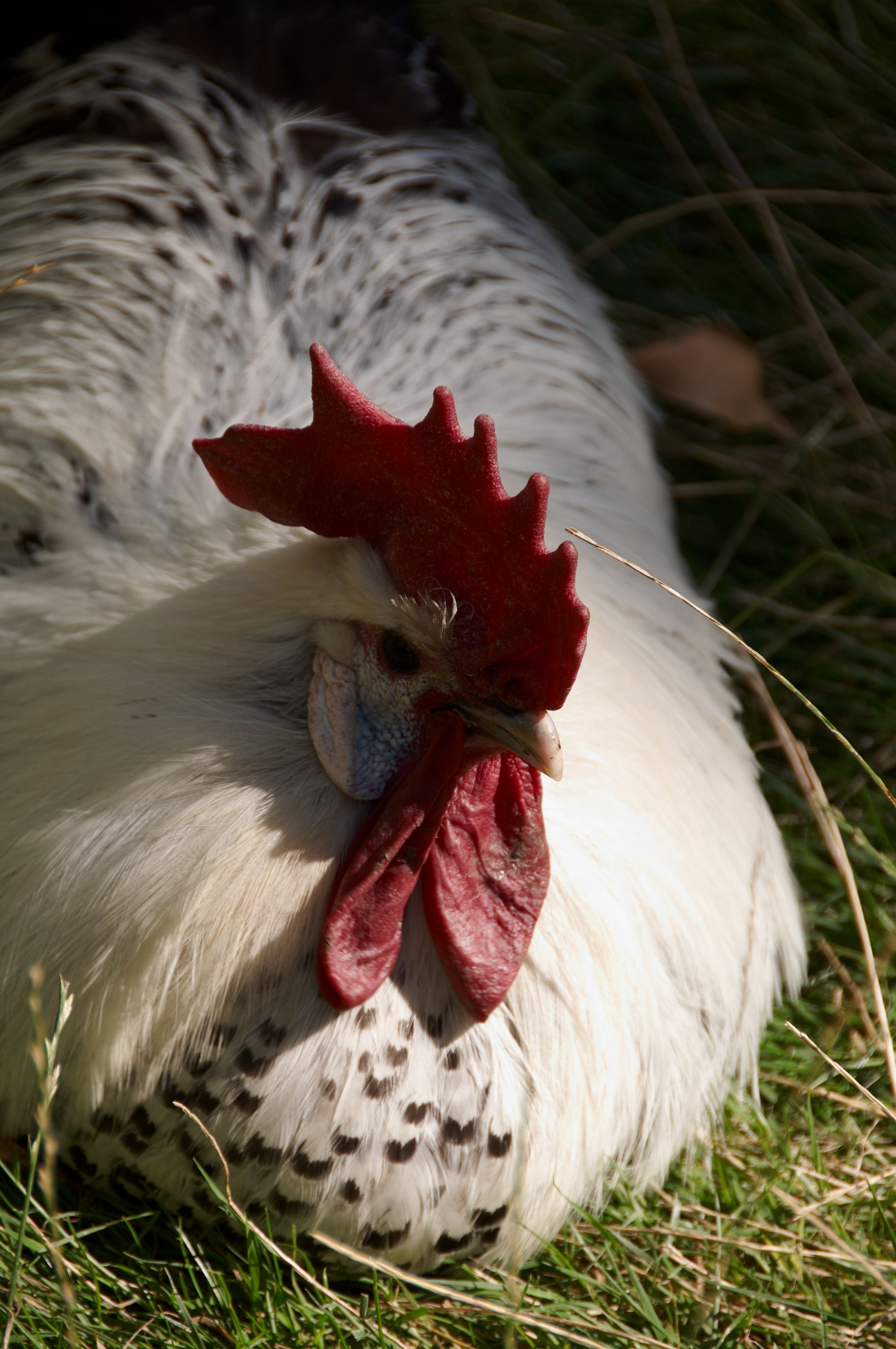
Silver cock

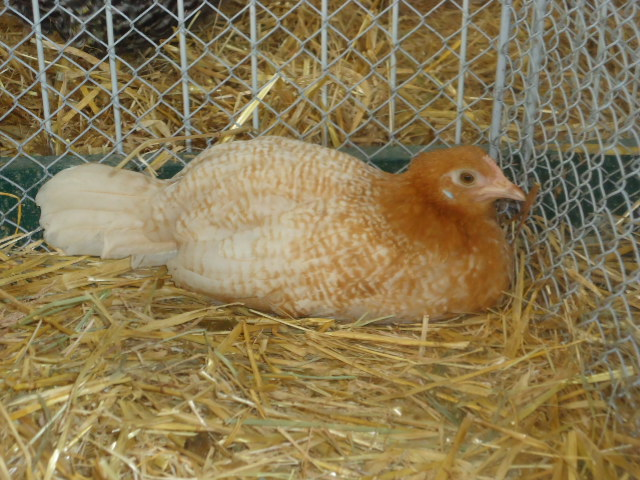
Chamois pullet

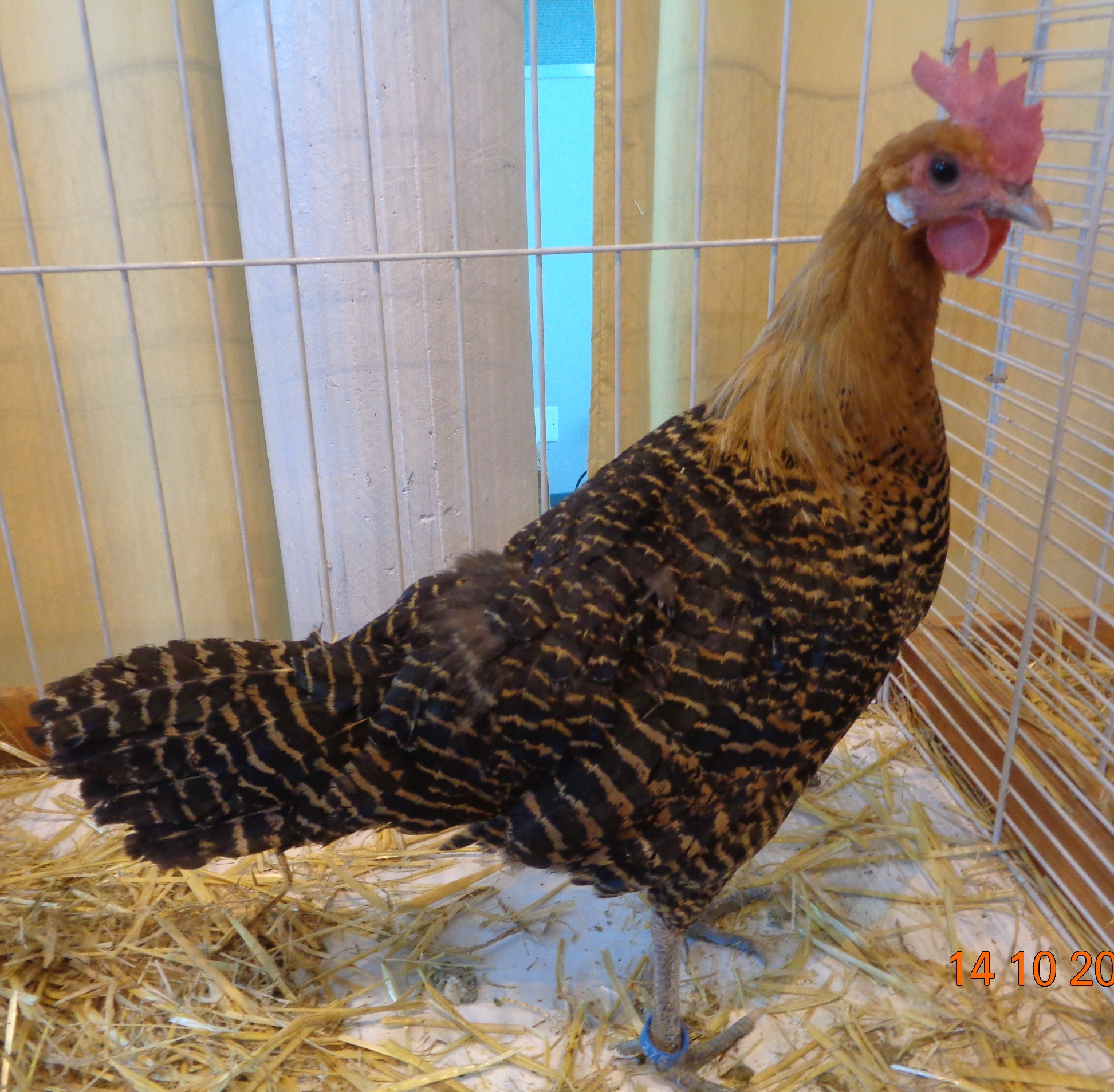
Golden hen

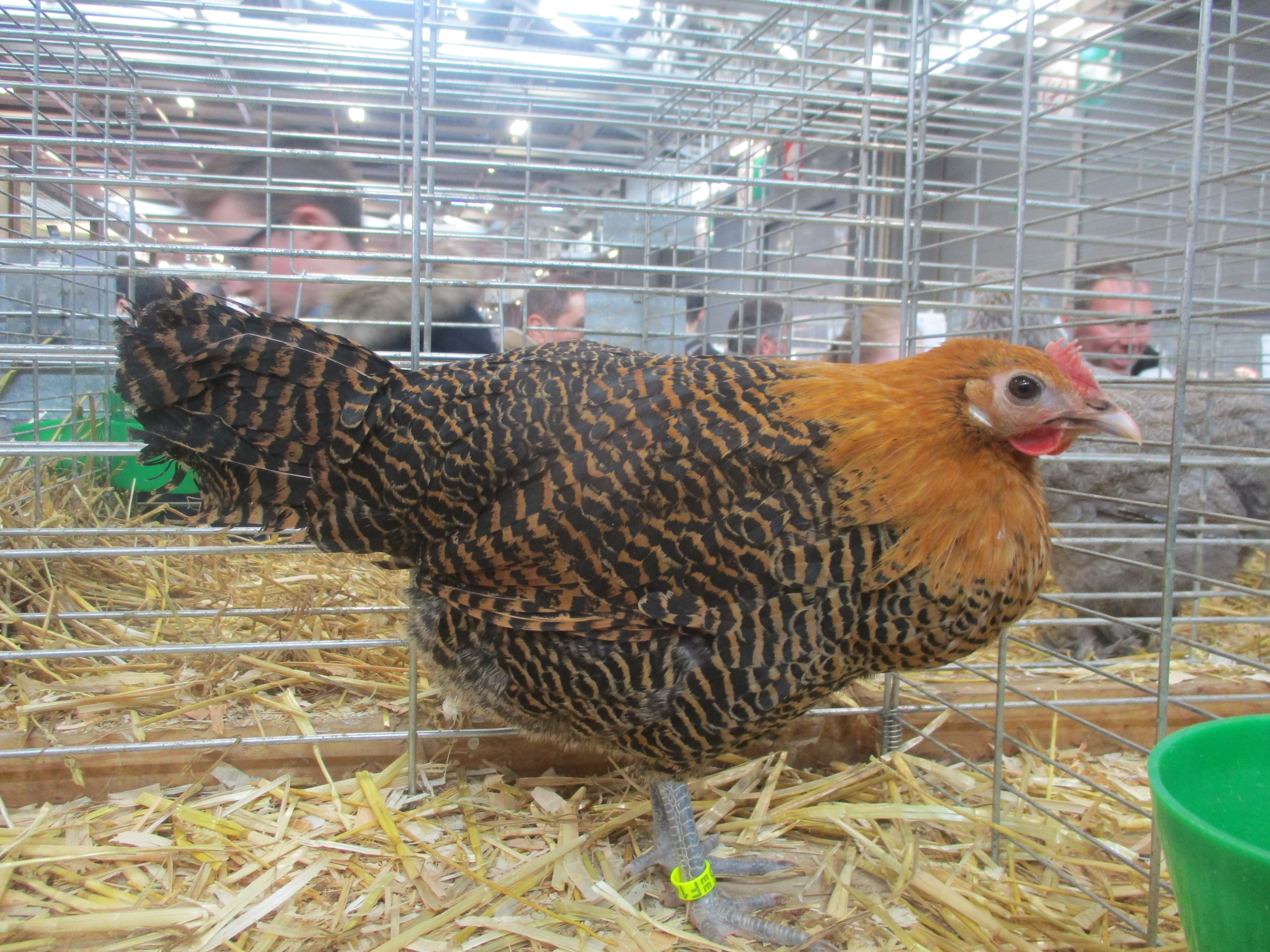
Golden bantam hen
