= Tuzo (chicken) =

German breed of bantam chicken

- Conservation status: FAO (2007): endangered; DAD-IS (2025): at risk/endangered
- Country of origin: Japan; Germany; Europe; United States

Traits
- Weight: Male: 1.3–1.5 kg; Female: 1–1.2 kg
- Egg colour: white or light brown

Classification
- APA: not recognised
- EE: yes
- PCGB: Asian hard feather, true bantam
- Chicken; Gallus gallus domesticus

The Tuzo is a German breed of true bantam chicken of gamecock type. It derives from birds of Asian origin and was developed partly in Europe and partly in the United States.

== History ==
The Tuzo derives from birds of Asian origin. It may have been a Japanese breed or type: a detailed description is given in an account of cock-fighting in Japan written in 1929; it is not a recognised breed in modern Japan. Later breeding took place partly in Europe and partly in the United States. The breed was recognised in Germany in 1983, and in the twenty-first century is recognised also by the Entente Européenne and by the Poultry Club of Great Britain – which classifies it as an Asian hard feather breed – but not by the American Poultry Association.

== Characteristics ==
The Entente Européenne recognises five colour variants – black, black mottled, blue, wheaten and white – and also lists the black-red. The Poultry Club of Great Britain recognises three colours: black, blue and white.

== Use ==
The Tuzo was bred for cock-fighting. Standards are published for birds intended for showing. Hens lay about 80 white or light brown eggs per year, with an average weight of about 35 g.
