= Ramelsloher =

German breed of chicken

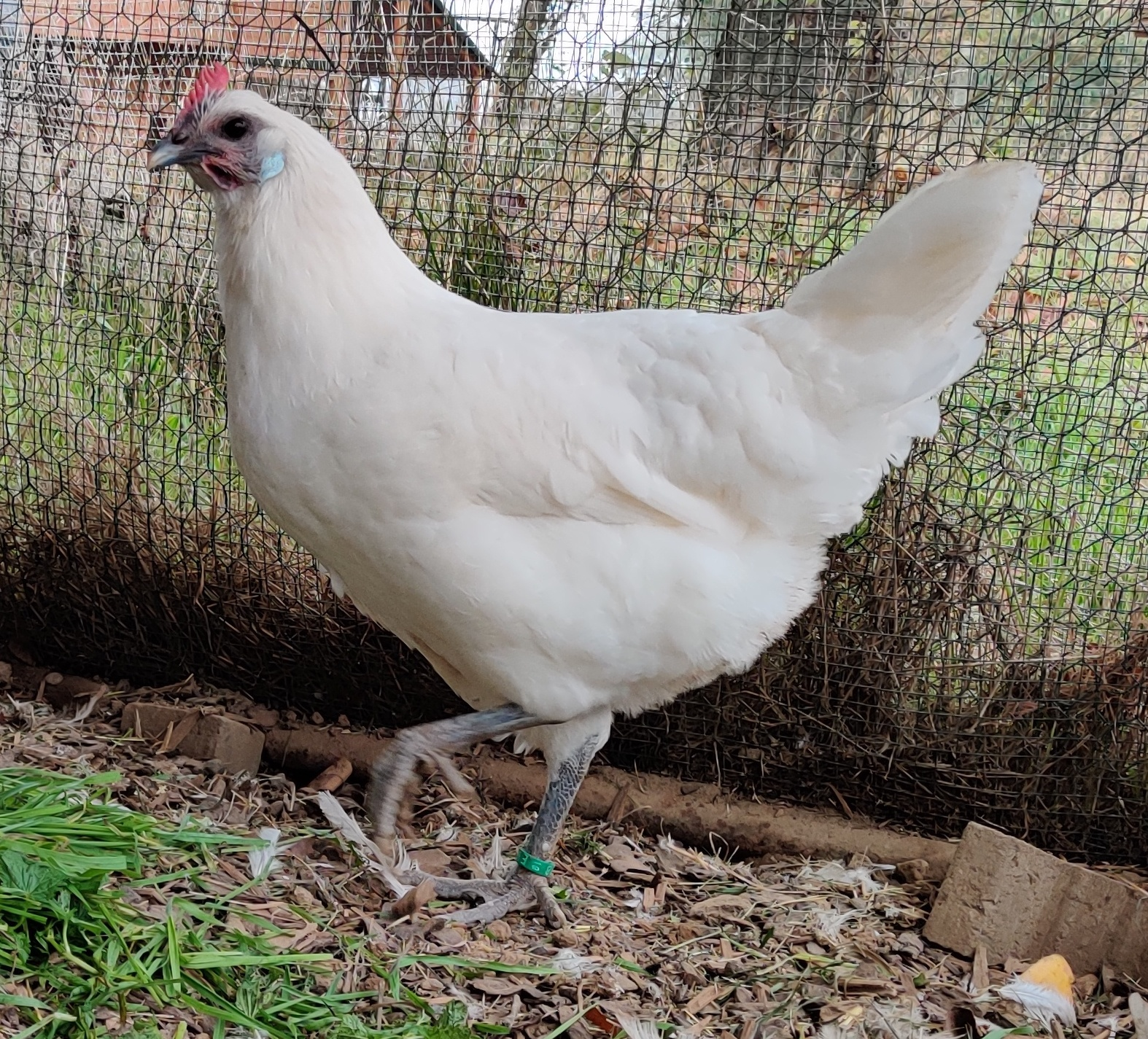
- A hen

- Buff cocks
- Conservation status: FAO (2007): endangered; GEH (2024): extremely endangered; DAD-IS (2024): at risk/endangered
- Other names: Ramelsloher Blaubein
- Country of origin: Germany
- Distribution: nation-wide
- Use: dual-purpose, eggs and meat

Traits
- Weight: Male: 2.5–3.0 kg; Female: 2.0–2.5 kg
- Egg colour: white or light cream
- Comb type: single

Classification
- APA: not recognised
- EE: yes
- PCGB: not recognised
- Chicken; Gallus gallus domesticus

The Ramelsloher (German pronunciation: [ˈʁaːml̩sˌloːɐ]) is a German breed of dual-purpose chicken. It was bred in the 1870s by A.D. Wichmann, a Hamburg shipowner, and is named for the village of Ramelsloh, which lies some thirty kilometres south of Hamburg. In the early twentieth century it was an important utility chicken; in the twenty-first century it is an endangered breed. It is recognised in only two colours, white and buff; there is no bantam Ramelsloher.

== History ==
The Ramelsloher is named for the village of Ramelsloh, which lies some thirty kilometres south of Hamburg, in the landkreis of Harburg, in Lower Saxony in north-western Germany. It was bred there in the 1870s by A.D. Wichmann, a Hamburg shipowner, who selected white birds from the heterogeneous population of local farm chickens of the area and cross-bred them with Andalusian, Cochin and Spanish stock to produce a pure white chicken with slate-blue legs. The birds were first exhibited in Hamburg in 1874. A buff colour variant was later developed, but did not become as widespread as the white. It died out in the 1970s, but was re-created from about 1985 using Thüringer Barthuhn and Italiener (German Leghorn) blood.

In the early twentieth century it was an important commercial chicken, and became widespread through much of Germany. As with many other traditional dual-purpose breeds, numbers declined rapidly after the Second World War for reasons including the effects of the war itself, the advent of specialised single-purpose layer and meat breeds, and the industrialisation of chicken farming from the 1960s. A low point was reached in the 1970s and early 1980s, but numbers later recovered slightly.

In the twenty-first century it is an endangered breed: its conservation status is listed as "at risk/endangered" in DAD-IS, as stark gefährdet, 'seriously endangered', by the Bundesanstalt für Landwirtschaft und Ernährung, and as Category I, extrem gefährdet, 'extremely endangered', by the Gesellschaft zur Erhaltung alter und gefährdeter Haustierrassen. It is included in the Ark of Taste of the international Slow Food Foundation.

== Characteristics ==
The Ramelsloher is recognised in two colours only, the white and the buff. It has a number of unusual features: the earlobes are bluish or blue, particularly in hens; the beak is bluish with a pale tip; and the legs and feet are slate-blue with white claws. The eyelids are black and the eyes are so dark as to appear black also, a characteristic not seen in any other breed of chicken. The comb is single and red.

Weights are 2.0–2.5 kg for hens and 2.5–3.0 kg for cocks, and ring sizes are 18 mm and 20 mm respectively.

There is no bantam Ramelsloher.

== Use ==
Hens lay about 170 white or light cream-coloured eggs per year; the eggs range from 50 to well over 60 g in weight, with an average of 56 g.

Cock and hen, illustration by Hugo Spindler from Bruno Dürigen, Die Geflugelzucht, nach ihrem jetzigen rationellen Standpunkt, 1886

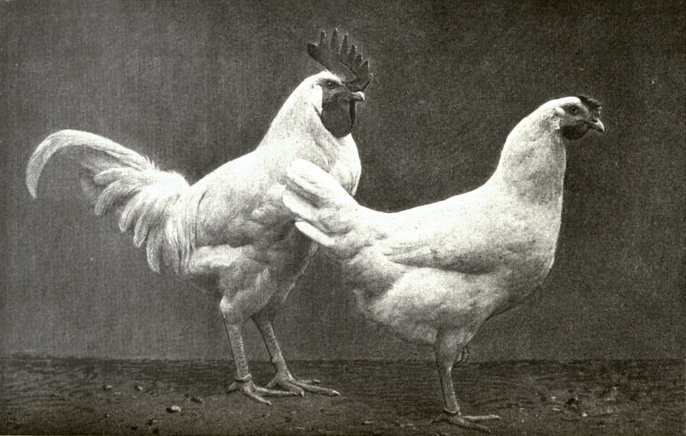
Cock and hen, illustration by August Weber Althaldensleben from Theodor Huperz, Die Geflügelzucht, 1921

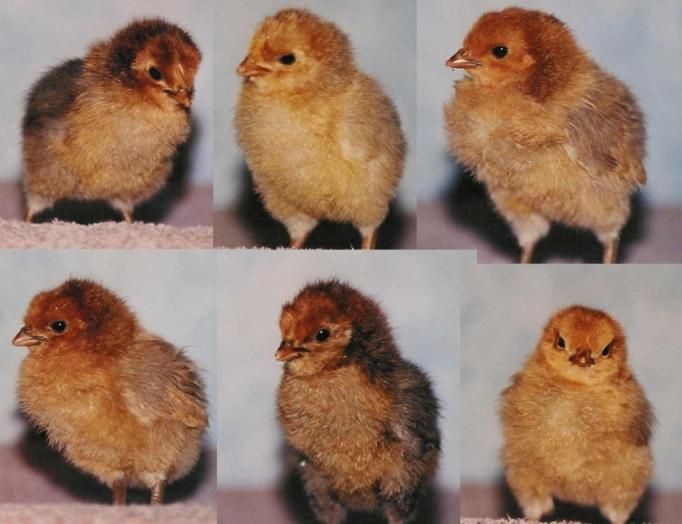
Chicks
