= Westfälischer Totleger =

German breed of domestic chicken

Westfälische Totleger
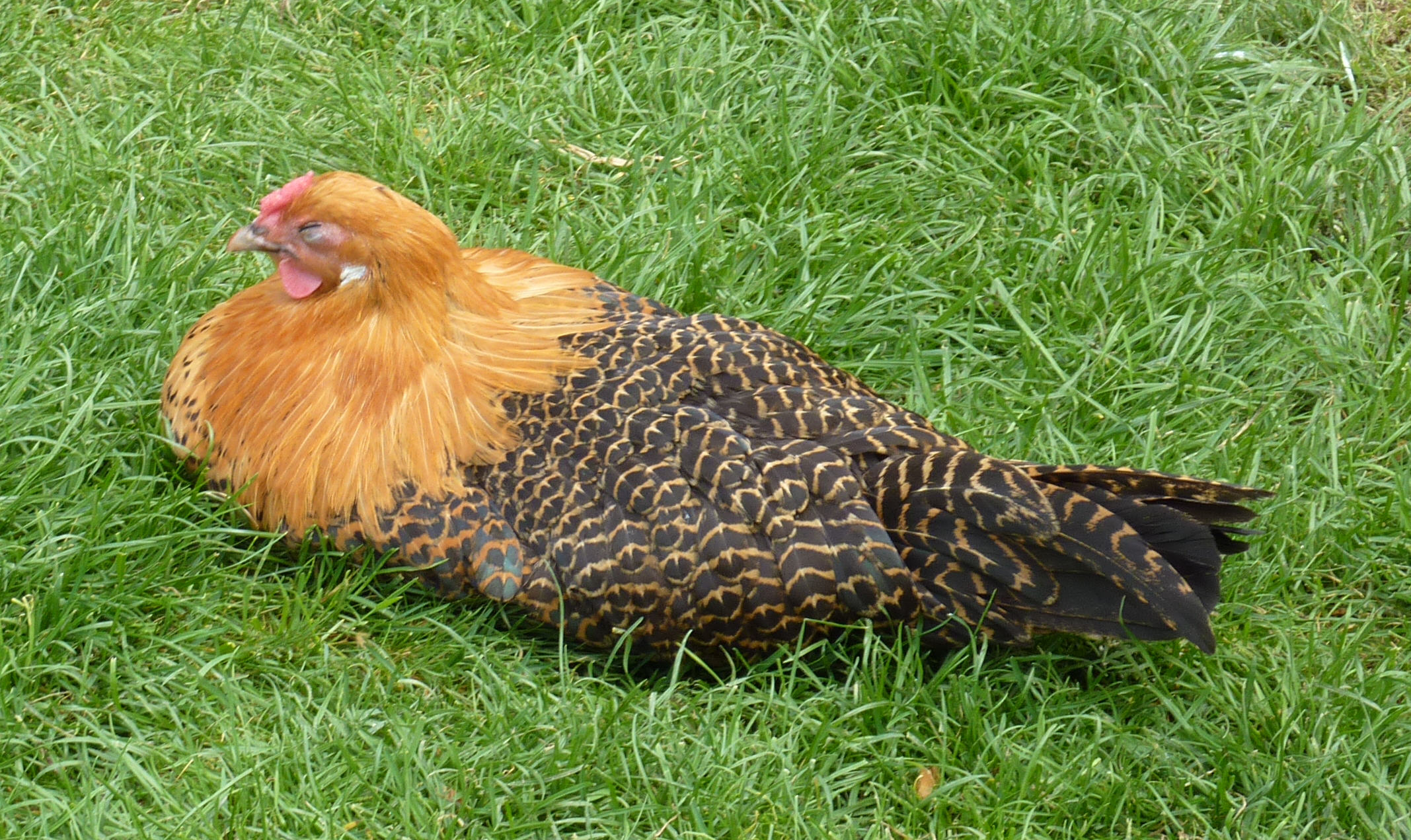
- Gold-pencilled hen
- Country of origin: Germany

Traits
- Weight: Male: 2–2.5 kg; Female: 1.5–2 kg
- Egg colour: white
- Comb type: rose comb

Classification
- Chicken; Gallus gallus domesticus

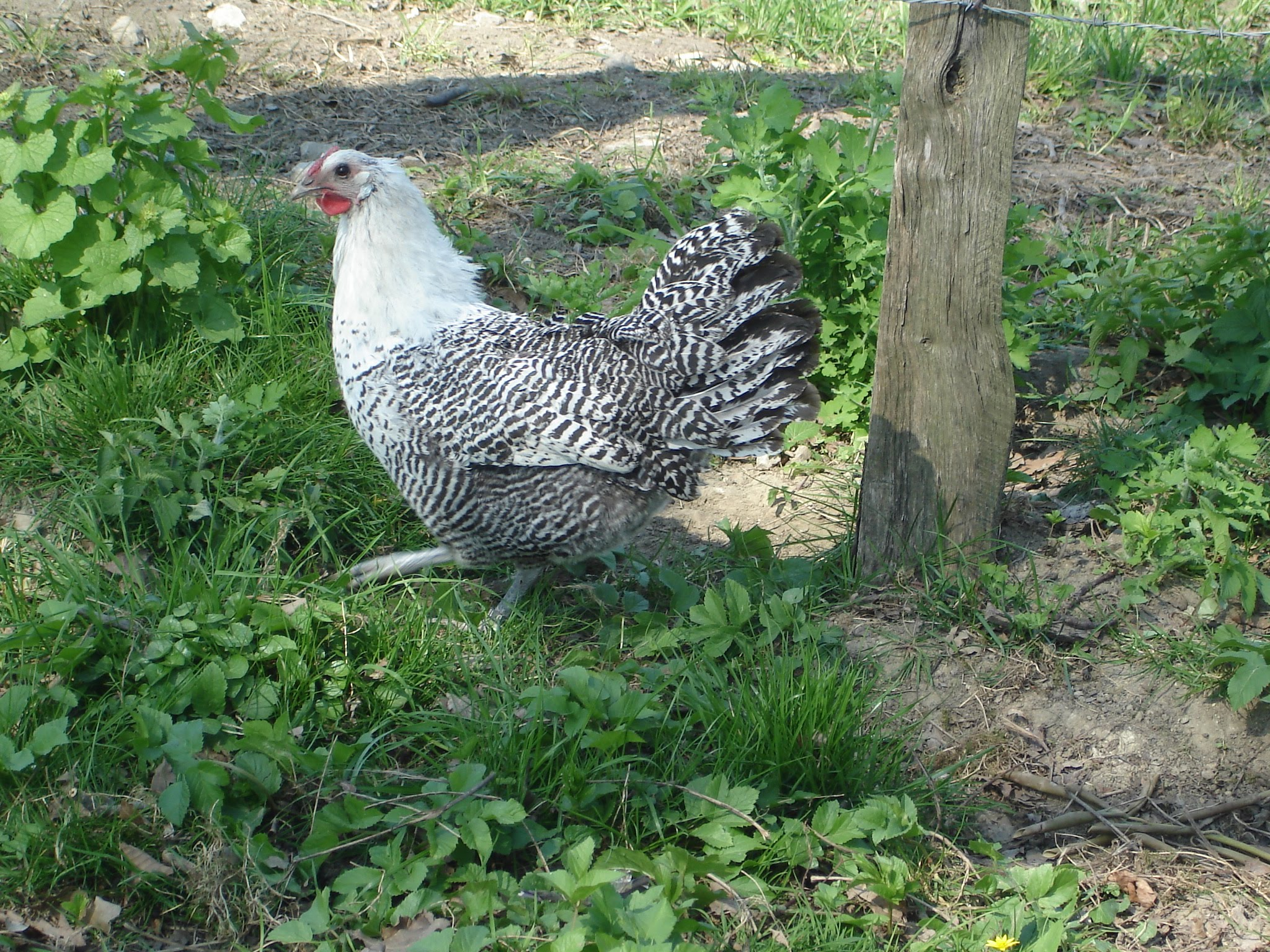
The silver-pencilled

The Westfälischer Totleger (German pronunciation: [vɛstˌfɛːlɪʃɐ ˈtoːtˌleːɡɐ]) is a German breed of domestic chicken. It is more than 400 years old, and is a rare breed.

== History ==
The Totleger derives from the traditional rural chickens of Westphalia, and was reared mainly in the area of the cities of Bielefeld and Herford. It is closely related to the Ostfriesische Möwe and to the Braekel.

Although the German word Tot means 'dead' and Leger means 'layer' (of eggs), this is not the derivation of the name of the breed. The chickens were formerly known as 'Alltagsleger' or 'Dauerleger', meaning a daily or long-lasting layer of eggs. Under the influence of Low German the name evolved into 'Daudtleijer', and later became 'Totleger'.

The Totleger was widespread until the arrival of more productive foreign breeds in the 1880s. By the time a breeders' association was formed in 1904, it had become largely an exhibition breed. Numbers remained low throughout the twentieth century, reaching a low point in the 1980s.

In 2013 the recorded population consisted of 301 cocks and 1353 hens; in 2016 it had fallen to 176 cocks and 798 hens, in the hands of 112 breeders. It was the "endangered breed of the year" of the Gesellschaft zur Erhaltung alter und gefährdeter Haustierrassen in 1994, and in 2016 was classified as Stark gefährdet, 'gravely endangered'.

== Characteristics ==
The Totleger is kept in two colours: gold-pencilled and silver-pencilled. Cock birds weigh 2–2.5 kg and hens 1.5–2 kg. The hens are non-sitters; they lay some 180 eggs per year, of about 50–65 g in weight. Ring size is 16 mm for hens and 18 mm for cocks.
