= Ostfriesische Möwe =

Breed of chicken

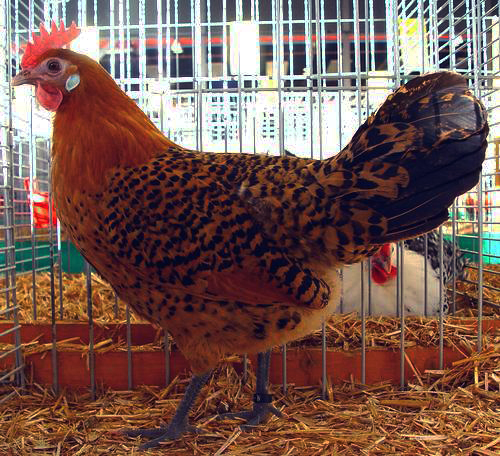
- Gold hen
- Country of origin: Germany

Traits
- Weight: Male: 2.25–3 kg; Female: 1.75–2.5 kg
- Egg colour: white

Classification
- Chicken; Gallus gallus domesticus

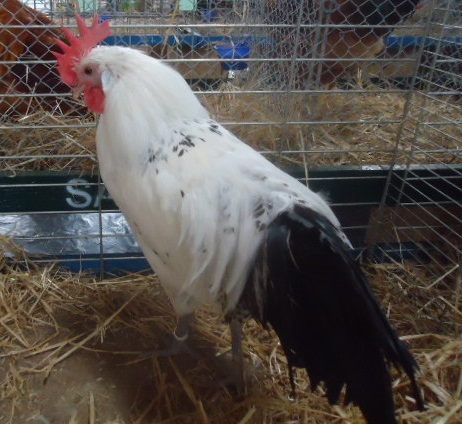
Silver cock

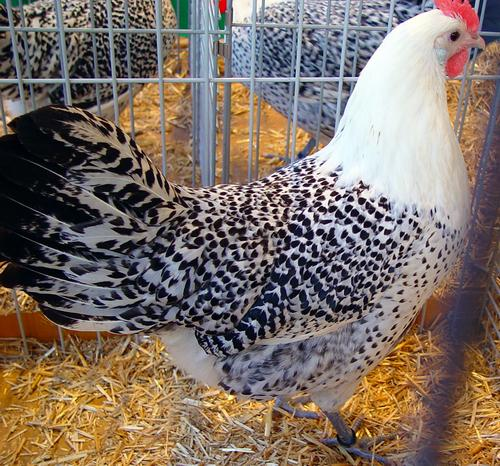
Silver hen

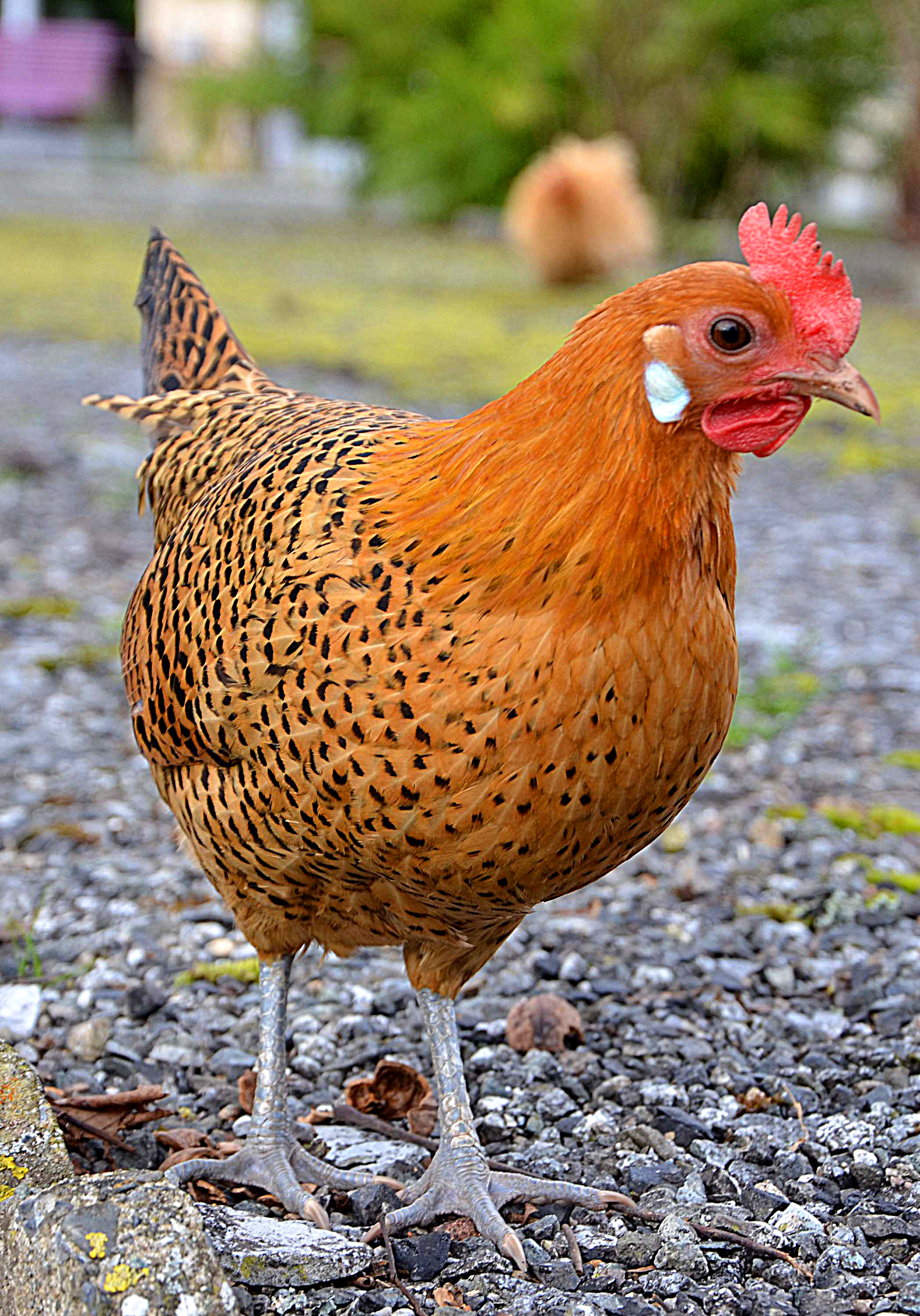
Gold bantam hen

The Ostfriesische Möwe (German pronunciation: [ˈɔstˌfʁiːzɪʃə ˈmøːvə], lit. 'East Frisian Gull') is an old German breed of domestic chicken. It is a rare breed: in 2016 the recorded population in Germany consisted of 215 cocks and 979 hens, in the hands of 130 breeders. Its conservation status is gefährdet, "endangered".

== History ==
The Möwe derives from the traditional rural chickens of north-western Germany and north-eastern Holland, in East Friesland and West Friesland respectively. It is closely related to the Westfälische Totleger and the Braekel.

== Characteristics ==
It is kept in two colour varieties: silver-pencilled and gold-pencilled. Cocks weigh up to 3 kg and hens up to 2.5 kg. Hens lay about 170 eggs per year, averaging 55 g in weight.
