= North Holland Blue =

Dutch breed of chicken

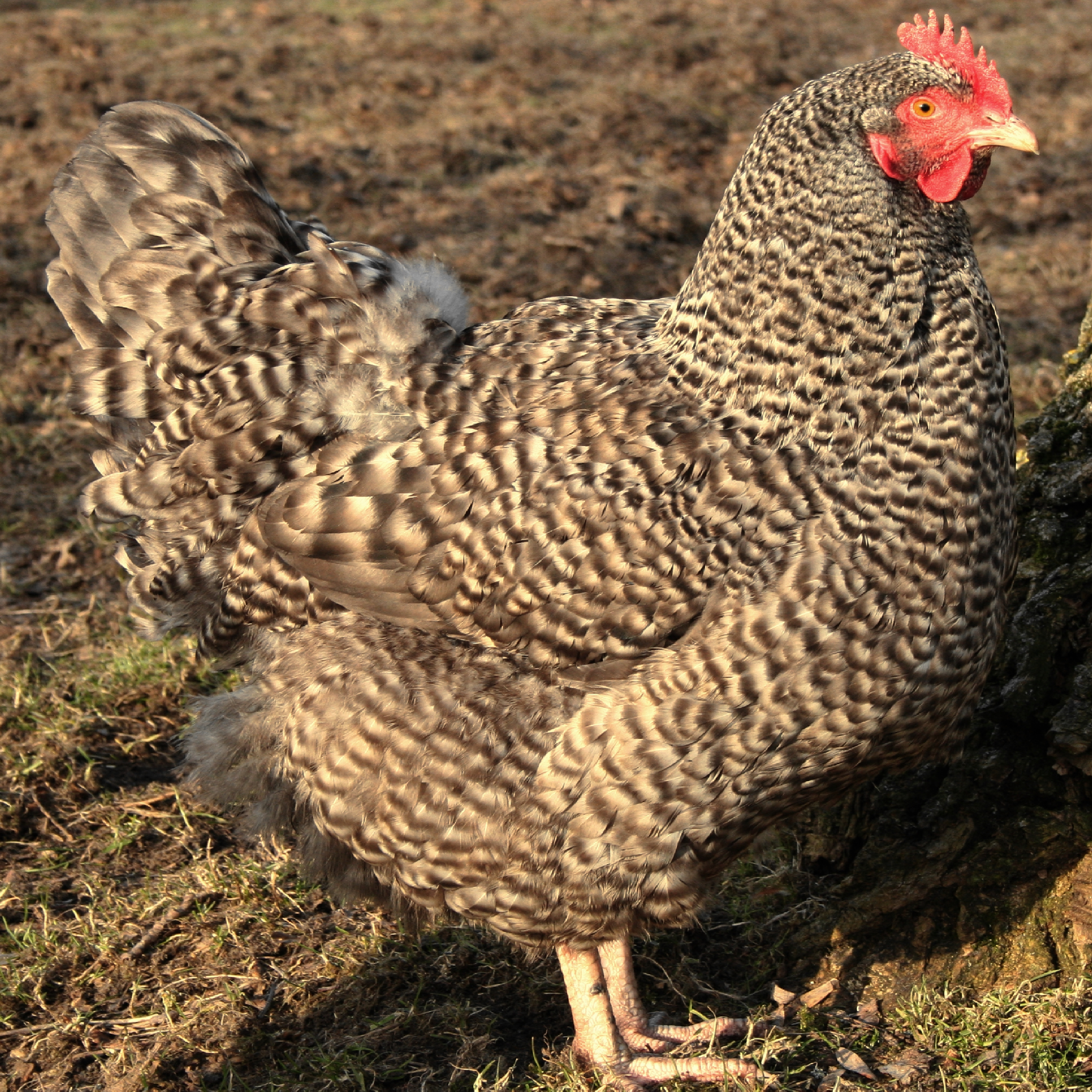
- North Holland hen
- Other names: Dutch: Noord-Hollandse Blauwe; Dutch: Noord-Hollandse Hoen
- Country of origin: Netherlands
- Standard: NHDB (Holland, in Dutch); NHDB, bantam
- Use: meat

Traits
- Weight: Male: Standard: 3.5–4.0 kg Bantam: 1000 g; Female: Standard: 2.75–3.25 kg Bantam: 900 g
- Comb type: single

Classification
- PCGB: rare soft feather: heavy
- Chicken; Gallus gallus domesticus

The North Holland Blue, Dutch: Noord-Hollandse Blauwe or Noord-Hollandse Hoen, is a Dutch breed of domestic chicken originating in the province of North Holland. It is a heavy meat breed, and was created to supply the high demand for white chicken meat from the city of Amsterdam, particularly from the Jewish community in that city.

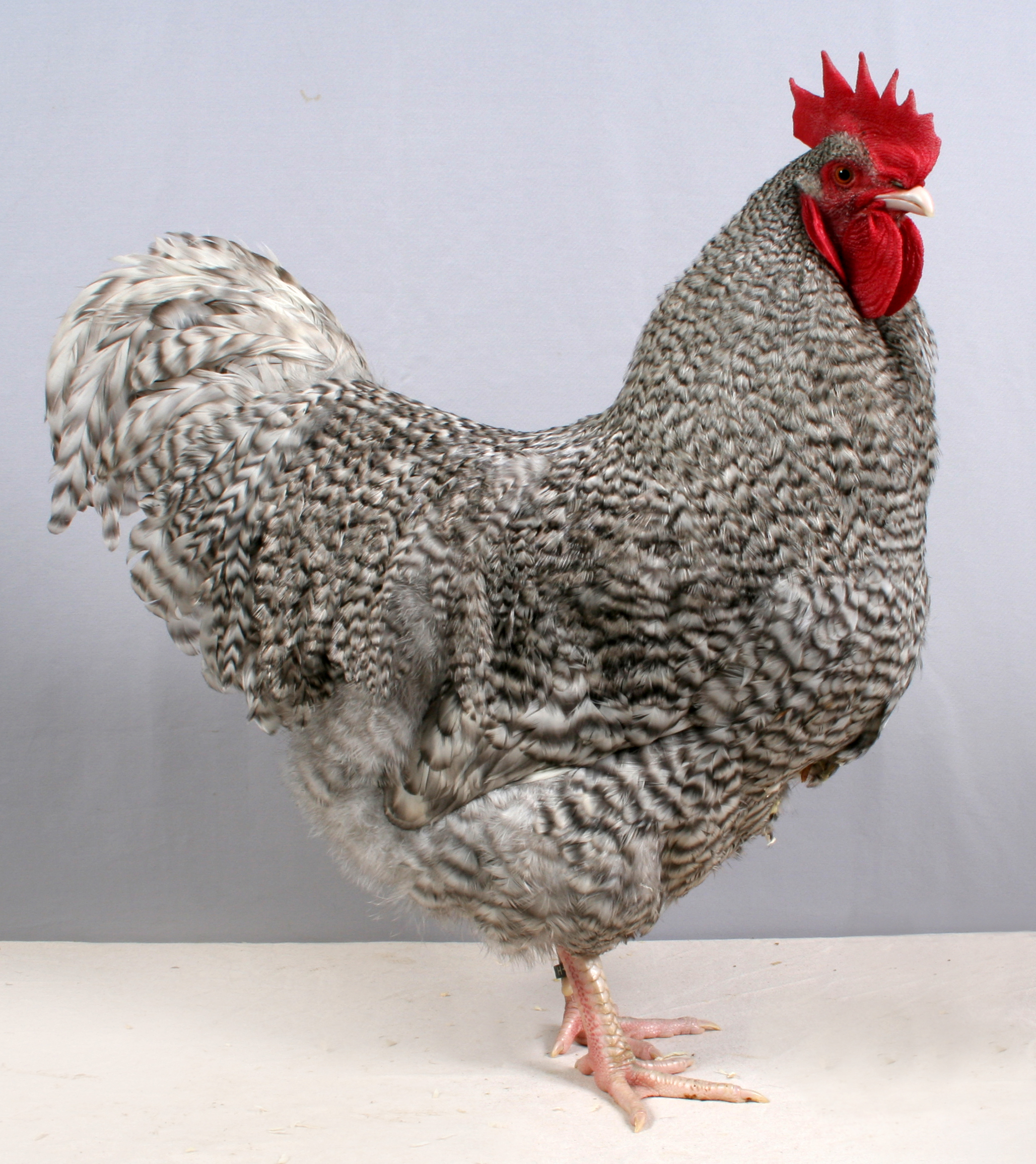
North Holland cock

== History ==
The North Holland Blue was created in the area around Purmerend in about 1900 to supply the city of Amsterdam with white chicken-meat. It derives from the Belgian Malines. Malines birds had been imported for the purpose but did not do well in the poor conditions of North Holland. They were therefore crossed with local chickens.

A breed standard was agreed in 1934 by the Noord-Hollandse Blauwenclub van Nederland, a breeders' association, and in 1950 was adopted with minor changes by the Nederlandse Hoender en Dwerghoender Bond, the national association of poultry breeders.

In the years after the Second World War the North Holland Blue was supplanted as a commercial meat breed by faster-growing imported American breeds. The last large North Holland Blue farm closed in 1977.

A bantam version was also created in the Netherlands, but was first shown in Germany. The North Holland Blue is recognised in eight European countries.

== Characteristics ==
The North Holland Blue has only one colour, Cuckoo. It has a quiet, docile temperament, and lays 180–240 eggs per year. In the Netherlands and New Zealand it is clean-legged; British breed standards call for lightly feathered legs.
