= Animal breeds originating in the Czech Republic =

This is a list of animal breeds originating in the Czech Republic.

== Chicken breeds ==
- Czech Gold Brindled Hen
- Šumavanka

== Goose breeds ==
- Czech goose (Česká husa)
- Česká chocholatá husa

== Pigeon breeds ==
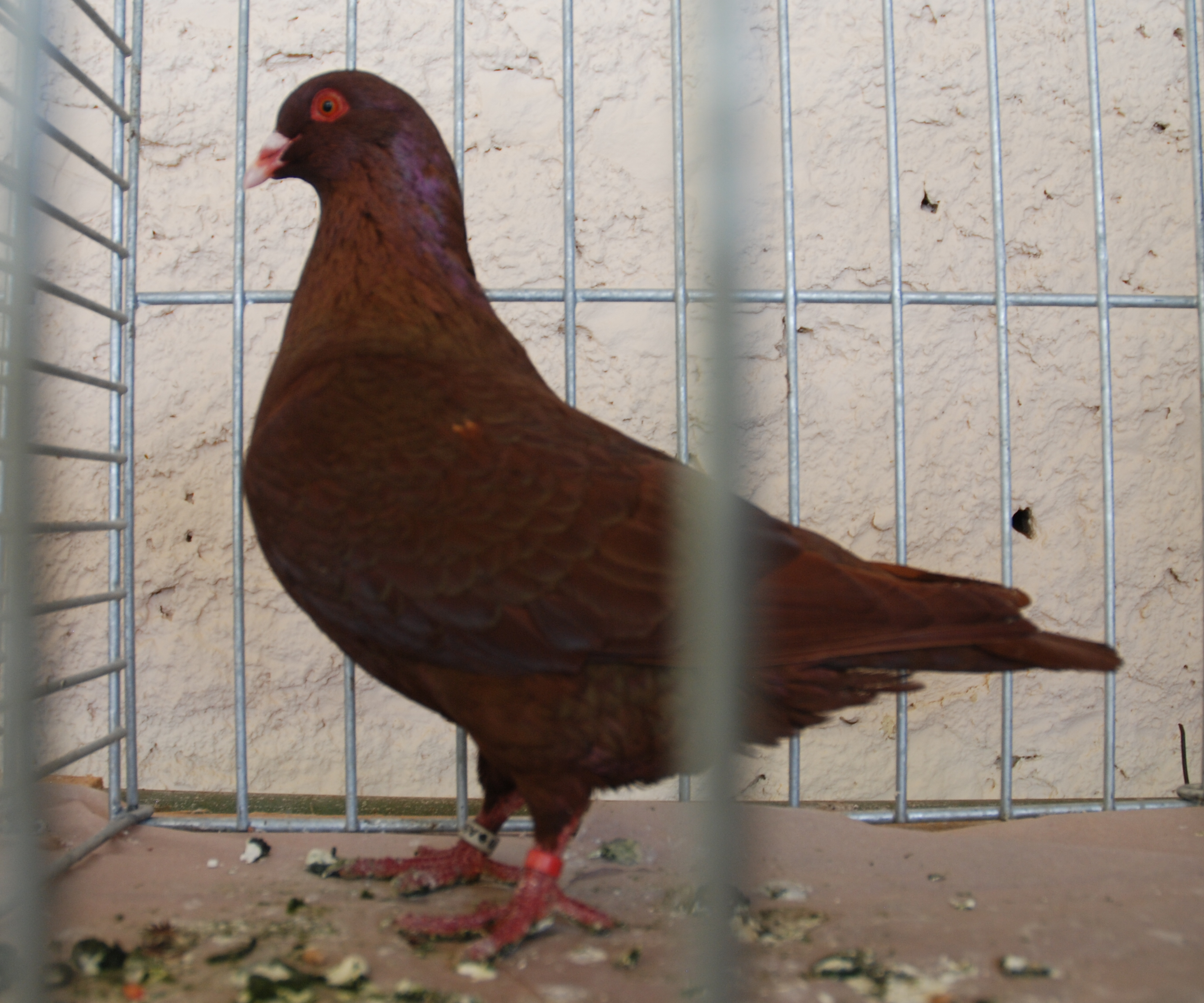
Benešovský holub

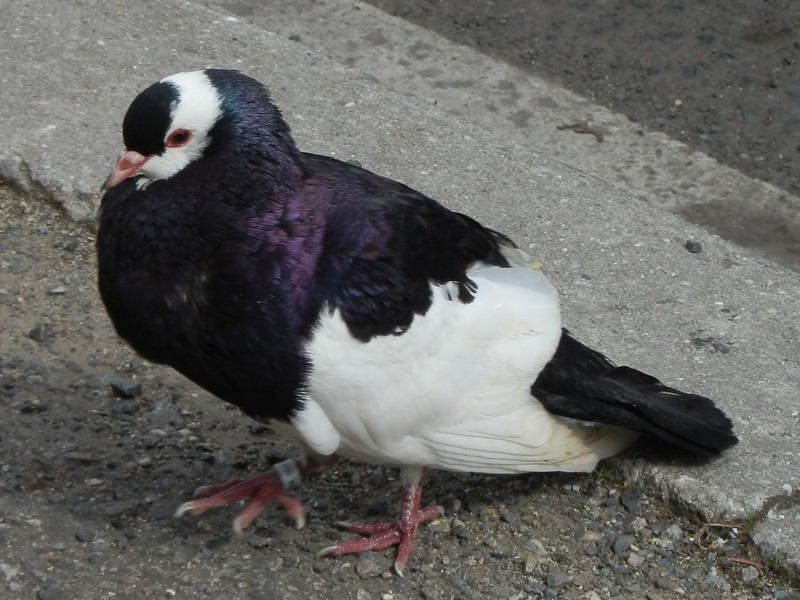
Český stavák

List:

- Benesov Pigeon (Benešovský holub)
- Brunner Pouter (Brněnský voláč)
- Česká bagdeta
- Bohemian Fairy Swallow pigeon (Česká čejka)
- Česká lyska běloocasá
- Český bublák
- Český holub
- Český rejdič
- Český stavák
- Český voláč sivý
- Hanácký voláč
- Moravská bagdeta
- Moravský bělohlávek
- Moravský morák
- Moravský pštros
- Moravský voláč sedlatý
- Ostravská bagdeta
- Prácheňský káník
- Pražský rejdič krátkozobý
- Pražský rejdič středozobý
- Rakovnický kotrlák
- Slezský barevnohlávek
- Slezský voláč

== Rabbit breeds ==
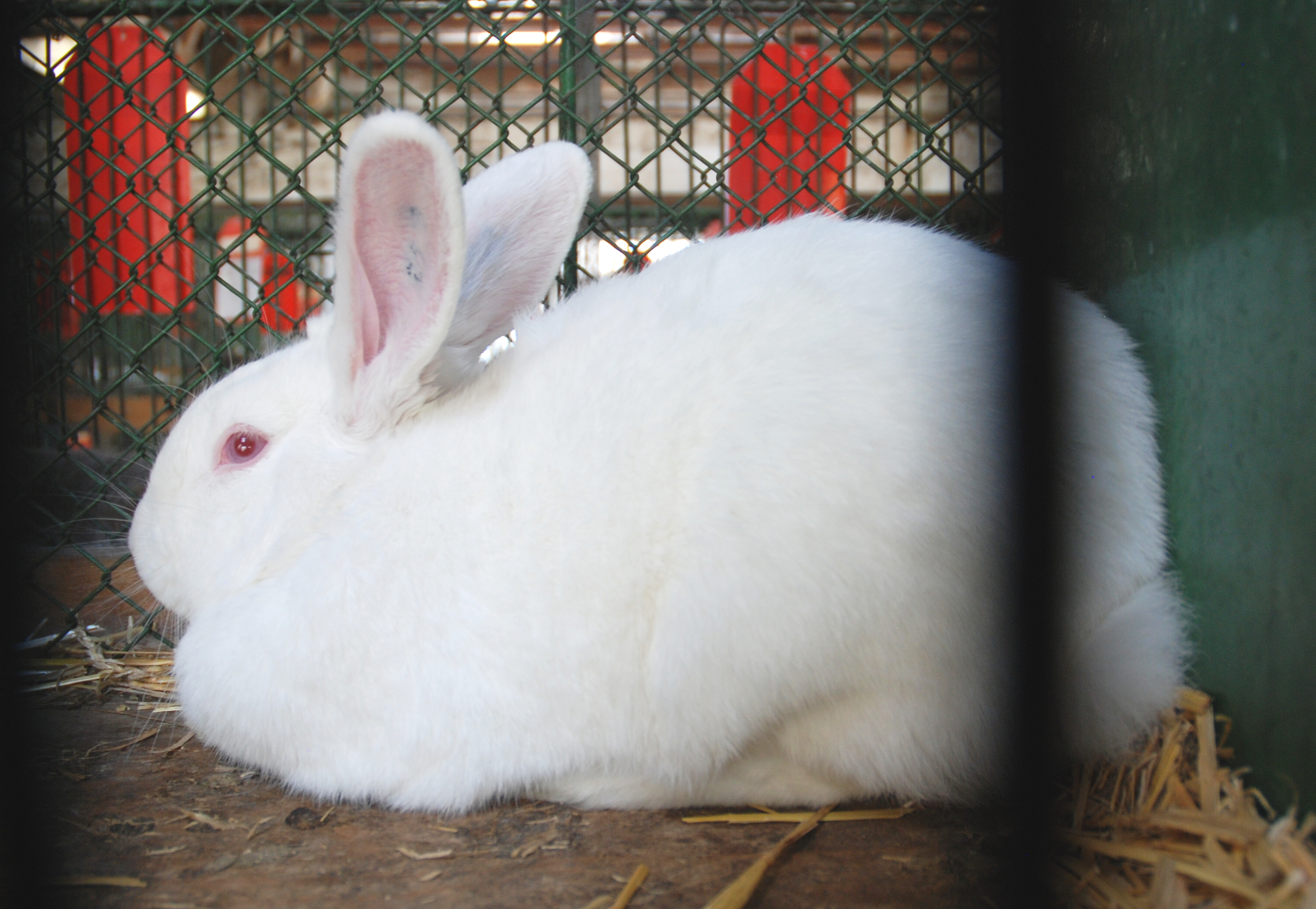
Český albín

- Czech Albino rabbit
- Czech Red rabbit
- Český černopesíkatý
- Český luštič
- Český strakáč
- Moravský bílý hnědooký
- Moravský modrý

== Nutria breeds ==
List:

- Český typ standardní nutrie
- Moravská stříbrná nutrie
- Přeštická nutrie

== Cattle breads ==
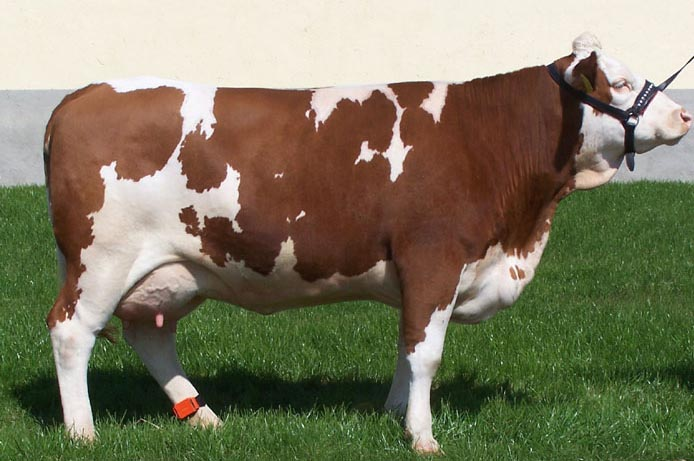
Český strakatý skot

- Česká červinka
- Český strakatý skot
- Kravařský skot (extinct)

== Pig breeds ==
- Bílé otcovské prase
- Česká landrase
- České bílé ušlechtilé prase
- České výrazně masné prase
- Přeštické černostrakaté prase

== Sheep breeds ==
- Šumavská ovce
- Valašská ovce

== Goat breeds ==
- Bílá (bezrohá) krátkosrstá koza
- Hnědá (bezrohá) krátkosrstá koza

== Horse breeds ==
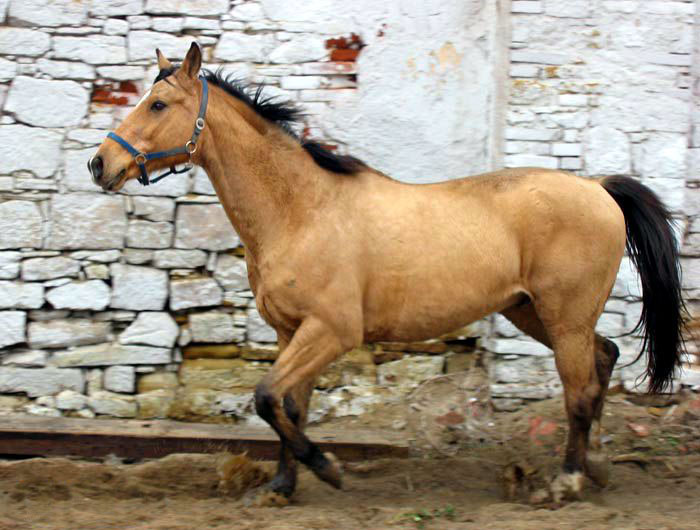
Kůň Kinský

- Czech Warmblood (Český teplokrevník)
- Moravský teplokrevník
- Českomoravský belgik
- Kladruber (Starokladrubský kůň)
- Slezský norik
- Kinsky horse (Kůň Kinský)

== Dog breeds ==
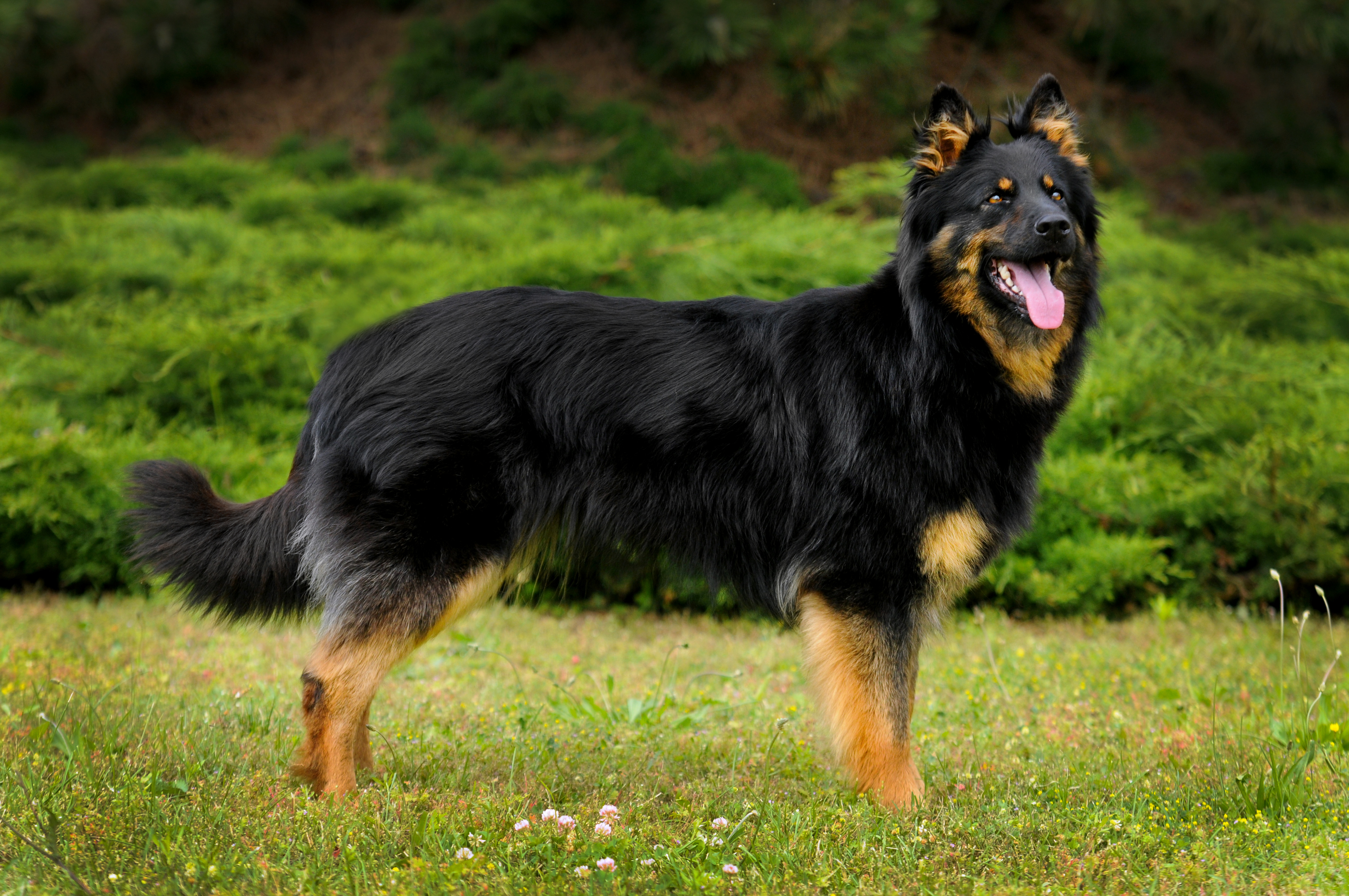
Chodský pes

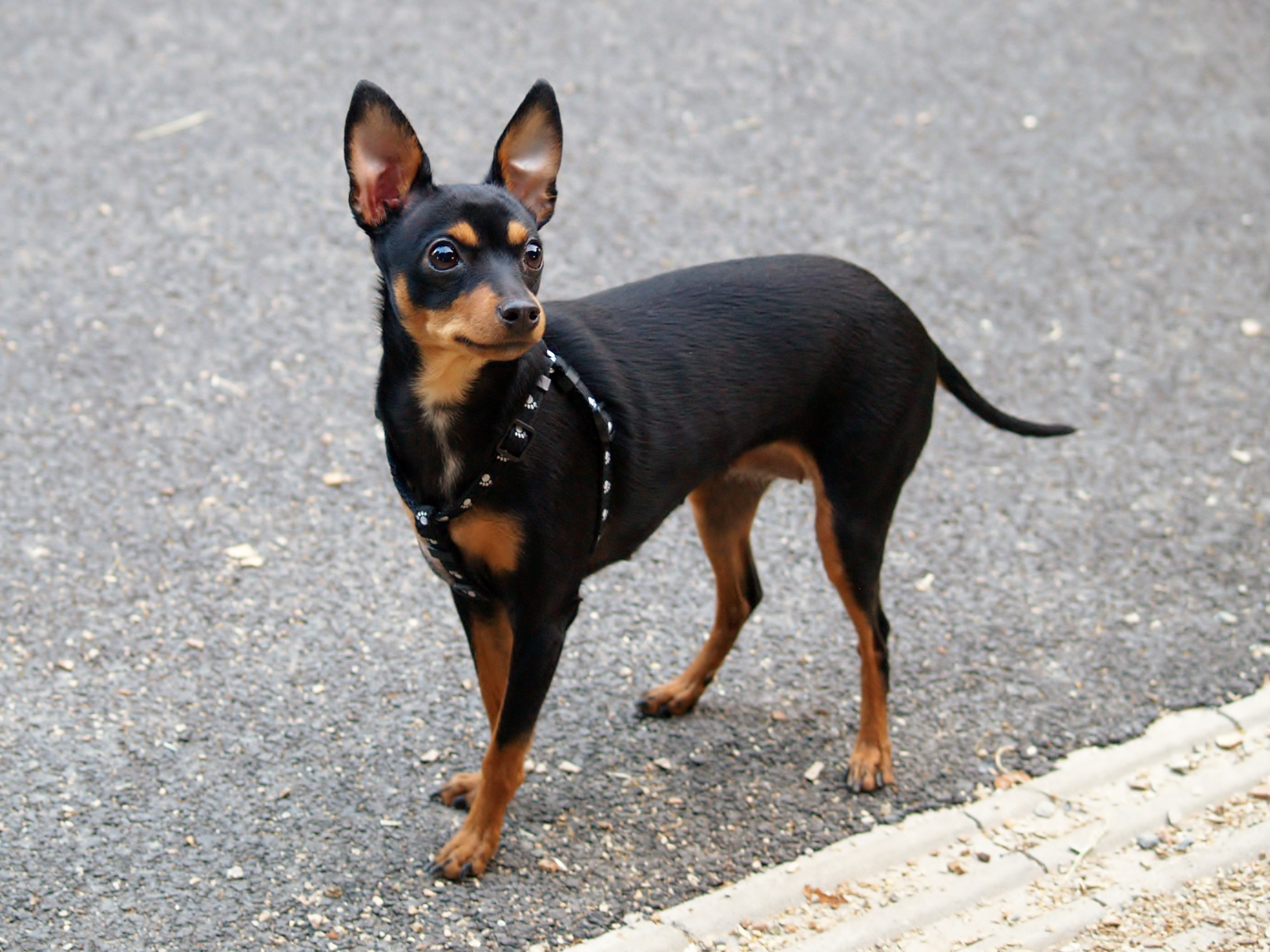
Pražský Krysařík

- Bohemian Shepherd (Chodský pes)
- Bohemian Spotted Dog (Český strakatý pes)
- Český Fousek
- Cesky Terrier (Český teriér)
- Czech Mountain Dog (Český horský pes)
- Czechoslovakian Wolfdog (Československý vlčák)
- Pražský Krysařík
- Beskydský bundáš (extinct)
- Český brakýř (extinct)
- Český tarač (extinct)
- Karlovarský Krysařík (extinct)

== Cat breeds ==
- Bohemian Rex (Česká kadeřavá kočka)
