= Animal breeds originating in Slovakia =

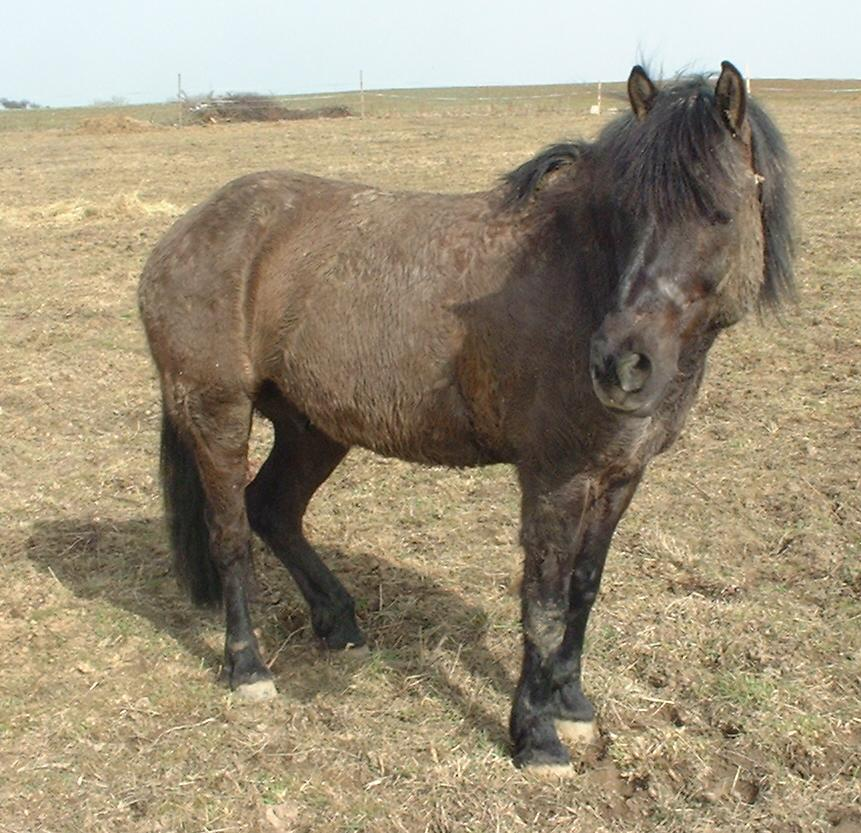
Hucul pony

This is a list of animal breeds originating in Slovakia.

== Slovak dog breeds ==
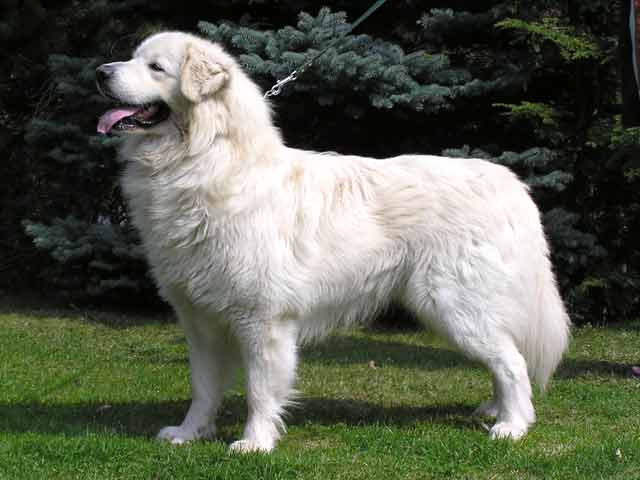
Slovak Cuvac

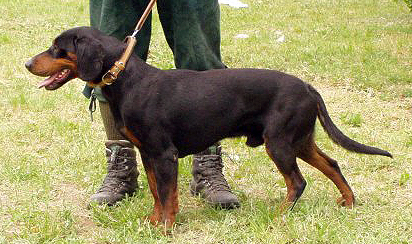
Slovenský kopov

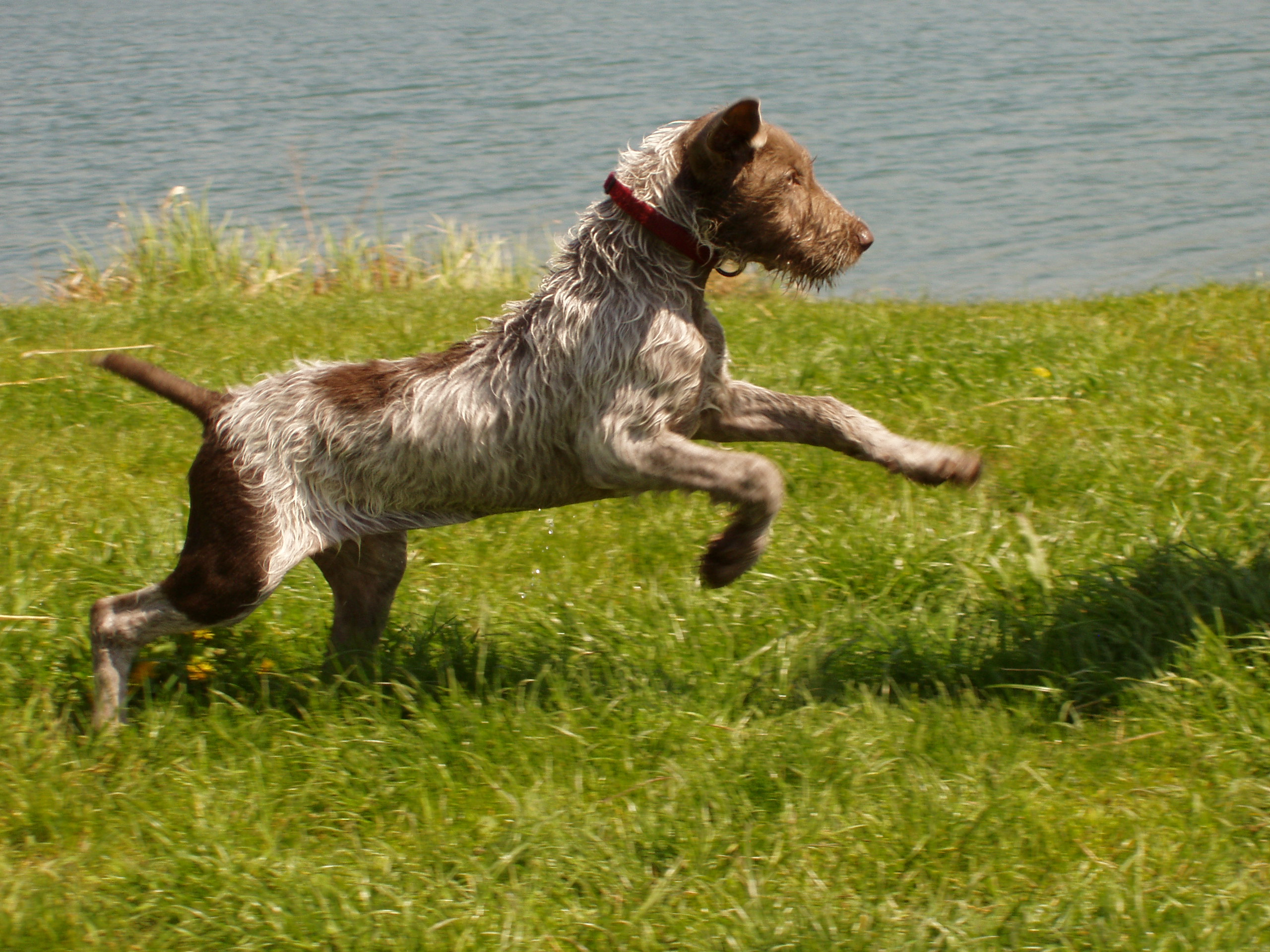
Slovak Rough-haired Pointer

- Slovak Cuvac (Slovenský čuvač)
- Slovenský kopov
- Slovak Rough-haired Pointer (Slovenský hrubosrstý stavač)
- Czechoslovakian Wolfdog (Československý vlčiak)

== Slovak horse breeds ==
- Hucul pony (Hucul, Huculský kôň)
- Slovak warm-blooded horse (Slovenský teplokrvník)
- Slovak sport pony (Slovenský športový pony)

== Slovak rabbit breeds ==
- Holic Rabbit (Holíčsky modrý králik)
- Liptov Baldspotted Rabbit (Liptovský lysko)
- Nitra Rabbit (Nitriansky králik)
- Slovak Greyblue Rex (Slovenský sivomodrý rex)
- Zemplin Rabbit (Zemplínsky pastelový králik)
- Zobor Rabbit (Zoborský králik)

== Slovak cattle breeds ==
- Slovak Spotted cattle (Slovenský strakatý dobytok)
- Slovak Pinzgau cattle (Slovenský pinzgauský dobytok)

== Slovak sheep breeds ==
- Domestic Tsigai (Cigája)
- Slovak merino sheep (Slovenská merinka)
- Native Wallachian sheep (Pôvodná valaška)
- Improved Wallachian sheep (Zošľachtená valaška)

== Slovak goat breeds ==
- White Shorthaired goat (Biela bezrohá krátkosrstá koza)
- Brown Shorthaired goat (Hnedá bezrohá krátkosrstá koza)

== Slovak chicken breeds ==
- Oravak hen

== Slovak goose breeds ==
- Slovak White Goose (Slovenská biela hus)
- Suchovy Goose (Suchovská hus)

== Slovak pigeon breeds ==
- Komorner Tumbler (Komárňanský kotrmeliak)
- Košice Tumbler (Košický kotrmeliak)
- Košice Highflier (Košický letún)
- Piestany Giant Pigeon (Piešťanský obor)
- Slovak Pouter (Slovenský hrvoliak)
- Slovak Highflier (Slovenský letún)
