= Laboratory dog =

Laboratory dog may refer to:

- Laboratory beagles
- Český strakatý pes, originally bred for lab purposes
