= Czech Mountain Dog =

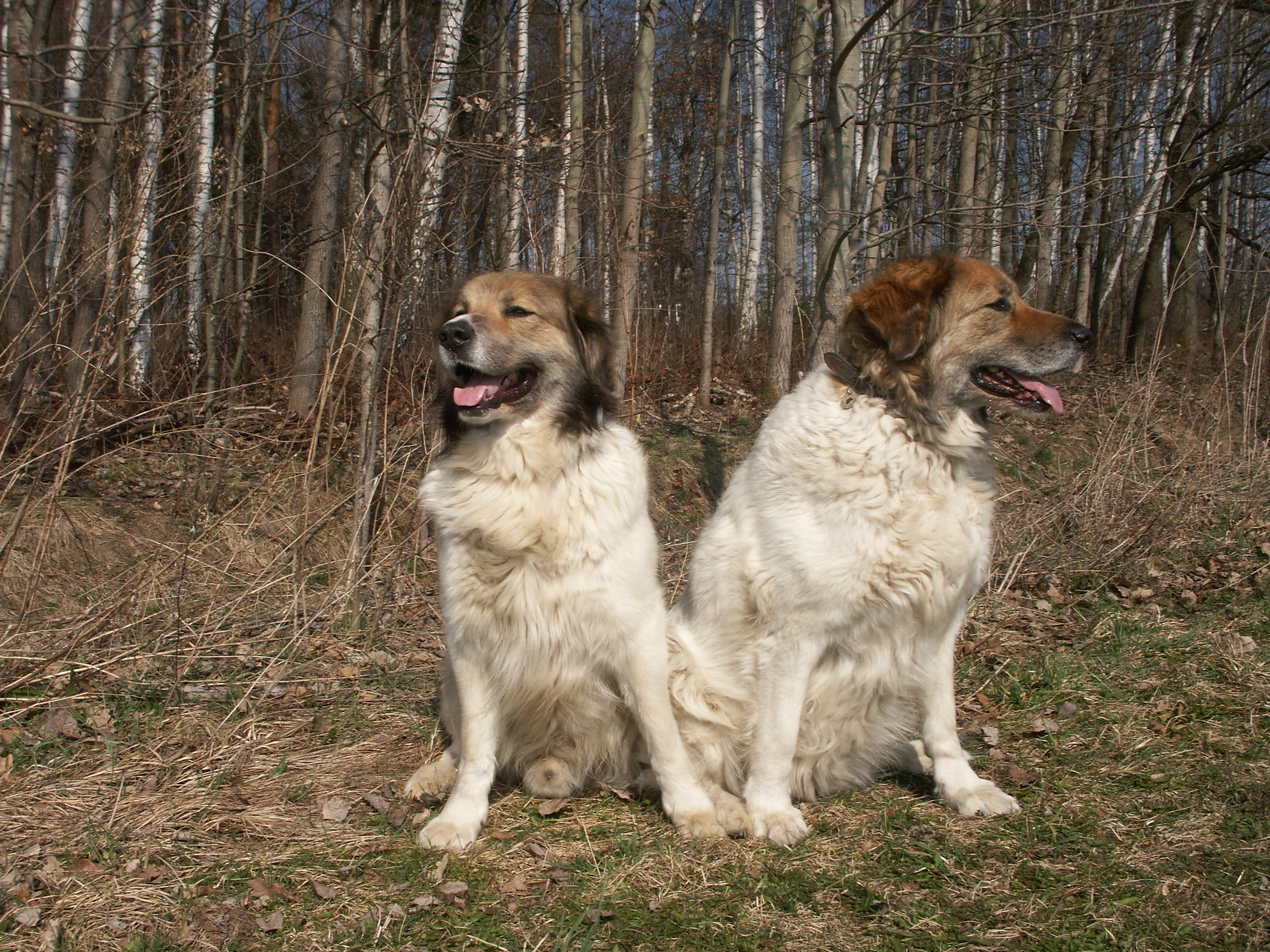
- Male and female Czech Mountain Dog
- Other names: Český horský pes, Bohemian Mountain Dog, Céhápéček
- Origin: Czech Republic
Kennel club standards
- Czech Kennel Club: standard

Czech Mountain Dog (Czech: Český horský pes) is a drafting and sled dog breed that originated in Czechoslovakia in the 1970s using Slovak Cuvac and a Canadian drafting dog.

== History ==
The breed began on August 12, 1977, when a litter of puppies was born to Petr Hanzlík from a planned cross between Galka, a female Slovak Cuvac, and Leif, a black-and-white draft dog imported from Athabasca, Canada. Hanzlík's goal was to create a robust, hardy, and low-maintenance dog that was easy to manage and versatile, particularly for tasks like drafting and dog sledding. The crossbreeding was prompted by the lack of Nordic draft breeds in Czechoslovakia at the time due to the Iron Curtain, as well as the challenges and limitations in using nonsled dog breeds for dog sledding.

The breed was named thusly: "Czech" for its Bohemian roots, "Mountain" for its suitability to mountainous regions, and "Dog" to complete the name. The Czech Mountain Dog is the youngest Czech breed, gaining official recognition by the Czech Kennel Club in 1984, but is not yet recognized with the Fédération Cynologique Internationale.

The breed's early development involved a small gene pool, which led to close inbreeding. A second attempt to include Leif in the breeding program was unsuccessful, so the dogs were bred solely among themselves. The first puppy owners were carefully selected to ensure the dogs would be put to active use, with the intention of incorporating them into future breeding efforts. Through diligent breeding practices, Czech Mountain Dogs gradually gained recognition, and the sport of dog sledding began to take off in the Czech Republic, with Czech Mountain Dog owners becoming trailblazers in the sport, including dryland sled racing such as bikejoring. The Czech Mountain Dog Club also played a key role in organizing the country's first dog sled races and Czech Mountain Dogs have raced in the Šediváčkův long, one of the most challenging sled dog races in Europe.

In the 1990s, the Czech Mountain Dog experienced significant growth. The number of individuals bred increased, and inbreeding was reduced. To further enhance the breed and minimize the effects of inbreeding, other carefully selected breeds were introduced.

As the number of Czech Mountain Dogs grew, their use expanded beyond sledding. They became increasingly versatile, finding roles as search and rescue dogs, herding dogs, and excelling in tracking, obedience, and agility. Their friendly nature also made them suitable for pet therapy, while their strength and endurance made them reliable companions for carrying or pulling loads. The Czech Mountain Dog is also becoming a popular choice as a family dog, known for being a good companion and a reliable watch dog.

== Appearance ==
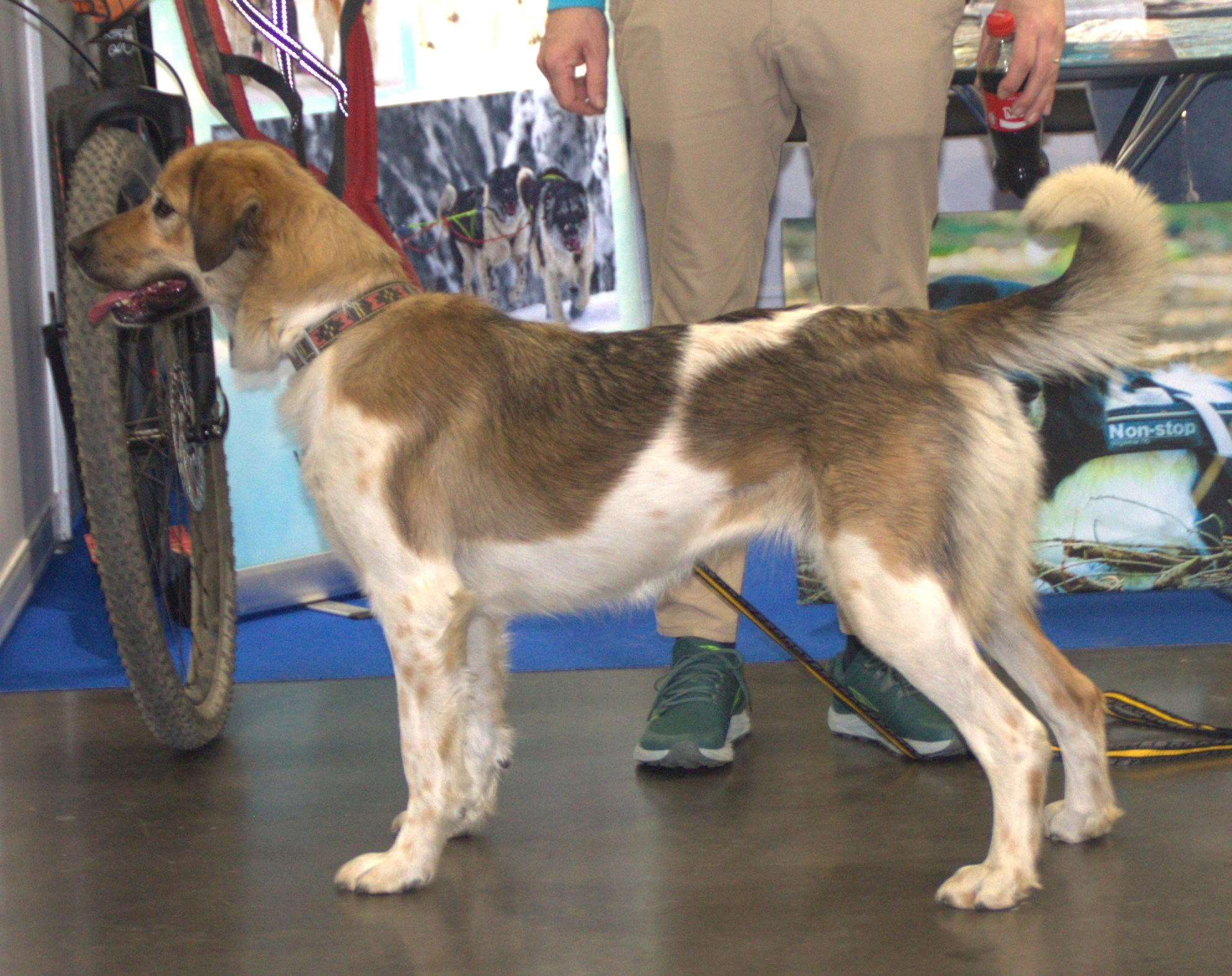
Czech Mountain Dog, Brno April 2025.

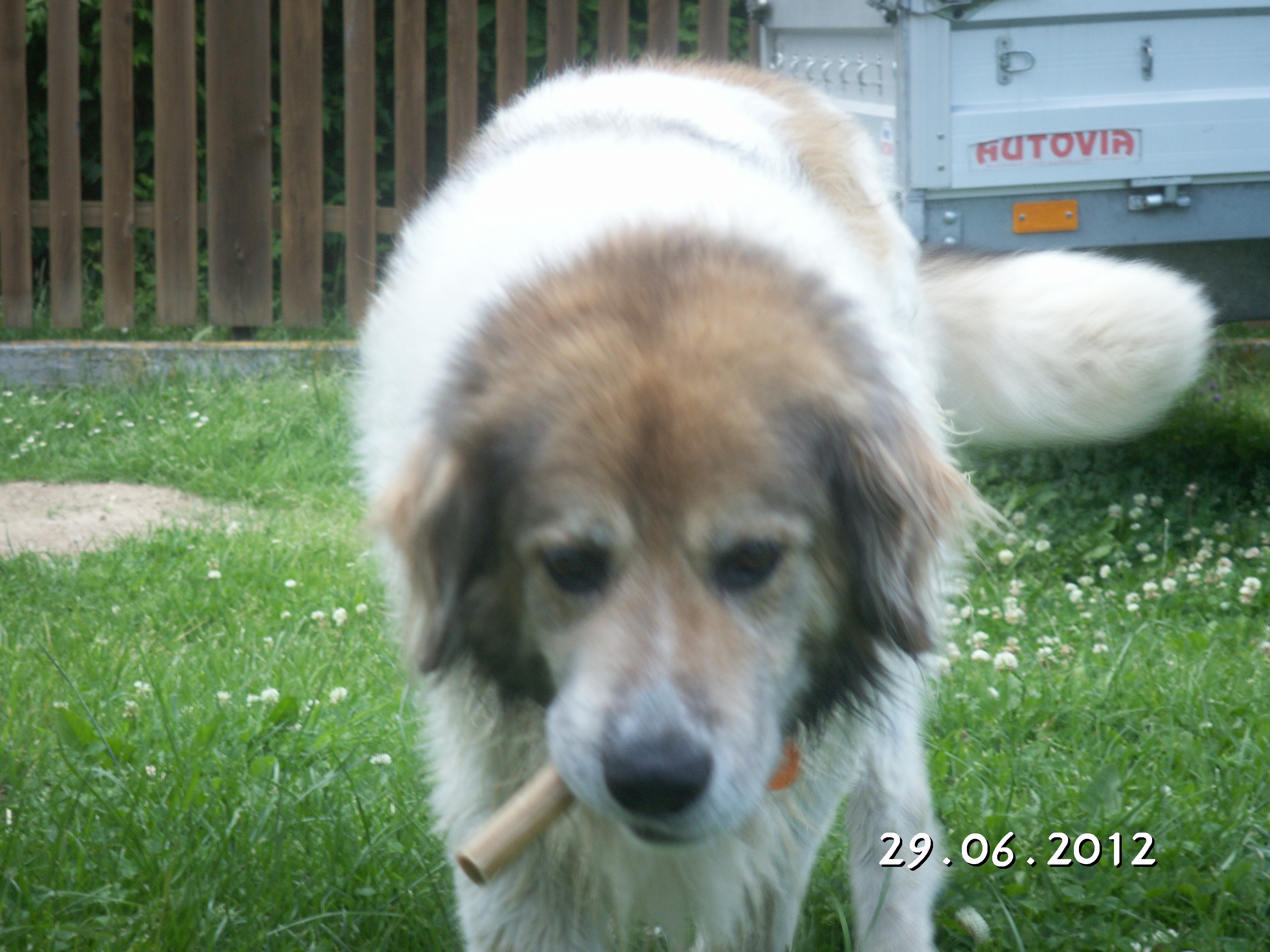

Male Czech Mountain Dogs measures 60–70 centimetres (24–28 in) at the withers, 56–66 centimetres (22–26 in) for the female. Male dogs weigh about 30–40 kilograms (66–88 lb) and female dogs weigh 26–36 kilograms (57–79 lb).

It has a black nose and medium-sized, oval, brown eyes that give him a mild and pleasant expression. It has strong lips, under which hide large teeth with a regular scissor or pincer bite. Large, triangular, and overhanging ears are set high and far apart. The neck is of medium length, strong, muscular and without a lobe.

The body shape is slightly rectangular. The chest reaches the elbows and is long and oval. The abdomen is slightly retracted. His richly furry tail is exactly in the line of his back. When the dog is at rest, the tail is pointing down. When the dog is happy or excited, it carries it over its back and looks like a sickle. The back is straight and firm. It moves on straight, long and strong legs with large oval paws.

The Czech Mountain Dog has about 10 centimetres (3.9 in) long, dense, straight, harder,and mottled white fur with brown or black spots. The fur is shorter on the head and on the front sides of the legs, and in winter it grows with a rich undercoat. The head is colored all over or has a white patch. The spots on the body are irregularly distributed.

== Temperament ==
Czech Mountain Dogs are versatile sports and working dogs, intended for the mountains. Their ideal temperament is friendly, confident, and lively; they are relatively unlikely to be aggressive. Czech Mountain Dogs thrive with patient and consistent training, especially when given proper motivation. Due to their high energy levels, they need plenty of exercise, making them suitable for active families.

Czech Mountain Dog lives for around 11-12 years.

== See also ==
- List of dog breeds
