= Šumavanka =

Breed of chicken

Šumava chicken
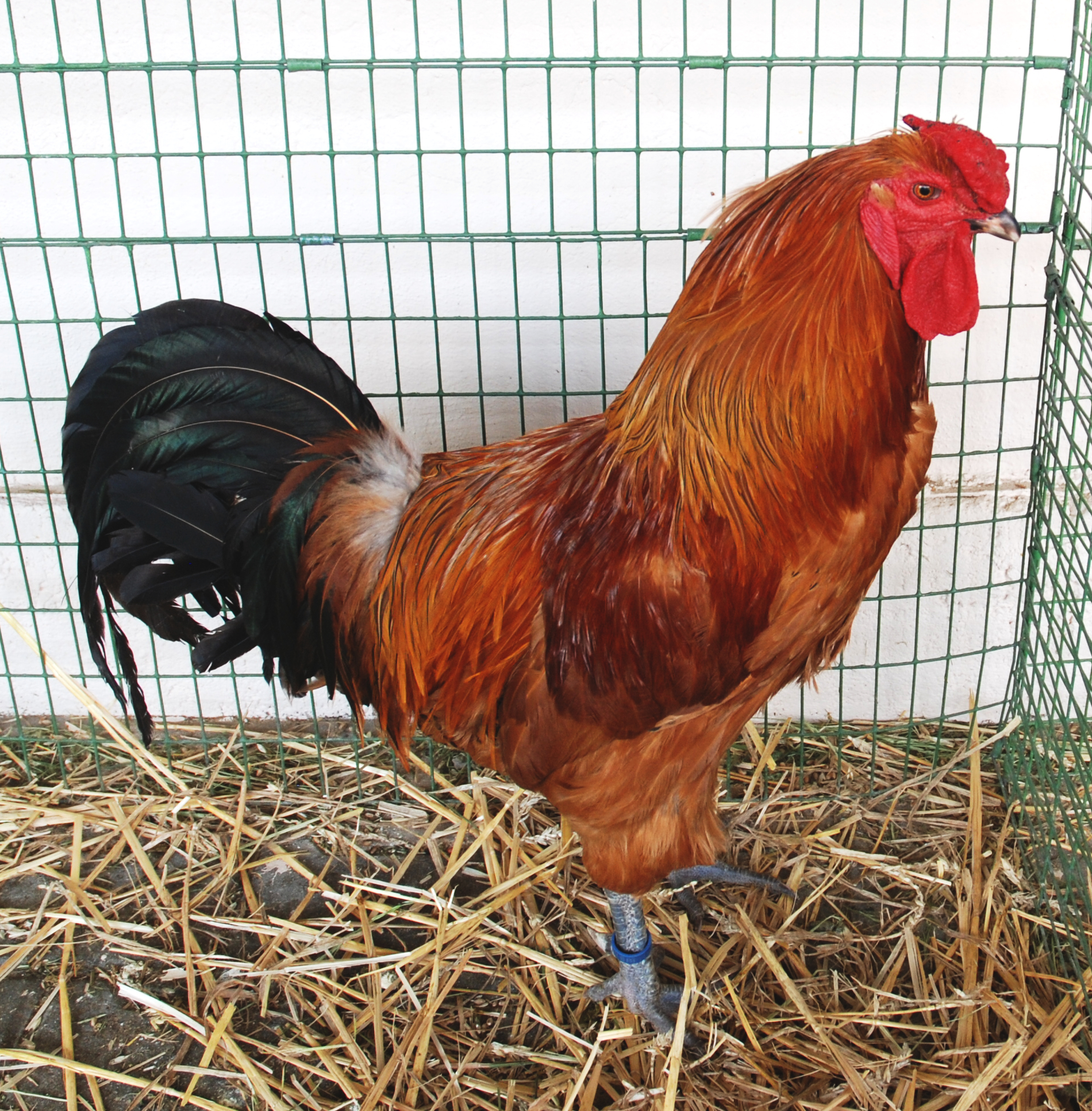
- Šumava cock
- Conservation status: rare
- Other names: Šumavanka
- Country of origin: Czech Republic

Traits
- Weight: Male: 2.9–3.6 kg; Female: 2.4–3.1 kg
- Egg color: brown

Classification
- Chicken; Gallus gallus domesticus

The Šumava is an old breed of chicken originating in the Bohemian Forest in the Czech Republic. Original Šumava chickens became extinct, but in the second half of 20th century, the breed was restored by crossing a few remaining animals from the original population with Czech gold brindle chicken, yellow Plymouth Rock, Rhode Island, New Hampshire and Wyandotte.

Hens produce around 180 eggs per year, each weighing about 58 grams (2.0 oz).
