= Šediváčkův long =

Sled dog race in the Czech Republic

Coordinates: 50°17′30″N 16°20′50″E

The route of the race is located in the Hradec Králové Region of the Czech Republic

Šediváčkův long, sometimes called the Czech Long Trail, is a 222-kilometre (138 mi) or 333-kilometre (207 mi) international sled dog race in the Orlické Mountains in the Hradec Králové Region of the Czech Republic. It takes place every year in the last week of January. Regarded as one of Europe's toughest dog sled races, teams ascend a total elevation of more than 7,500 metres (24,600 ft).

== History ==
The first race took place at the initiative of musher Pavel Kučera in February 1997. The race was named in honor of the dog Šediváček, who escaped the day before the inaugural race and was shot. Since then, the race has been held annually, with the exception of 2021 when it was cancelled due to the COVID-19 pandemic. The 27th race was held in January 2025. Every year since the second year, Šediváčkův long has been the Czech long-distance championship.

== Route ==
The total length of the four-stage race is 222 kilometres (138 mi). Despite being held in the relatively low-lying Orlické Mountains and under mild winter conditions of Central Europe, the Šediváčkův Long is considered one of Europe's toughest dog sled races due to its steep descents followed by tough climbs, a significant total elevation gain of 7,500 metres (24,600 ft) through diverse terrain ranging from dense forests, where the trail winds through fallen trees, to open plains, where the biting icy wind hits the team. In some years of the race, there is also a "superlong" category with five stages and a length of 333 kilometres (207 mi).

The race regulations prescribe a maximum load of 7 kg (15 lb) per dog, including full equipment and survival gear, for all classes of sleds. The race also includes a mandatory bivouac (overnight stay in the snow). The race begins and ends in Jedlová, part of Deštné v Orlických horách, Czech Republic, and follows a route through the Czech border with Poland.

Mushers from throughout Europe regularly participate in the race using a variety of Nordic breeds, including Siberian Huskies, Alaskan Malamutes, Greenland Dogs, Samoyeds, Alaskan huskies and European sled dogs, as well as Czech's native sled dog, the Czech Mountain Dog. Racers may participate on dogsled but may also race in a skijor class and a bikejor class.

The route of the race traditionally starts in the settlement of Jedlová v Orlických horách and heads to the ridges of the Orlické Mountains. The route may change due to snow conditions and landowners but usually passes through the village of Sedloňov, then going around the peak of Velká Deštná before passing through Orlické Záhoří and back to Jedlová.
