= Suchovy goose =

Breed of goose

The Suchovy goose (Slovak: Suchovská hus) is a breed of domestic goose originating in Suchá nad Parnou in Slovakia. The Suchovy goose was selectively bred in the 1980s from locally present domestic geese.

The Suchovy goose generally weighs 6.5–7.5 kg (14–17 lb) for male and 5.5–6.5 kg (12–14 lb) for female. They reach maturity at 310–320 days old. They lay around 14–16 eggs of weight 140 g (5 oz).

== Population ==
With respect to the small number (150 females and 75 males) of the population, the Suchovy goose is considered to be endangered breed.

Trend of breed Suchovy goose frequency
Year	Number of breeders	Male	Female	Total
2001	18	20	52	72
2002	24	29	53	82
2003	23	26	41	67
2004	29	34	88	122
2005	28	43	100	143
2006	35	47	94	141
2007	27	44	96	140
2008	21	40	96	136
2009	21	41	73	114
2010	19	25	57	82
Average	25	35	75	110

== See also ==
- List of goose breeds
- Animal breeds originating in Slovakia
