= Beskydský bundáš =

Dog breed

Beskydský bundáš was the original Beskydy breed of dog used for work on the mountain meadows of the Beskydy, where it helped the shepherds guard the sheep. According to the legend, he was an excellent shepherd, but a bad guard, so the Gorals crossed him with a German Shepherd. Pure white puppies were born from this union, inheriting the best traits from both parents. It was still widely seen in the 1950s. In the 1970s, the regeneration of the breed was supposed to take place, but it did not succeed.

Prof. MVGr. Antonín Hrůza (* January 1, 1865 Plzeň, † March 10, 1950 Brno), who was at the birth of the organized breeding of Slovak Cuvac mentions Beskydský bundáš in his works.

== Description ==
Beskydský bundáš was a medium-sized shepherd-type dog with erect ears. According to Antonín Hrůza it had a height of 45 to 55 cm. It resembled a Slovak Cuvac, but with the height of the withers and, above all, the raised ears resembling Bohemian Shepherd. It was exclusively white with long and bushy fur. Its undercoat very dense. His rich fur (the so-called bunda-coat) gave it the name bundáš - the Hungarian term "bunda" means "fur" (originally Hungarian fur coat), i.e. bundáš means shaggy dog.

== Occurrence ==
Beskydský bundáš was also called Slezský ovčák (Silesian Shepherd) suggesting that the breed was bred especially in the area of Těšín Silesia, where it has always been part of typical folklore. In the 1970s, this breed existed not only in the Beskydy Mountains and northern Moravia, but also in the Bohemian-Moravian Highlands and northern Bohemia.

== See also ==
- List of dog breeds
