= Bohemian Fairy Swallow pigeon =

Breed of pigeon

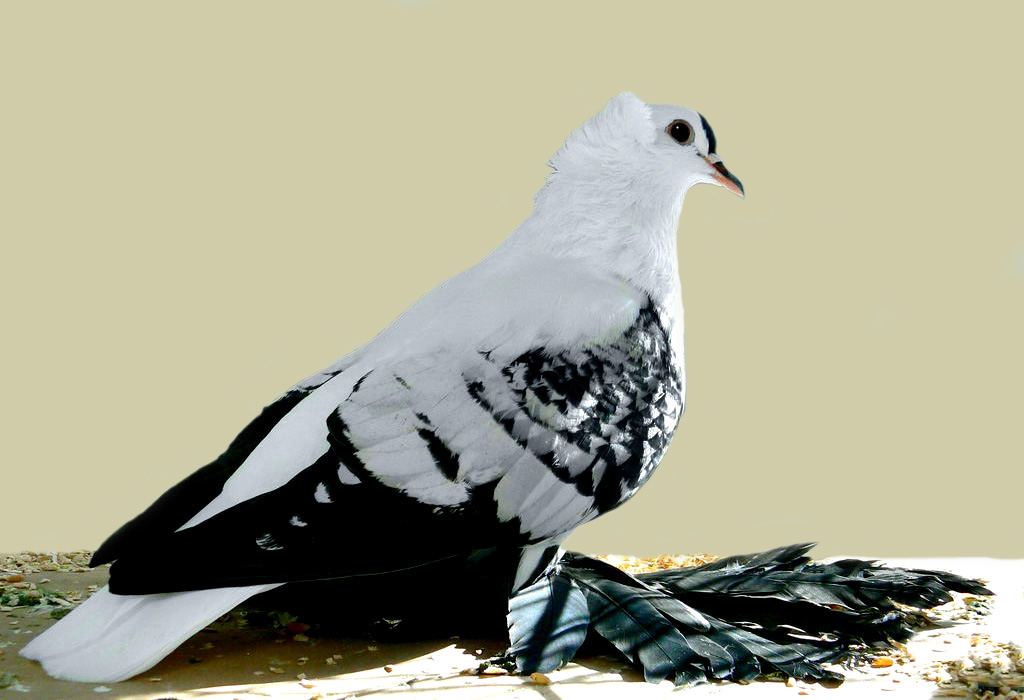
Bohemian Fairy Swallow

The Bohemian Fairy Swallow is a breed of fancy pigeon. Bohemian Fairy Swallows, along with other varieties of domesticated pigeons, are all descendants from the Rock Pigeon (Columba livia).

== See also ==
- List of pigeon breeds
