= Slovak White goose =

Breed of goose

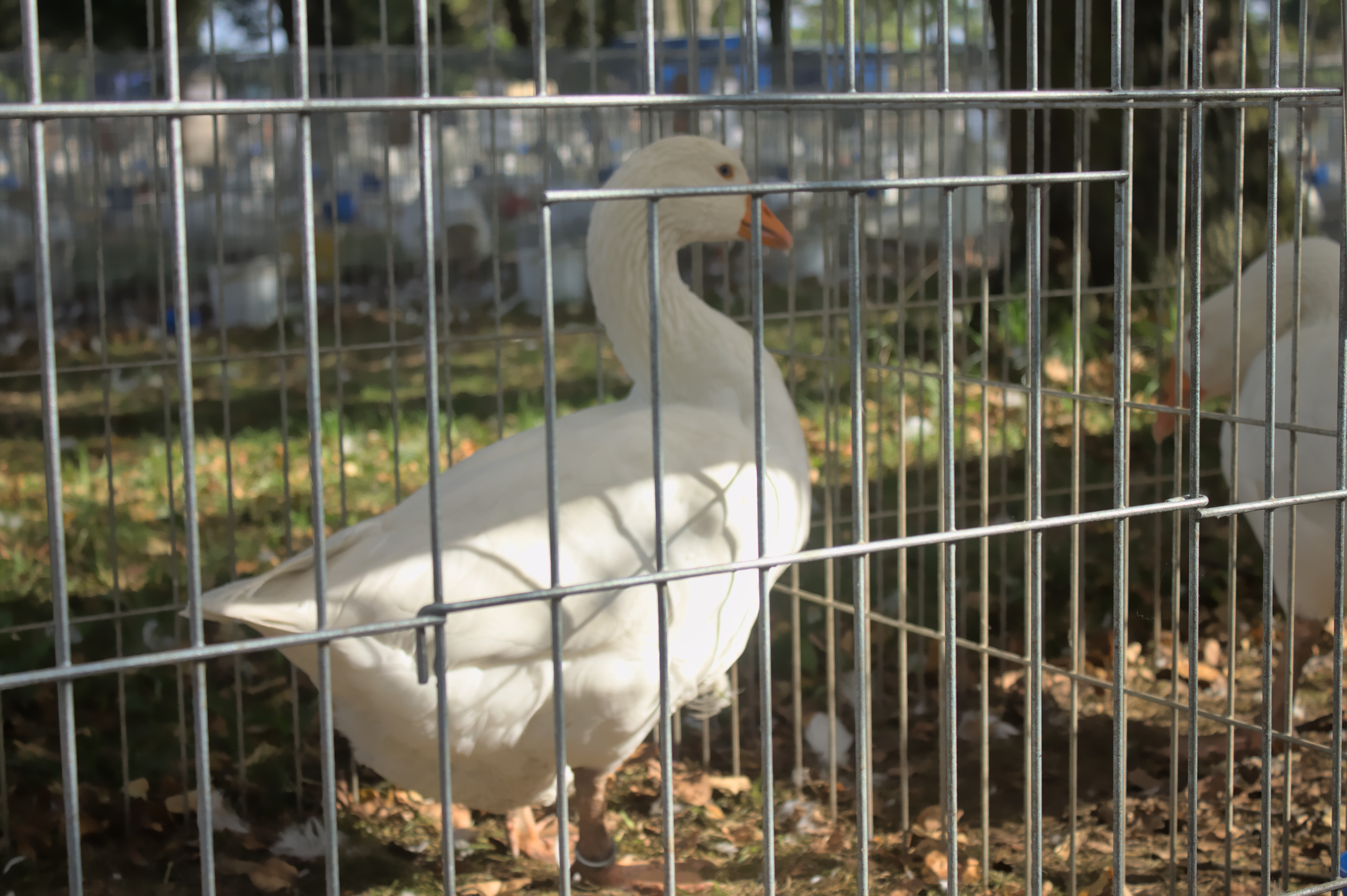
Slovak White goose

The Slovak White goose (Slovak: Slovenská biela hus) is a breed of domestic goose originating in Nitra in Slovakia. The Slovak White goose is an autochthonous breed of Slovakia.

Male Slovak White geese generally weigh around 7 kg, and females 6 kg. They lay around 14–18 eggs, which weigh 160 g.

Due to low population numbers (200 females and 100 males) the Slovak White goose is considered to be an endangered breed.

== See also ==
- List of goose breeds
