= Czech Red rabbit =

Breed of rabbit

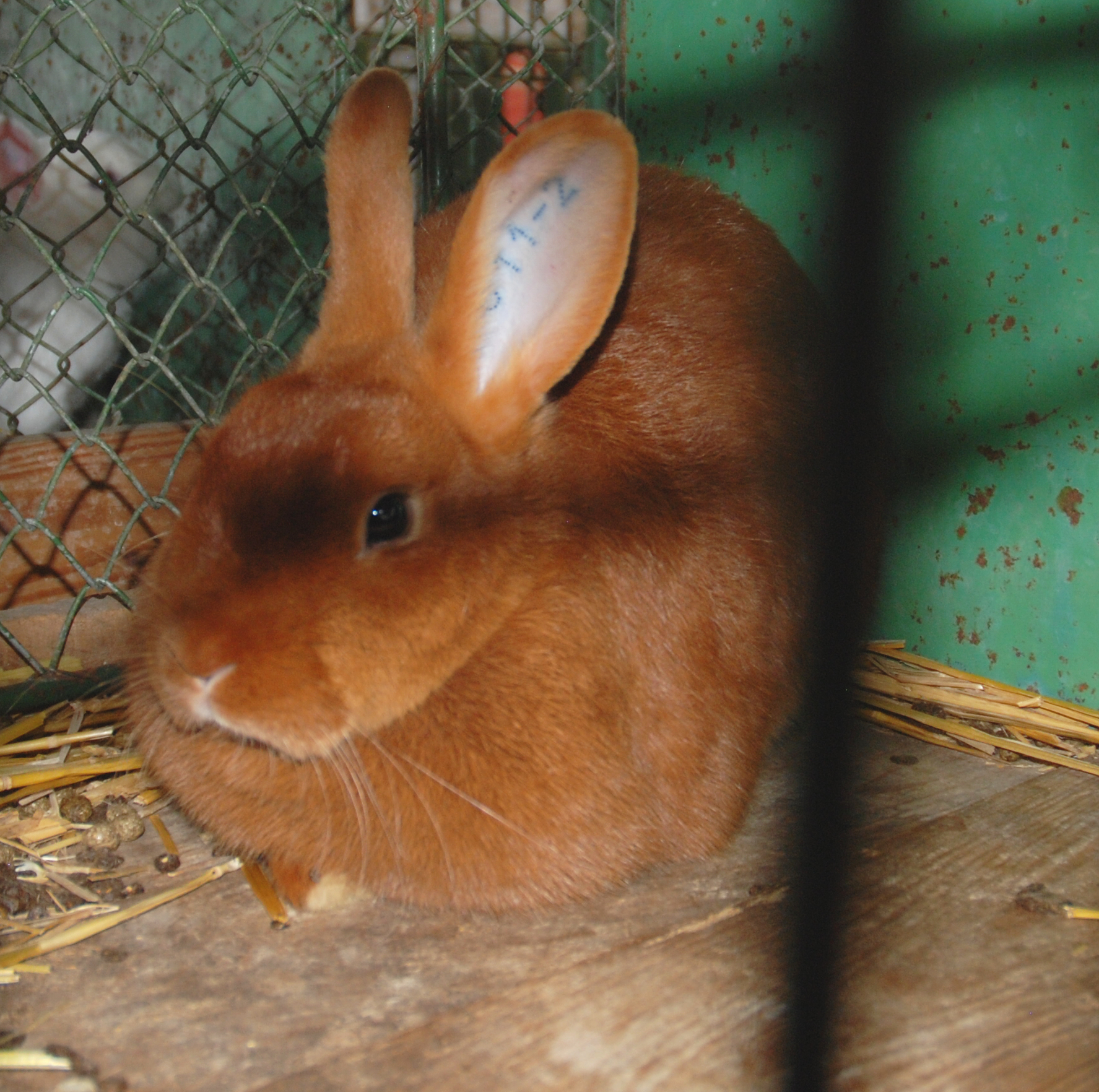

The Czech Red (Czech: Český červený králík) is a domestic rabbit breed from what is now the Czech Republic. It was officially recognized in 1959. It weighs about 2.50 to 3.20 kg. The colour of the hair is gray or red-brown. It was selected by Theodor Svododa from Modřany in 1940. There are about 150 officially registered animals bred. The male has a semi-arch body and the female has a commercial body.
