= White Shorthaired =

Breed of goat

The White Shorthaired goat is a dairy breed from the Czech Republic. It is the result of selective breeding of native Czech landrace goats crossed with Swiss Saanen goats.

== Sources ==
- White Shorthaired Goat
