= Bohemian Rex =

Breed of cat

- Other names: Czech Curly Cat
- Common nicknames: Rex
- Origin: Czech Republic

The Bohemian Rex (also known as Czech Curly Cat) is a breed of domestic cat. It is registered by Fédération Internationale Féline as non-recognised breed.

== Description ==
Bohemian Rex is very similar to Persian cat but has long curly hair. It has a robust body with short limbs. Head is large, broad with a typically short muzzle and large round eyes that are typically orange in color. Ears are smaller, with rounded tips. The fur can have any color shade or combination. In adulthood, the Czech curly cat weighs around 4 to 7 kg.

== Temperament ==
Bohemian Rex is intelligent but lazy breed. It has a calm and friendly nature. They like their peace and prefer calmer life pace. They can get nervous and shy if their owner doesn't give them their space and a place to hide. They can get along with other animals but its preferable to choose animals with similarly peaceful and calm temperament. well cats may have problem with smaller children as they don't like wild games.

== History ==
The breed originates in the Czech Republic. First kittens were born in 1981 by the accidental appearance of curly kittens in the litter of Persian cats. Breeders then tried to maintain the hair curly using genetics which decreased fertility of cats. Breeders attempted to register the breed at Fédération Internationale Féline (FIFE) in 1994. FIFE decline to recognise the breed due to low number of specimen. This led to decrease of interest in the breed. There are several breeding stations in the Czech Republic that focus on breeding of Bohemian Rex. There are reportedly around 100 specimen with stable population.
