= Bohemian Spotted Dog =

Breed of dog

Český strakatý pes
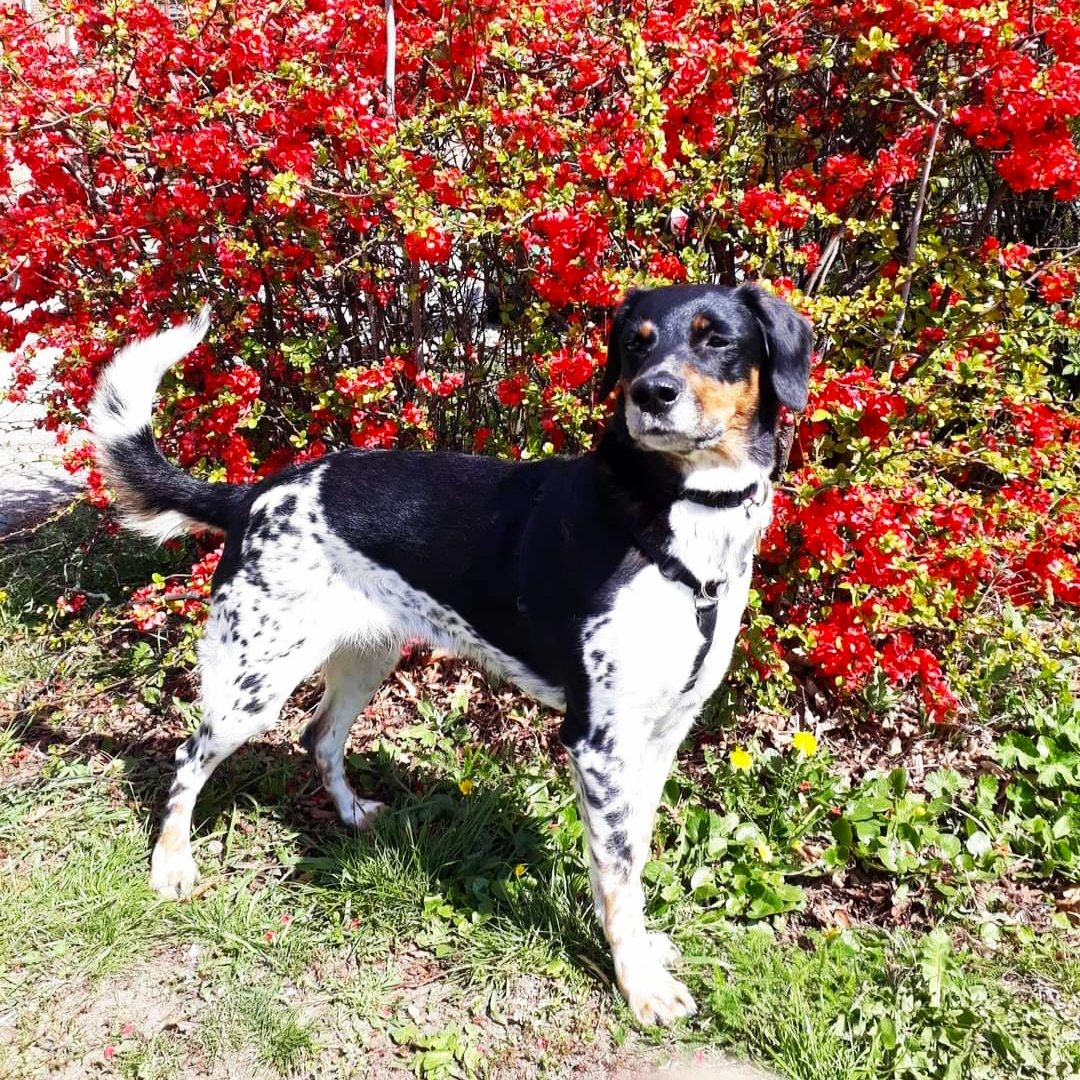
- Origin: Czech Republic
Traits
Height	Males	45–53 cm (18–21 in)
	Females	43–51 cm (17–20 in)
Kennel club standards
- CMKU: standard

The Bohemian Spotted Dog (Czech: český strakatý pes, originally Horák's laboratory dog - Horákův laboratorní pes) is a medium-sized dog breed. Originally bred for laboratory purposes by František Horák in Prague in the 1950s, the breed is now primarily a companion dog. This breed is recognized by the Czech Kennel Club but is not FCI recognized.

== History ==
Czech cynologist František Horák wanted to create an ideal dog for laboratory work. He described the desired characteristics in 1954: suitable size, smooth coat, high fertility, good nature and low food consumption. The first litter of pups was born the same year. Even though the breed was bred primarily for experiments, there is minimal evidence of any experiments on Bohemian spotted dogs at the Physiology Institute where the breeding took place. There are some speculations about successful transplantation of kidney because František Horák wrote a short note about it. There is evidence of tissue transplantations and that the dogs were studied for epilepsy. The existence of the breed remained a secret for the public until they were presented on a dog show in 1961. In 1981 some of the dogs in the institute were given to breeders. That's when breeders began calling them 'Bohemian spotted dogs'. Despite the promising start, the breed wasn't accepted as well as expected and the dogs were on the edge of extinction. Luckily, few enthusiasts discovered the history of the Bohemian spotted dog and even though there was almost nowhere to start with the rebirth of the breed, they collected 11 dogs all around the Czech Republic. Another litter of pups was born in 1994, which gave the breed new hope. As of 2022, there are about 600 Bohemian Spotted Dogs.

== Temperament ==
The breed is an excellent companion for inexperienced owners. They have a kind and outgoing temper. They tend to be non-aggressive because of the original purposes they were bred for. Still, they make good guarding dogs because they tend to bark at strangers. They are very friendly towards people and other dogs - they can live in a pack. If trained from a young age they can tolerate other animals, too. They are known to be very active making them good at sports such as agility and dog dancing. They are also used for dog therapy. They are very playful and have a strong bond with their family.

== Appearance ==
The Czech spotted dog is a medium-sized breed. Males reach a height at the withers of 45-53 cm, females 43-51 cm, the length of the trunk is 110-120% of the height of the withers. The structure of the body is harmonious and not too heavy, with a slightly rectangular frame with folded ears. There are both short and long coat variants. The short coat is layered with undercoat and close-fitting all over the body. The long coat, also with undercoat, is flowing and only slightly wavy.

=== Coloring ===
The fur is tri-colored, in two equal types of coloring, black-yellow-white and brown-yellow-white. The ratio between dark (black or brown) and white parts of the body is 1:1, with the base color being dark with yellow markings. The white fields are dotted yellow in the yellow area and dark in the dark area. The stippling is distinctly individual and should not create the impression of mottled coloring.

== Gallery ==
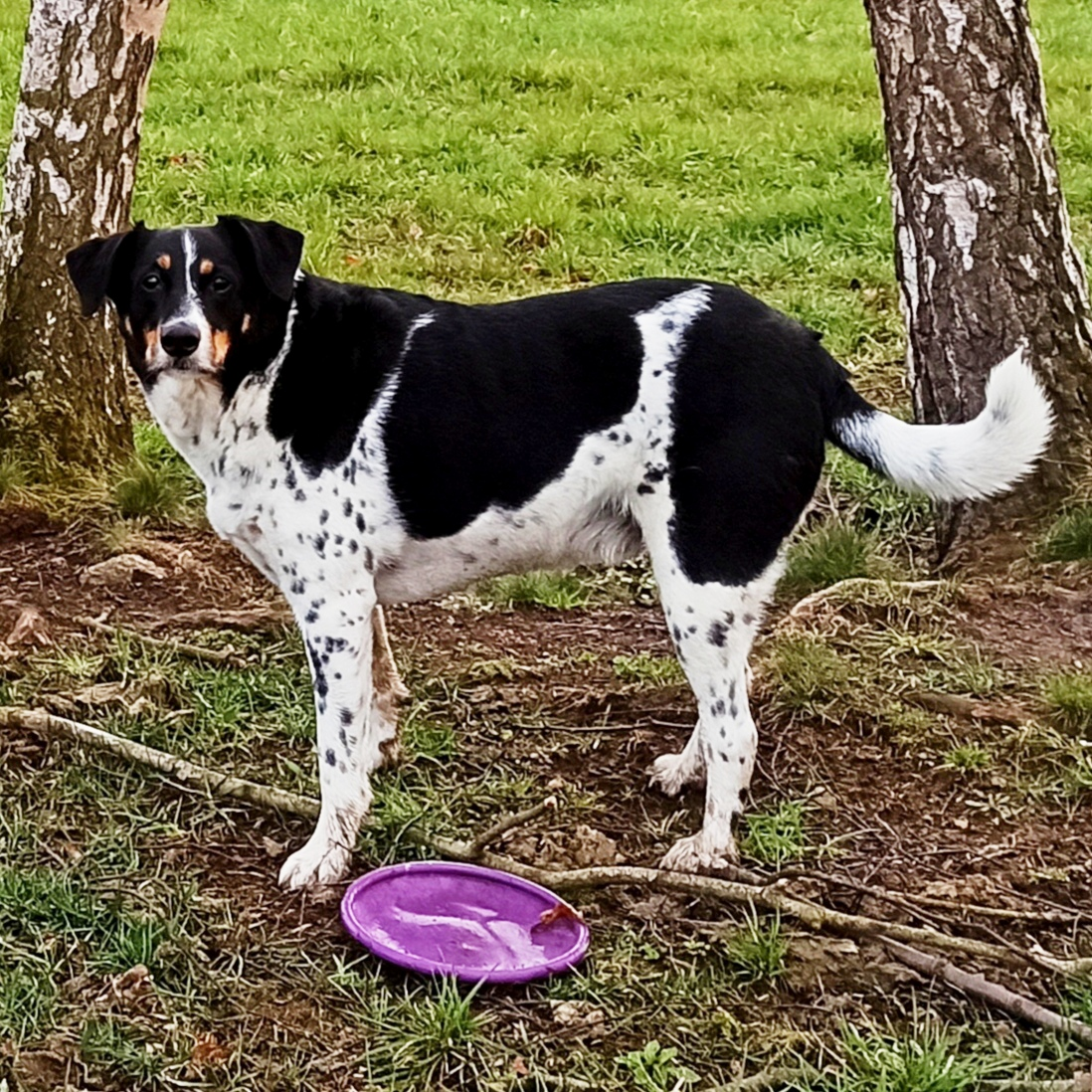

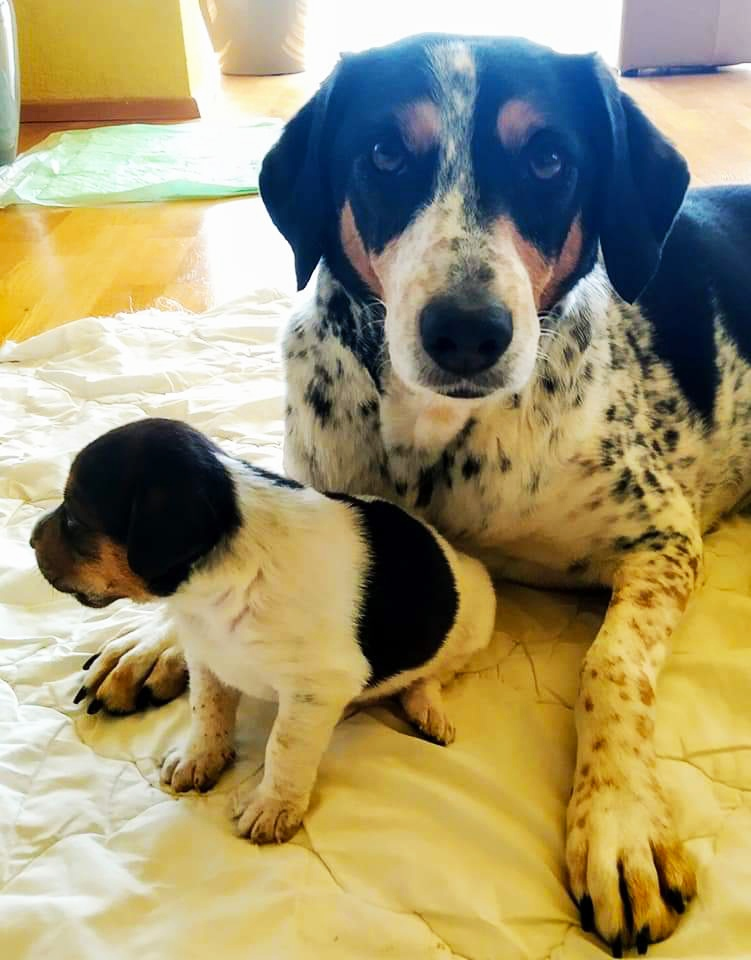

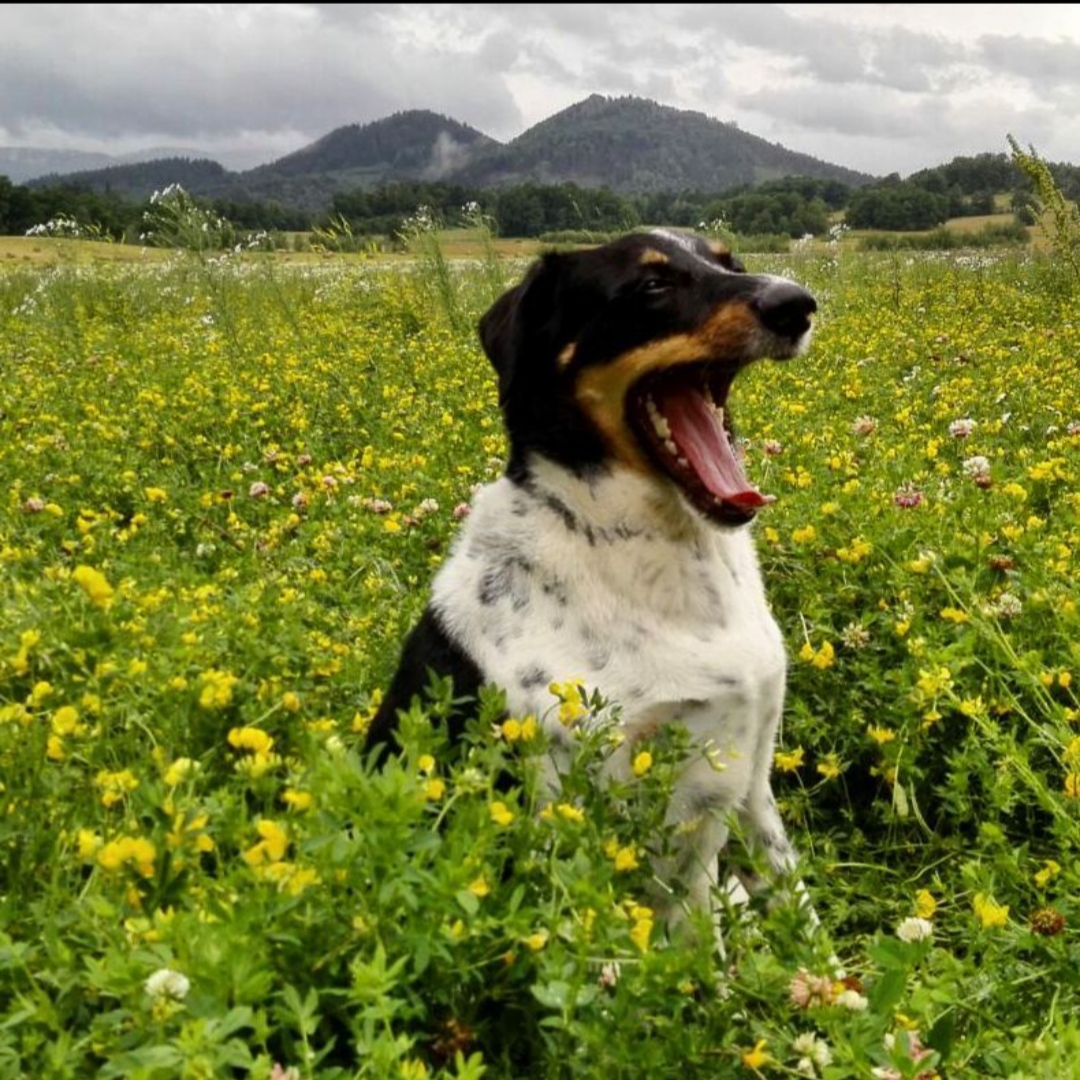

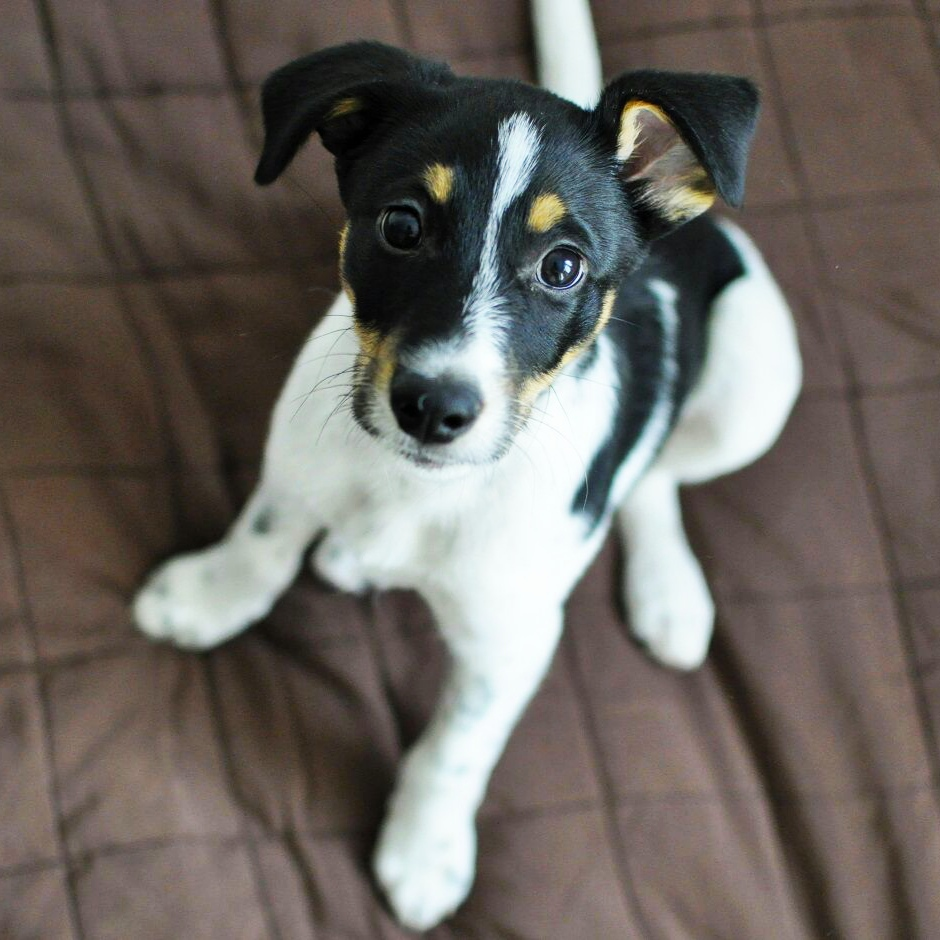

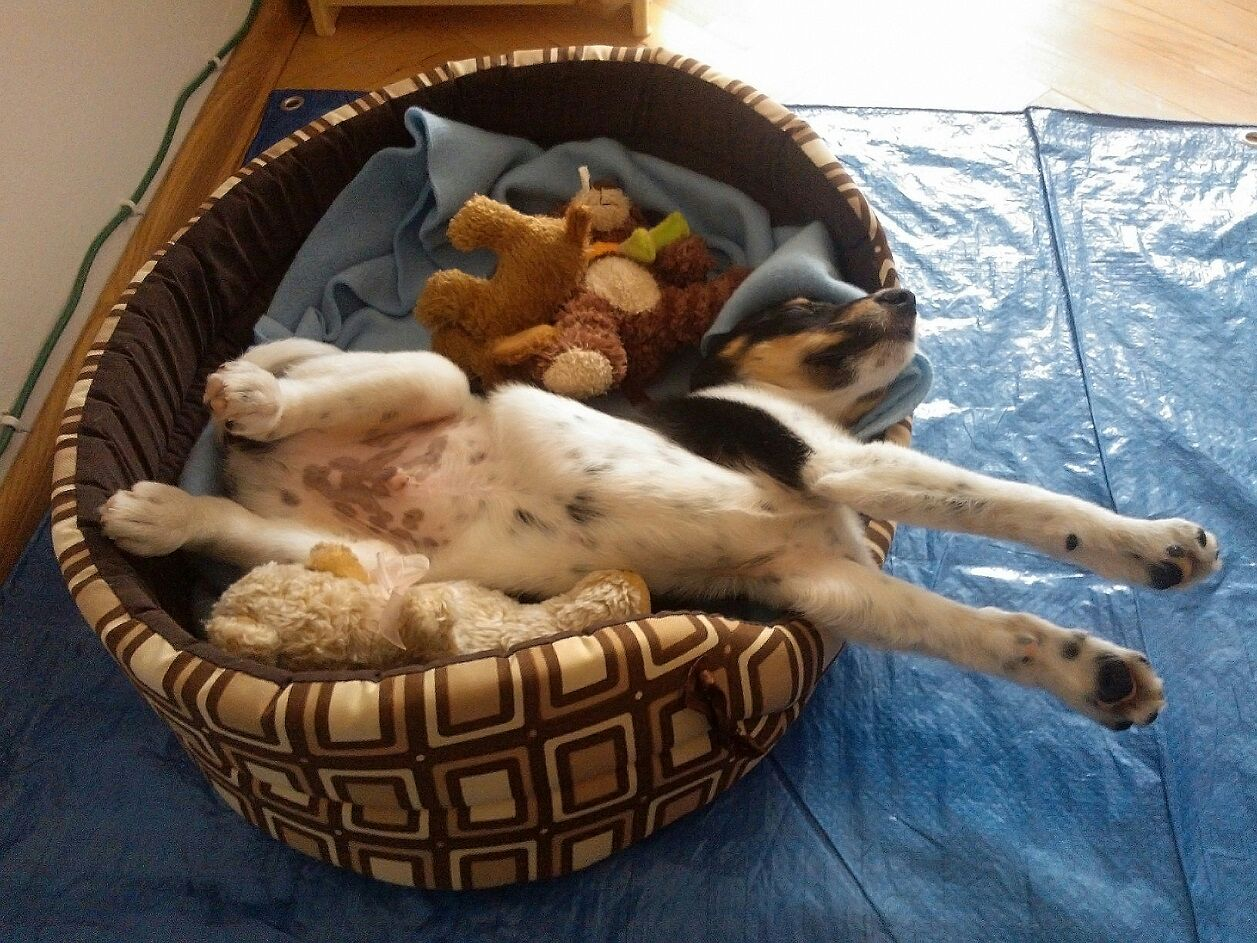

== Literature ==
- Hasil, Tomáš; Hochmanová, Irena (2014). Český strakatý pes : aneb Horákův laboratorní pes. Liberec. ISBN 978-80-87213-20-9.
