= Czech Gold Brindled Hen =

Czech breed of chicken

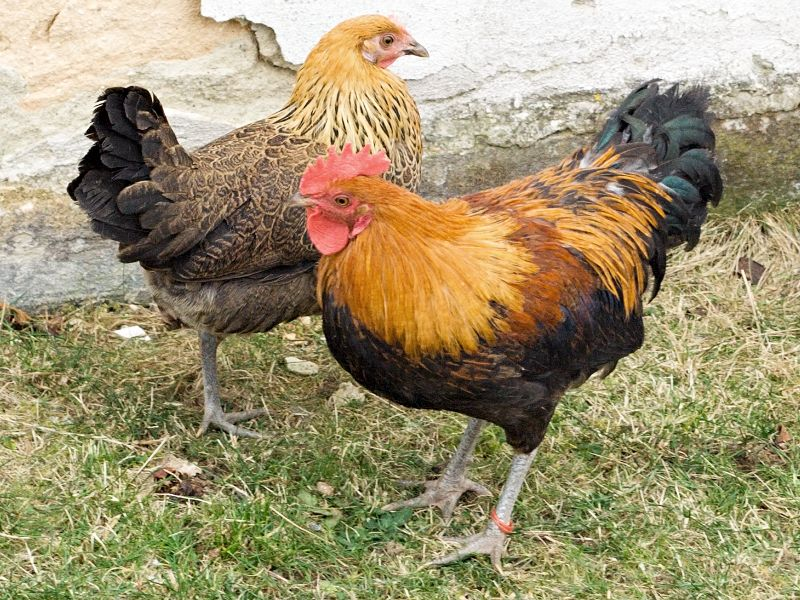
- Cock and hen
- Conservation status: rare
- Other names: Czech: Česká slepice zlatě kropenatá; Czech Gold Speckled; Bohemian Gold Speckled
- Country of origin: Czech Republic

Traits
- Weight: Male: 2.3–2.8 kg, maximum 3.3 kg; Female: 2.0–2.5 kg, maximum 3 kg
- Egg colour: cream (yellowish to pale brown)

Classification
- Chicken; Gallus gallus domesticus

The Czech Gold Brindled Hen, Czech: Česká slepice zlatě kropenatá, is an old breed of chicken originating in Bohemia. The first mention dates from 1205, when a flock of these chickens was presented to Valdemar II of Denmark as a wedding gift on his marriage to the Czech princess Dagmar of Bohemia. Nowadays it is an endangered breed.

== Description ==
Hens are mostly gold color only, while the rooster has gold feathers on the neck. The feathers on the back are brown to gold-red. Wings feathers are brown with green mirror. Tail is black. Breast are back with gold bringle. The beak is slate to dark brown with the yellow end. Hens are completely light brown gold brindled. On the head there is a single red comb. Legs are slate blue color. Hens produce 160 eggs per year of 55–60 g weight. Chicks hatch out light brown.
