= Slovak Cuvac =

Slovak Cuvac Slovenský čuvač
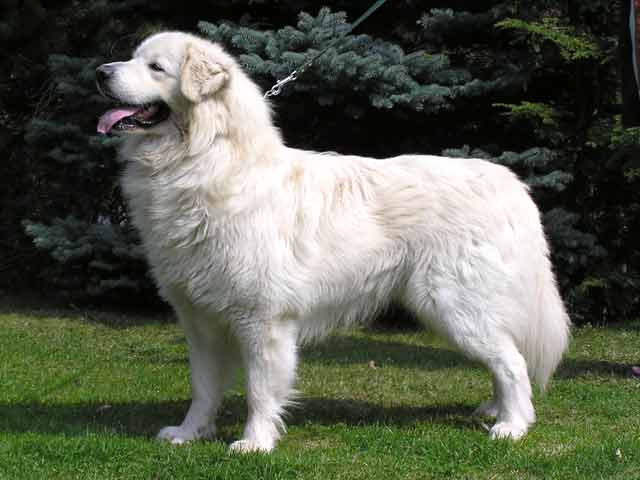
- Slovensky cuvac named Hunos Frigo
- Other names: Slovak Cuvac, Slovak Chuvach, Tatransky Cuvac, Slovak tschuvatsch
Traits
Height	Males	62–70 cm (24–28 in)
	Females	59–65 cm (23–26 in)
Weight	Males	36–44 kg (79–97 lb)
	Females	31–37 kg (68–82 lb)
- Coat: Medium length - thick and wavy
- Color: White
Kennel club standards
- Fédération Cynologique Internationale: standard

The Slovak Cuvac is a Slovak breed of dog, bred for use as a livestock guard dog. This breed—also known as Slovensky Cuvac, Slovak Chuvach, Tatransky Cuvac and Slovensky Kuvac—is closely related to the Hungarian Kuvasz. The alternate German and English spelling Tchouvatch reflects the approximate pronunciation of "chew-watch".

The breed is recognised under sponsorship from Slovakia by the Fédération Cynologique Internationale with the name Slovenský čuvač. Despite the multiple renderings in English, these refer to only one breed. The United Kennel Club in the US uses the English version of the name Slovak Cuvac.

== History ==
A good watchdog, guard, shepherd and companion, the dog proved itself also in watching cattle, turkeys, and other domestic animals – as well as its master's household. Holiday makers and visitors to the mountains and spas took to this breed and began to carry it to the lowlands. The Slovensky Cuvac is used on sheep farms and mountain ridges as well as homes and frontiers. He is boundlessly loyal and stout hearted. He resists every enemy – bears and wolves included. According to the time honored shepherd's tradition, he is always bred in white to be discernible from the beasts of the night.

This breed has been well documented as far back as the 17th century. However, as wolves slowly began to disappear from European mountains and modern herding practices were instituted, the Cuvac was faced with the prospect of being seen as a relic of the past. What few specimens were left in the 1950s were bred carelessly. Credit for reviving the breed and fixing characteristics is due Dr. Antonin Hruza, in cooperation with the veterinary school of Brno.

The registered breeding of the Slovensky Cuvac was established in Czechoslovakia by Professor Antonin Hruza from the Veterinary Faculty in Brno on June 4, 1929. The Club of the Breeders of Slovak Cuvac was established in 1933 and a written standard was established and approved in 1964 Dr. V. Kurz). The basic breeding material came from the vicinity of Liptovska Luzna, Kokava and Vychodna as well as from Rachov in the Carpathians.

== Description ==
The body of Slovak Cuvac is slightly longer than it is high. The breed's spinal ridge is noted to be strong and slightly sloped. The tail hangs low, reaching the animal's hock joints. The Cuvac's ribs reach the elbow joint and are well rounded, with the belly and flanks are slightly pulled. The Slovak Cuvac has straight legs that are placed vertically to its body and well angled. The Cuvac's paws are compact and rounded, with the hind paws being slightly longer than the front paws. Their necks are roughly as long as their head.

Their wide and elongated skulls are slightly arched, but the top of their heads are flat. The Cuvac's wide and heavy mouth is slightly narrowed to top of the nose and is slightly shorter than the skull. Their ears are placed high, reclined and fitted tightly to the head, and feature rounded ear points. The eyes are oval shaped with caps fitting closely, straight placed at the head. The Cuvac's jaws feature a scissors occlusion.

The Slovak Cuvac's fur is dense and rich; centre parting at the ridge is not allowed according to breed standards. Covering fur, which is constituted by fur with 5–15 cm length, completely covers the shorter, dense and soft undercoat. Males are known to have a thick collar of fur around the neck. A Cuvac's fur is always pure white; a yellowish tinge by ears is permissible, but not desirable. Their eyes are brown, and their muzzles, lips, and eyelids, like the paw pads, are black.

=== Appearance ===
The breed is an animal of imposing stature. It has a large head, half of which is taken up by the nasal canal. It has strong jaws, with a scissors bite. Their oval-shaped eyes are dark and lively. The ears are long and hanging while carried on the sides of the head. The tail is thickly furred, and it hangs down when the dog is at rest. The coat is completely white, and the hair can be as much as 4 inches (10 cm) long.

=== Height and weight ===
The height for males can be as much as 28 inches (71 cm), while females at the most are 26 inches (66 cm) in height. The weight for males ranges 77 - 99 pounds and the weight for females is 66 - 88 pounds.

=== Temperament ===
The dog is known for its hardy constitution, sturdy frame and shaggy white coat. Its frame is massive, and its temperament is naturally lively, watchful, undaunted and alert. These dogs thrive best in an environment of a large family, children and livestock to care for. Farms and ranches make the best homes. These dogs are natural guard dogs. They are gentle and loyal with their family and possessions.

== Care ==
Regular grooming keeps the white coat clean and attractive, and furniture free of white "mohair". The annual shed of dense underwool requires vigorous brushing and bathing sessions in the Spring.

== See also ==
- List of dog breeds
