= Rote Liste =

German red list of domestic animal breeds

Rote Liste der bedrohten Nutztierrassen im Bundesgebiet
- Formation: 1987
- Type: annual list
- Headquarters: Witzenhausen, Hesse, Germany
- Region served: Germany
- Official language: German
- Parent organization: Gesellschaft zur Erhaltung alter und gefährdeter Haustierrassen
- Affiliations: Bund Deutscher Rassegeflügelzüchter
- Website: g-e-h.de/rote-liste-menu/rote-liste

The Rote Liste, full name Rote Liste der bedrohten Nutztierrassen im Bundesgebiet, (Note: Translatable as: Red list of the threatened livestock breeds in the Federal Territory) is a red list of threatened breeds of domestic animal published annually by the Gesellschaft zur Erhaltung alter und gefährdeter Haustierrassen, the German national association for the conservation of historic and endangered domestic animal breeds.

== History ==
The GEH was founded in Witzenhausen, in Hesse, central Germany, in 1981. In 1987 it established the criteria on which the Rote Liste is based. The list is published annually, and attributes one of four categories of conservation risk to domestic breeds of cattle, dogs, goats, horses, pigs, rabbits and sheep, of chickens, ducks, geese and turkeys, and of bees; listing of domestic pigeon breeds is in preparation. Some breeds from outside Germany are listed separately. The four levels of risk are:

- I: extrem gefährdet, extremely endangered
- II: stark gefährdet, seriously endangered
- III: gefährdet, endangered
- Vorwarnstufe, alert

The risk level is calculated using a formula that takes into account five criteria: the number of breeding animals or breeding females; the percentage of pure-bred matings; the five-year trend in breed numbers; the number of breeders or herds; and the interval between generations of the animal.

The GEH also publishes, in conjunction with the Bund Deutscher Rassegeflügelzüchter, the German national association of poultry breeders, a separate list of the historic poultry breeds and colour varieties that were raised in Germany before 1930. The same levels of conservation risk are assigned as in the main red list.

== Endangered breeds ==
In 2014 the breeds listed were:

	Category I: extremely endangered	Category II: seriously endangered	Category III: endangered	Alert
Bees	European Dark Bee			
Cattle	Limpurger Murnau-Werdenfelser Glan Ansbach-Triesdorfer Angeln (old breeding standards)	Deutsches Shorthorn Original Braunvieh Rotes Höhenvieh Hinterwälder Pinzgauer	Gelbvieh (Frankenvieh) Deutsches Schwarzbuntes Niederungsrind	German Red Pied (dual-purpose) Vorderwälder
Chickens	Andalusian Augsburger Bergische Kräher Bergischer Schlotterkamm German Langshan Dominique Krüper Malines Minorca Sachsenhühn	Deutscher Sperber Ramelsloher Sundheimer	Brakel Deutsches Reichshuhn Lakenfelder Ostfriesische Möwen Thüringer Barthuhn	Deutsches Lachshuhn Barnevelder Hamburg Italiener Orpington Rheinländer Vorwerk Westfälische Totleger Wyandotte
Dogs	Altdeutscher Hütehund (Westerwälder Kuhhund) Großspitz	Mittelspitz	Deutscher Pinscher Altdeutscher Hütehund (South and Middle German types)	Mittelschnauzer (pepper-and-salt)
Ducks	Aylesbury Duck Pomeranian Duck	German Pekin Orpington Duck Rouen Duck		Hochbrutflugenten Indian Runner Duck Muscovy Duck
Geese	Deutsche Legegans Lippegans Bayerische Landgans Leinegans	Diepholzer Gans Emden Goose		Pomeranian Goose
Goats		Thuringian		
Horses	Rottaler Alt-Württemberger Leutstettener Dülmener Senner Arenberg-Nordkirchner Lehmkuhlener	Schleswig Coldblood	Black Forest Horse Ostfriesen and Alt-Oldenburger Rhenish German Coldblood	
Pigs	Angler Sattelschwein Deutsches Sattelschwein Bentheim Black Pied Rotbuntes Husumer Schwein	Schwäbisch Hällisches Schwein		
Rabbits	English Lop (German breeding standard)	Meissen Lop Angora Deutsche Großsilber Harlequin (Japaner) Luxkaninchen American Sable (Marderkaninchen)	Rheinische Schecke	
Sheep	Alpines Steinschaf Brillenschaf Leineschaf (original type) Weiße gehörnte Heidschnucke German Karakul Schwarzes Bergschaf	Braunes Bergschaf Weißes Bergschaf Waldschaf Merinolangwollschaf	Bentheimer Landschaf Weiße Hornlose Heidschnucke (Moorschnucke) Skudde Pomeranian Coarsewool Weißköpfiges Fleischschaf Merinofleischschaf	Coburger Fuchsschaf Rhönschaf
Turkeys		Bronzeputen Deutsche Puten	Cröllwitzer Turkey	

== See also ==
- Rare breed (agriculture)
- IUCN Red List
