= Gesellschaft zur Erhaltung alter und gefährdeter Haustierrassen =

Rare breed conservation association

- Abbreviation: GEH
- Formation: 1981
- Type: Eingetragener Verein
- Purpose: livestock conservation
- Headquarters: Witzenhausen, Hesse, Germany
- Official language: German
- Chairman: Karl-Heinrich Göpel
- Deputy chairman: Armin Friedrich; Karola Stier
- Treasurer: Thomas Schumacher
- Secretary: Antje Feldmann
- Main organ: Vorstand
- Website: www.g-e-h.de

The Gesellschaft zur Erhaltung alter und gefährdeter Haustierrassen (Note: Translatable as: 'the society for the conservation of old and endangered livestock breeds') or GEH is a German national association for the conservation of historic and endangered breeds of domestic animal.

== History ==
The organisation was founded on 5 December 1981 in the Rottal, in Lower Bavaria in southern Germany. This was eight years after the formation of the Rare Breeds Survival Trust in the United Kingdom, and a few years earlier than the formation of the Österreichische Nationalvereinigung für Genreserven landwirtschaftlicher Nutztiere and Arche Austria in Austria.

The association has about 2100 members. Since it was founded, no domestic livestock breed has become extinct in Germany. Its Arche-Hof ('ark-farm') project – a network of farms that undertake to keep a minimum of three endangered breeds under sustainable and non-intensive conditions – was established in 1995.

In 2021 the society conducted a survey of the measures taken by owners of flocks of sheep and goats against predation by wolves.

== Activities ==
The society co-operates with other national and international organisations for the conservation of biodiversity. It publishes an annual Rote Liste or red list of endangered breeds of livestock, which attributes one of four categories of conservation risk to domestic breeds of cattle, dogs, goats, horses, pigs, rabbits and sheep, of chickens, ducks, geese, pigeons and turkeys, and of bees. Some breeds from outside Germany are listed separately. The four levels of risk are:

- I: extrem gefährdet, 'extremely endangered'
- II: stark gefährdet, 'seriously endangered'
- III: gefährdet, 'endangered'
- Vorwarnstufe, "alert"

The risk level is calculated using a formula that takes into account five criteria: the number of breeding animals or breeding females; the percentage of pure-bred matings; the five-year trend in breed numbers; the number of breeders or herds; and the interval between generations of the animal.

The association also publishes, in conjunction with the Bund Deutscher Rassegeflügelzüchter, the German national association of poultry breeders, a separate list of the historic poultry breeds and colour varieties that were raised in Germany before 1930. The same levels of conservation risk are assigned as in the main red list.

== Endangered breed of the year ==
Since 1984 the society has each year designated one or more animal breeds as "endangered breed of the year". To date, these have been:

- 1984 Kärntner Brillenschaf or Jezersko–Solčava (sheep)
- 1986 Murnau-Werdenfelser (cattle)
- 1987 Schwäbisch Hällisches (pig)
- 1988 Schleswig Coldblood (horse)
- 1989 Waldschaf (sheep)
- 1990 Angeln Saddleback (pig)
- 1991 Rhönschaf (sheep)
- 1992 Hinterwälder (cattle)
- 1993 Thüringer Wald Ziege (goat)
- 1994 Westphalian (chicken)
- 1994 Diepholzer Gans (goose)
- 1994 Pomeranian (duck)
- 1995 Bentheim Black Pied (pig)
- 1996 Schleswig Coldblood (horse)
- 1997 Rotes Höhenvieh (cattle)
- 1998 Weiße gehörnte Heidschnucke (sheep)
- 1998 Altdeutscher Hütehund (dog)
- 1999 Mangalica (pig)
- 2000 Rottaler (horse)
- 2001 Bayerische Landgans (goose)
- 2001 Bergischer Kräher (chicken)
- 2001 Bergische Schlotterkamm (chicken)
- 2001 Krüper (chicken)
- 2002 Angeln (cattle), old breeding goals
- 2003 Großspitz and Mittelspitz (dog)
- 2003 Deutscher Pinscher (dog)
- 2004 Leutstettener (horse)
- 2004 European Dark Bee
- 2005 Bentheimer Landschaf (sheep)
- 2006 Deutsches Sattelschwein (pig)
- 2007 Murnau-Werdenfelser (cattle)
- 2008 Bronzepute (turkey)
- 2009 Alpines Steinschaf (sheep)
- 2010 Meißner Widder (rabbit)
- 2011 Limpurger (cattle)
- 2012 Deutscher Sperber (chicken)
- 2013 Leineschaf (sheep), original type
- 2014 Dülmener (horse)
- 2015 Deutsche Karakul (sheep)
- 2016 Original Braunvieh (cattle)
- 2016 Glan (cattle)
- 2016 Deutsches Schwarzbuntes Niederungsrind (German Black Pied, cattle)
- 2017 Deutsche Pekingente, German Pekin (duck)
- 2017 Orpington (duck)
- 2017 Warzenente (duck)
- 2018 Altwürttemberger (horse)
- 2019 Mangalica (pig)
- 2020 Pustertaler Sprinzen and Westerwälder Kuhhund (cattle, dog)
- 2021 Pustertaler Sprinzen and Westerwälder Kuhhund (cattle, dog)
- 2022 Walachenschaf (sheep)
- 2023 Walachenschaf (sheep)
- 2024 Angora, Lux and Marder (rabbit)
- 2025 Gelbvieh or Frankenvieh (cattle)
