= Arenberg-Nordkirchen =

Breed of horse

- Conservation status: FAO (2007): critical; GEH: Category I, extremely endangered
- Other names: Arenberg-Nordkirchner
- Country of origin: Germany
- Distribution: Westphalia

Traits
- Height: 132–140 cm or 141–148 cm

The Arenberg-Nordkirchen or Arenberg-Nordkirchner is a breed of small riding horse from north-west Germany. It was believed extinct in 1985, but in 1995 a small number were discovered, and since 1999 the population has remained stable at about 20–25 head. The Arenberg-Nordkirchen is in the highest-risk category of the Rote Liste (red list) of the Gesellschaft zur Erhaltung alter und gefährdeter Haustierrassen, the German national association for the conservation of historic and endangered domestic animal breeds.

== History ==
Germany does not have a long tradition of small horse breeding; the only native small horse is the Dülmener. From the early twentieth century ponies and small horses were imported, mostly from Great Britain, and some private individuals started breeding from them. The Arenberg-Nordkirchen breed was started in 1923 by the then Duke of Arenberg as a semi-feral herd on his estates in Nordkirchen, near Münster in Westphalia. It was based on the Dülmener, from which he intended to create a small and elegant riding horse. His stock was small, with no more than about 40 mares. In 1968 the entire herd was sold to a breeder from Nordkirchen, who introduced other pony and small horse blood to improve its riding-horse qualities. In the 1980s the herd was broken up, and the horses sold in Schleswig-Holstein and North Rhine-Westphalia, where they became part of the regional German Riding Pony populations.

The Arenberg-Nordkirchen was seen at the Berlin International Green Week in 1984, after which it was thought extinct. In 1995 a small number of surviving animals were found. Since 1999 the known population has remained stable at about 20–25 head. In 2007 there were four stallions and eighteen mares.

The Arenberg-Nordkirchen is classed as "Category I: extremely endangered" on the Rote Liste (red list) of the Gesellschaft zur Erhaltung alter und gefährdeter Haustierrassen, the German national association for the conservation of historic and endangered domestic animal breeds; it was listed as "critical" by the Food and Agriculture Organization of the United Nations in 2007. It is not among the 151 horse breeds reported by Germany to DAD-IS.

== See also ==
- List of German horse breeds
