= Augsburger =

German breed of domestic chicken

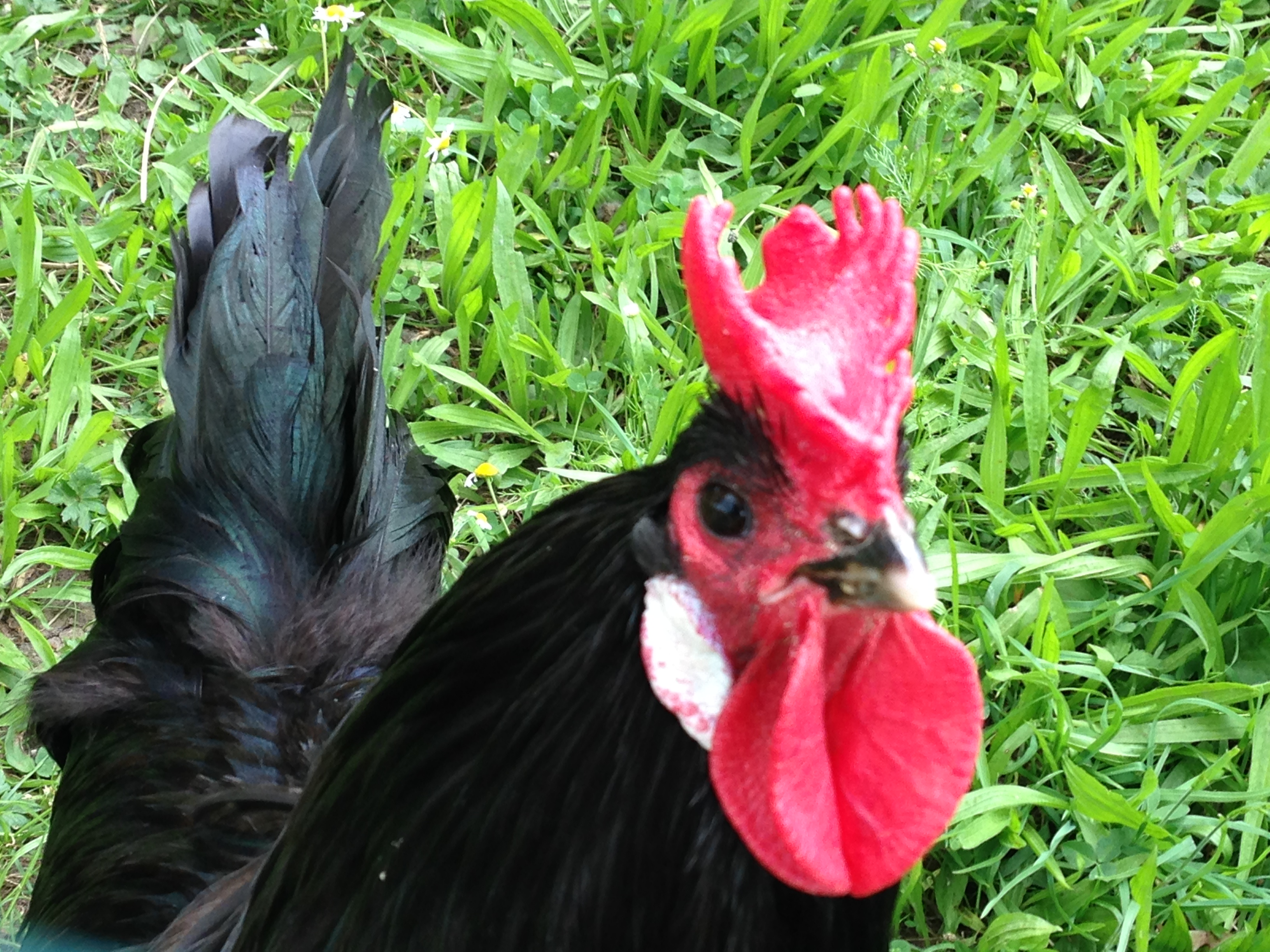
- Cock bird

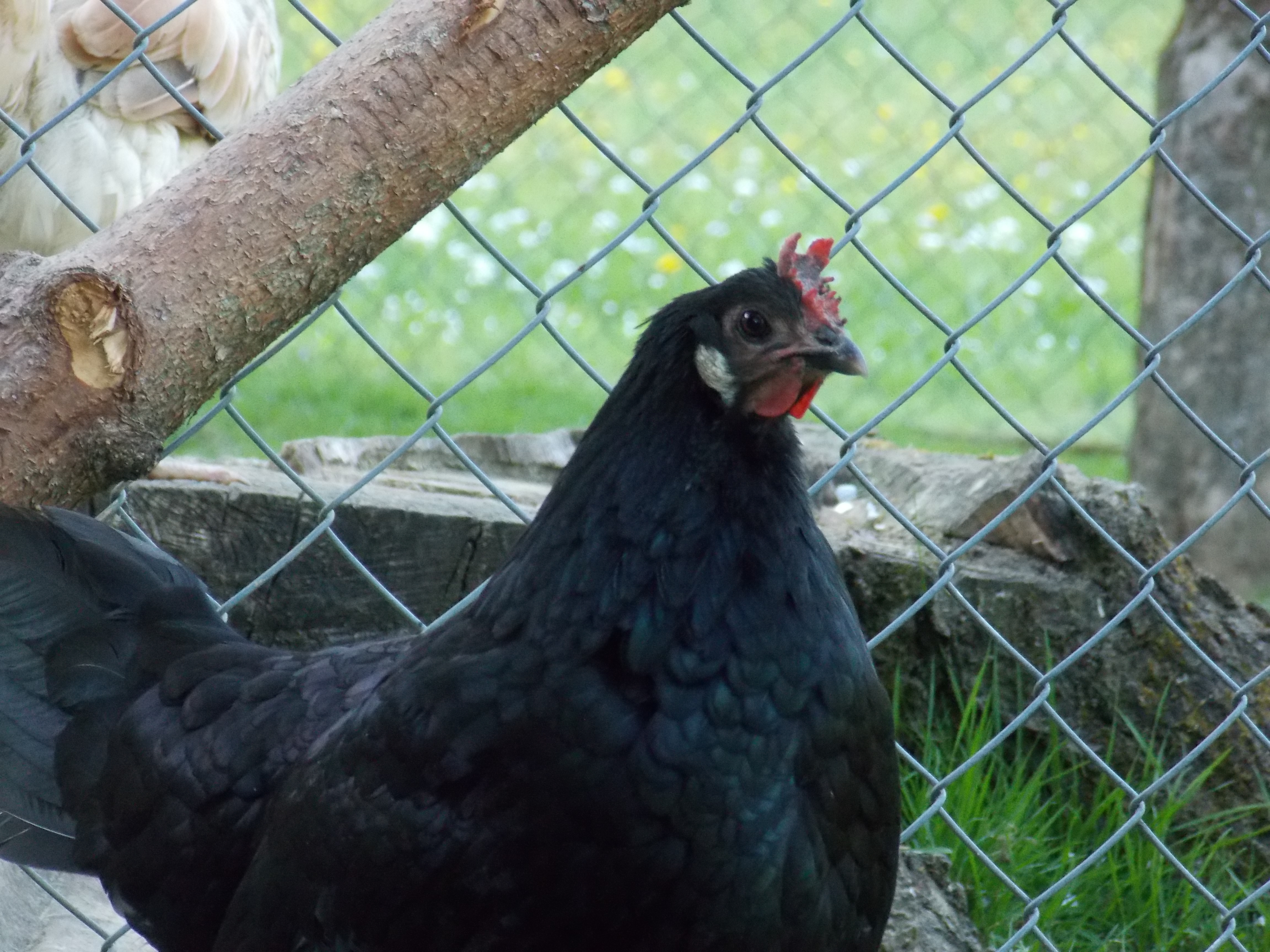
- Hen
- Conservation status: FAO (2007): not listed; GEH: I, extremely endangered; DAD-IS (2026): at risk/endangered
- Country of origin: Germany
- Distribution: Swabia; Black Forest
- Use: dual-purpose

Traits
- Weight: Male: Standard: 2.3–3.0 kg; Bantam: 900 g; Female: Standard: 2.0–2.5 kg; Bantam: 800 g
- Egg colour: white
- Comb type: rose

Classification
- EE: yes
- PCGB: not listed
- Chicken; Gallus gallus domesticus

The Augsburger (German pronunciation: [ˈaʊksˌbʊʁɡɐ]) is an endangered German breed of domestic chicken. It originates from the area of the city of Augsburg, in the Swabian region of the state of Bavaria, in southern Germany. It was bred in the nineteenth century, and derives mostly from the French La Flèche breed. It is the only chicken breed of Bavarian origin.

== History ==
The Augsburger was created by Julius Meyer, of the small town of Haunstetten, now part of the city of Augsburg, in the Swabian region of the state of Bavaria, in southern Germany. In 1870 or 1880, he cross-bred birds of the French La Flèche breed, prized for the quality of its meat, with an Italian breed or type – now extinct – named Lamotta, which was a good layer of eggs. The aim was to create a dual-purpose chicken which would combine both qualities. The first written description of the Augsburger is that of Jean Bungartz in 1885.

The Augsburger became popular, and spread to the area of Stuttgart and as far as the Black Forest. A breeders' association was formed in 1923 at Mühlhausen, in the Ruhr, but did not last long. Under the National Socialist régime the Augsburger was not officially recognised, and could not be exhibited at poultry shows. In 1938 a new breeders' association, the Sonderverein der Züchter des Augsburger Huhnes, was formed. From the 1960s the Augsburger began to suffer from competition from specialised high-productivity breeds, and its popularity waned.

In the twenty-first century the Augsburger is a rare breed. It is listed in category I, "extremely endangered", on the Rote Liste of the Gesellschaft zur Erhaltung alter und gefährdeter Haustierrassen. In 2005, 40 cocks and 164 hens were recorded; in 2009 there were 35 breeders with 64 cocks and 289 hens.

A bantam Augsburger was recognised in 1975.

== Characteristics ==
The Augsburger is well adapted to the climatic conditions of its area of origin, the Bavarian Plateau. The usual plumage colouring is black, with greenish lights; after the Re-unification of Germany in 1990, a new colour variant, blue-laced, was added to the standard for large fowl only – the bantam in recognised only in black.

The Augsburger has an unusual cup-shaped or rose-comb, similar to that of the Siciliana breed of Sicily, and quite unlike the v-shaped comb of the La Flèche breed. The earlobes are white.

In large fowl, body weights are in the range 2.0 to 2.5 kg for hens and 2.3 to 2.7 kg for cocks; the median weight for bantams is 800 g for hens, 900 g for cocks.

== Use ==
The Augsburger is a dual-purpose breed, with good meat qualities. Standard-sized hens lay approximately 180 white eggs per year, which average 58 g in weight; bantam hens lay about 120 eggs with an average weight of 38 g.
