= Murnau (disambiguation) =

Murnau may refer to:

- Murnau am Staffelsee, a town in Bavaria, Germany
  - Oflag VII-A Murnau, A German WW 2 POW camp located in the Bavarian town "Murnau am Staffelsee"
- F. W. Murnau (1888−1931), German film director
- Murnau-Werdenfels Cattle, an old, robust dairy breed from Upper Bavaria
- Lieutenant Murnau, a fictional music group
