= Blue Andalusian =

Spanish breed of chicken

Andalusian
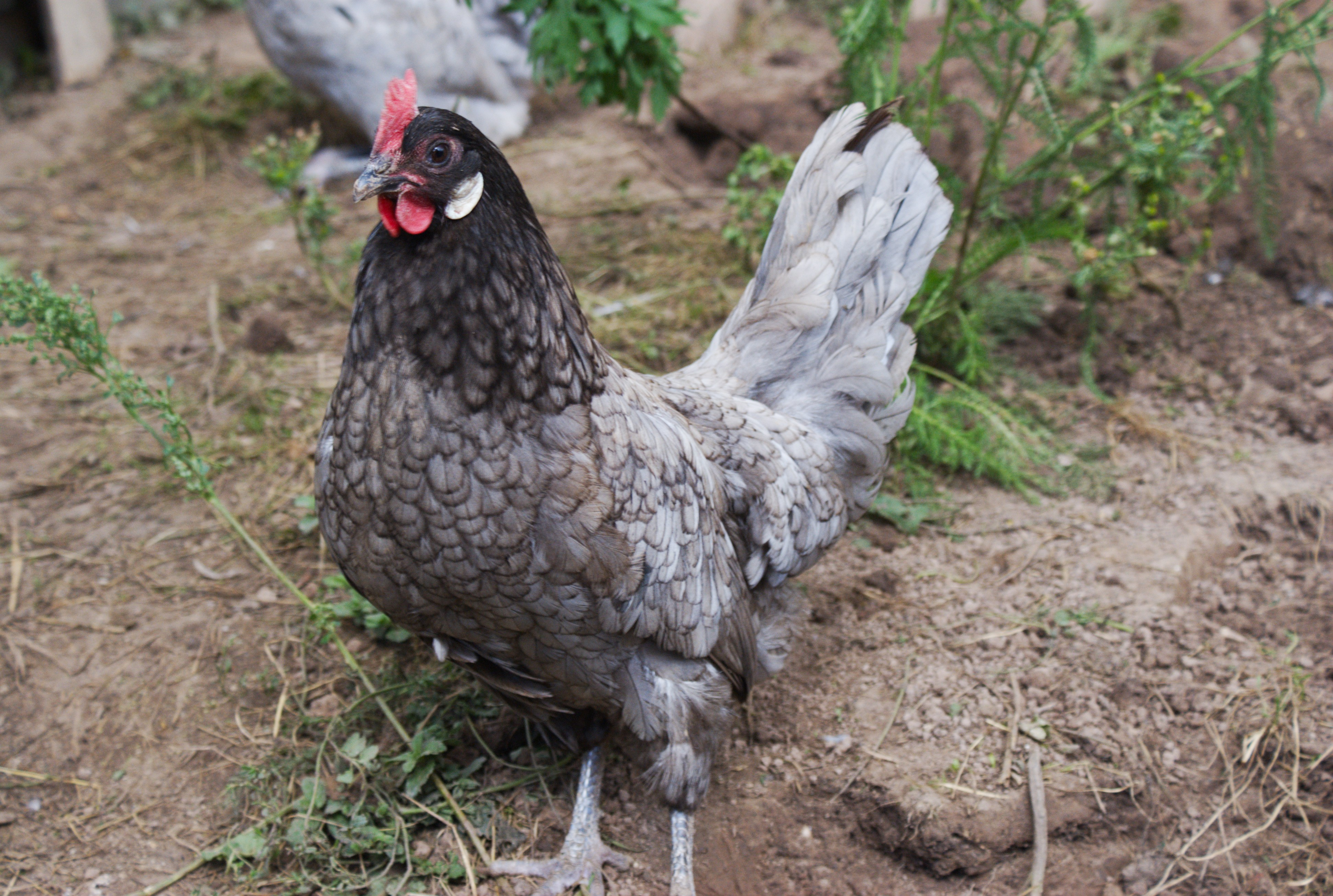
- A hen

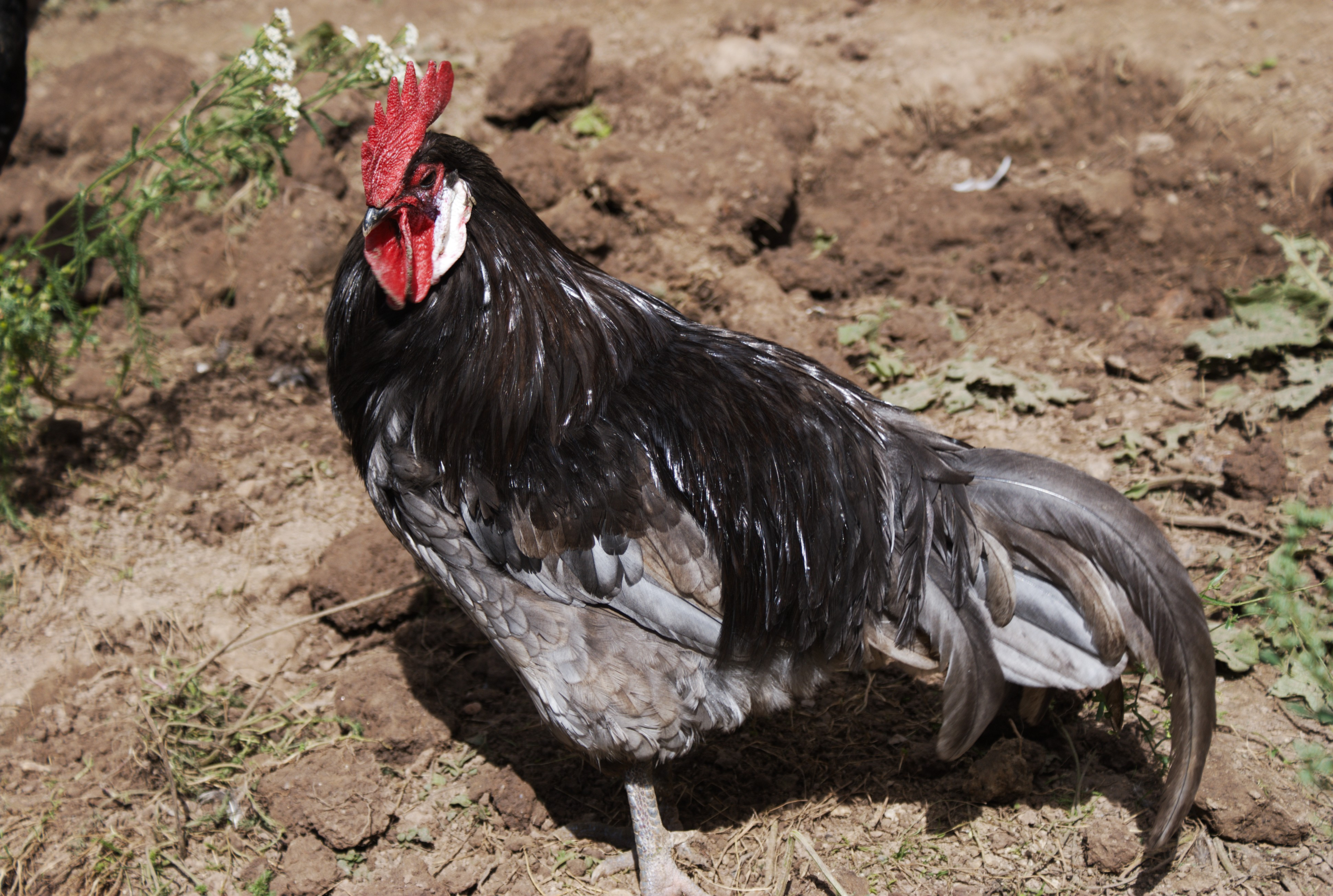
- A cock
- Conservation status: FAO (2007): endangered; DAD-IS (2025): at risk/endangered; GEH (2025): category 1, extrem gefährdet; RBST (2025): priority
- Other names: Andalusian; Andalusian Blue; Andaluza Azul
- Country of origin: Spain
- Distribution: Australia; Germany; Ireland; New Zealand; Spain; United Kingdom; United States
- Standard: Asociación Española de Criadores de Gallinas de Raza Andaluza Azul (page 6, in Spanish)

Traits
- Weight: Male: Standard: 3.2–3.6 kg; Bantam: 680–790 g; Female: Standard: 2.25–2.70 kg; Bantam: 570–680 g
- Egg colour: white
- Comb type: single

Classification
- APA: Mediterranean
- EE: yes
- PCGB: rare soft feather: light

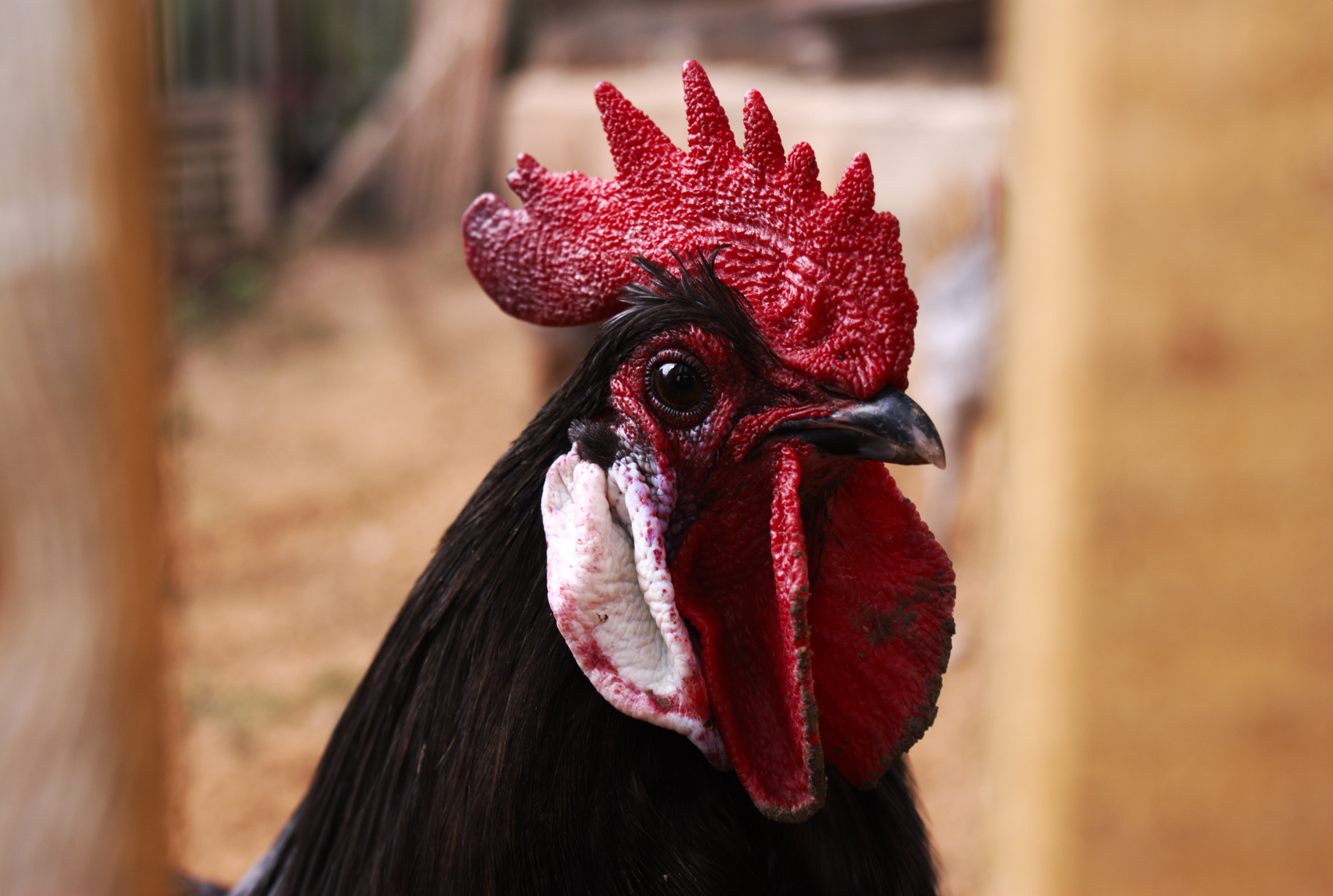
Head of a cock

The Blue Andalusian, Spanish: Andaluza Azul, is a Spanish breed of domestic chicken indigenous to the autonomous community of Andalusia in south-western Spain. It is distributed through much of the countryside of Córdoba and Seville, and is concentrated particularly in the area of Utrera, which is considered the heartland of the breed. In 2009 the total number of the birds in Spain was estimated at 10000.

A very different type of Andalusian, more intensely blue and with blue-laced plumage, was created in England from birds imported from Andalusia through selective breeding and cross-breeding with birds of other breeds.

== History ==
There is little information on the early history of the Andalusian. Blue chickens from Andalusia were imported to England no later than 1851. The creation of the "international" type of Andalusian, with blue-laced plumage, is attributed to the English, whether in Andalusia or in Britain. Two breeders in particular are thought to have started this process, which took many years: one named Coles, from Fareham in Hampshire, and a certain John Taylor of Shepherd's Bush in west London. Andalusians were shown at Baker Street in January 1853; the breed was not included in the original Standard of Excellence of William Bernhard Tegetmeier in 1865.

The birds reached the United States in the 1850s, and were included in the first edition of the Standard of Perfection of the American Poultry Association in 1874. The breed arrived in South America in 1870, and reached Germany in 1872. A bantam was created in the 1880s by Augusta Legge, countess of Dartmouth.

The Andaluza Azul was officially recognised by the Ministerio de Agricultura, Pesca y Alimentación, the Spanish ministry of agriculture, in 2007. A breed association – the Asociación Española de Criadores de Gallinas de Raza Andaluza Azul – was recognised by the Junta de Andalucía in 2015 as the official representative of the breed, and a breed standard and breeding programme were approved in the following year.

The conservation status of the Andalusian was listed by the Food and Agriculture Organization of the United Nations in 2007 as "at risk". In 2009 the total number of the birds in Spain was estimated at 10000. In 2025 the world-wide population was estimated to consist of 623 birds in six countries, of which only three reported population data; its conservation status in those countries was "at risk", while in Germany it was in category 1, extrem gefährdet ('extremely endangered'), on the Rote Liste of the Gesellschaft zur Erhaltung alter und gefährdeter Haustierrassen and in the United Kingdom was listed by the Rare Breeds Survival Trust as "priority".

== Characteristics ==
The slate-blue plumage of the Andalusian is caused by a dilution gene, which, in combination with the E gene for black plumage, produces partial dilution of the melanin which gives the black colour. Not all Andalusians are blue: birds with two copies of the gene have near-total dilution, and are off-white; birds with no copies have no dilution, and are black; those with one copy have partial dilution, and are blue. Blue birds occur, in Mendelian proportion, twice as often as each of the other colours. All are present in the population.

The earlobes of the Andalusian are smooth, white, and almond-shaped; the crest is single and of medium size, with five well-defined points. The skin is white and the legs and feet are black.

== Use ==
Andaluza Azul hens lay about 165 white eggs per year; eggs weigh 70–80 g. Blue-bred white hens lay the largest eggs.
