= Alabio duck =

Breed of domestic duck

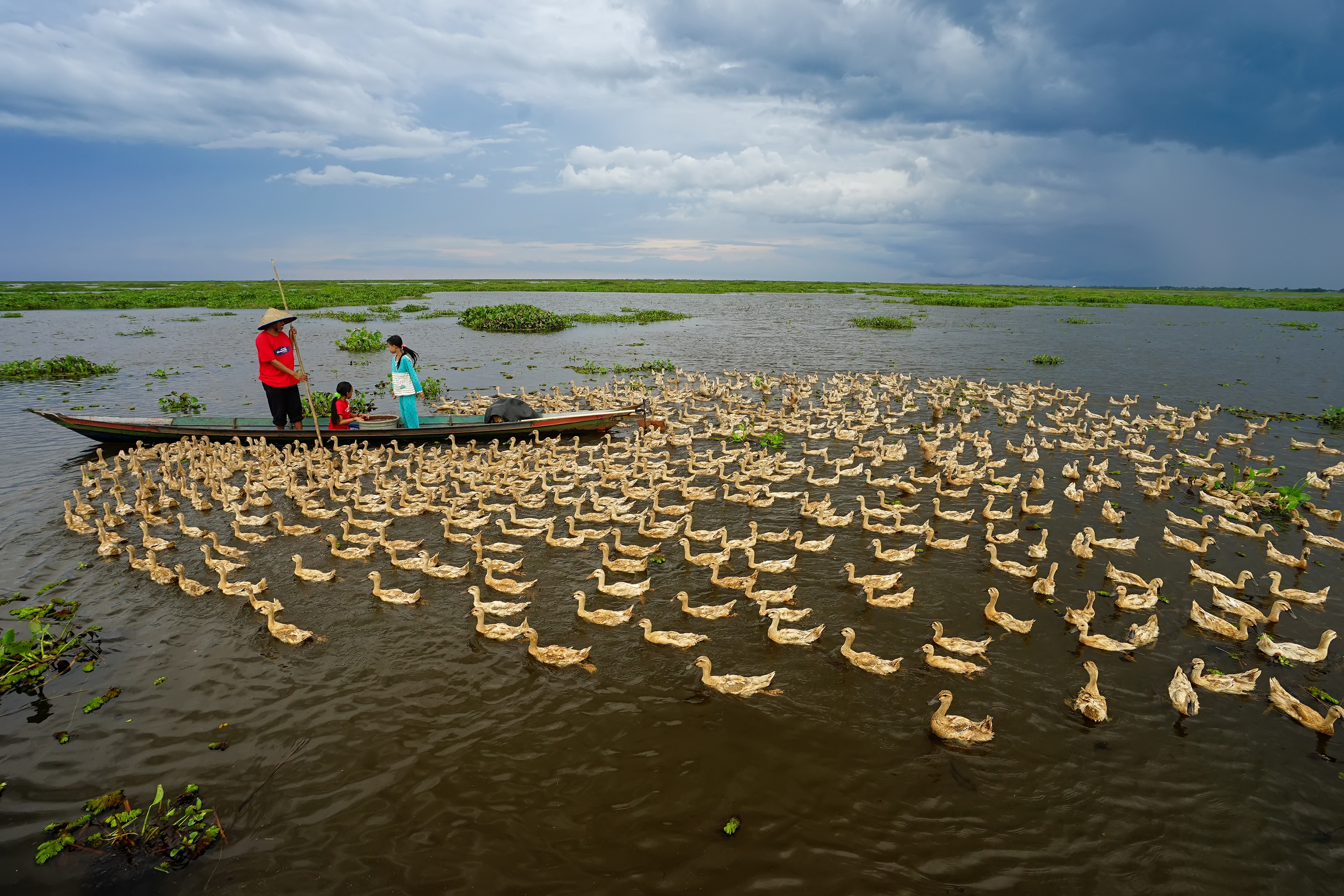
Alabio duck husbandry in the swamps of Sungai Buluh village, South Kalimantan

The Alabio duck (Indonesian: Itik Alabio) is an Indonesian breed of domestic duck from North Hulu Sungai Regency.

== Description ==
Named after Alabio by Saleh Pupso, the duck is a result of crossbreeding between local regional ducks and Pekins. With a population of 3.487 million individuals in 2006, it is a popular choice for farmers due to their great egg laying attributes as well as their large bodies which offers plenty of meat.

== See also ==
- List of duck breeds
