= Erzgebirge goat =

Breed of goat

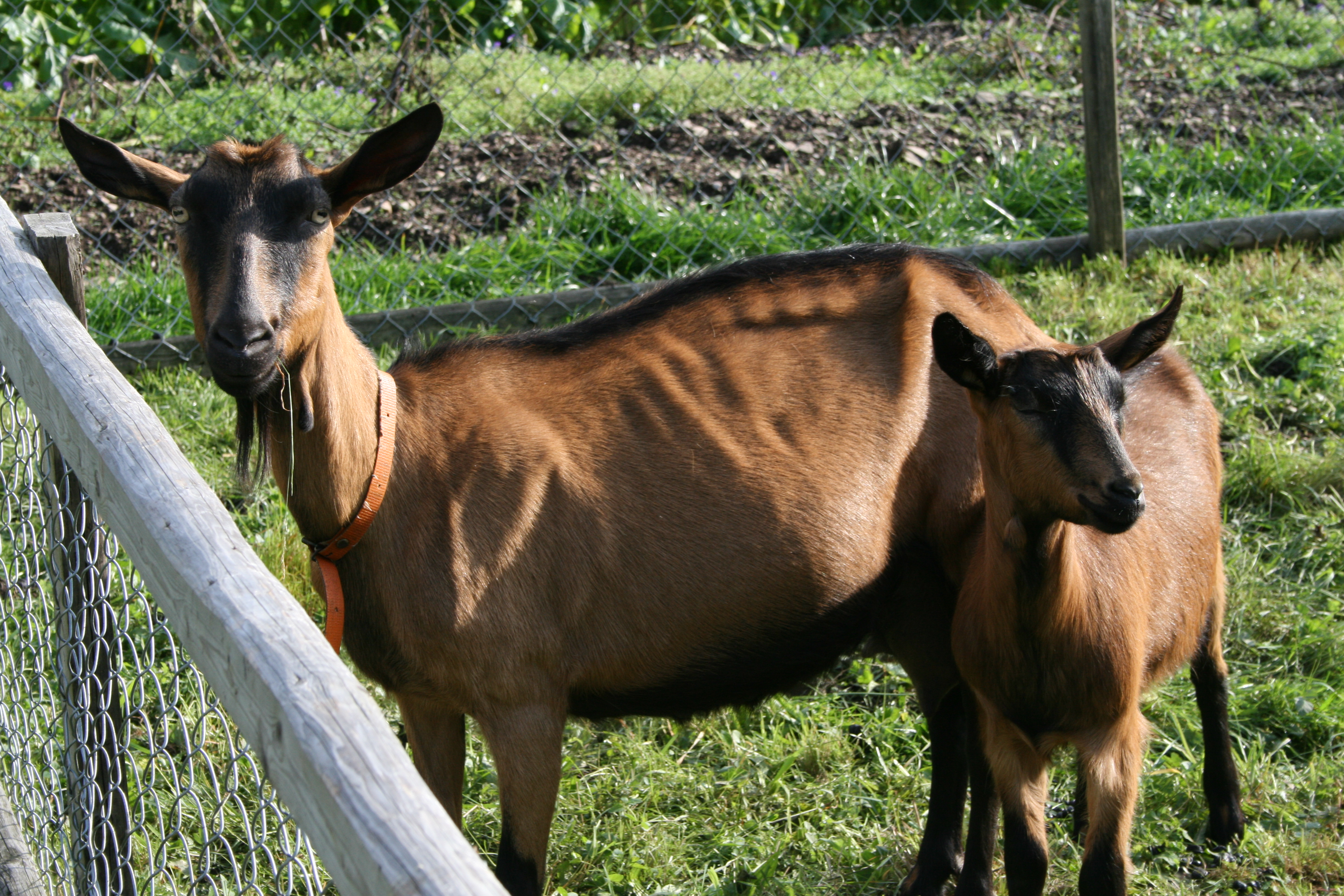
An Erzgebirge goat and kid

The Erzgebirge (German: Erzgebirgsziege) is a breed of goat native to the Saxony region of Germany. Erzgebirge goats are mostly hornless, and have a reddish-brown coat with black stripes on the face, back, and legs. Primarily used for milking, the breed is critically endangered.

== See also ==
- List of goat breeds
- Thuringian goat
