= German Pekin =

German breed of duck

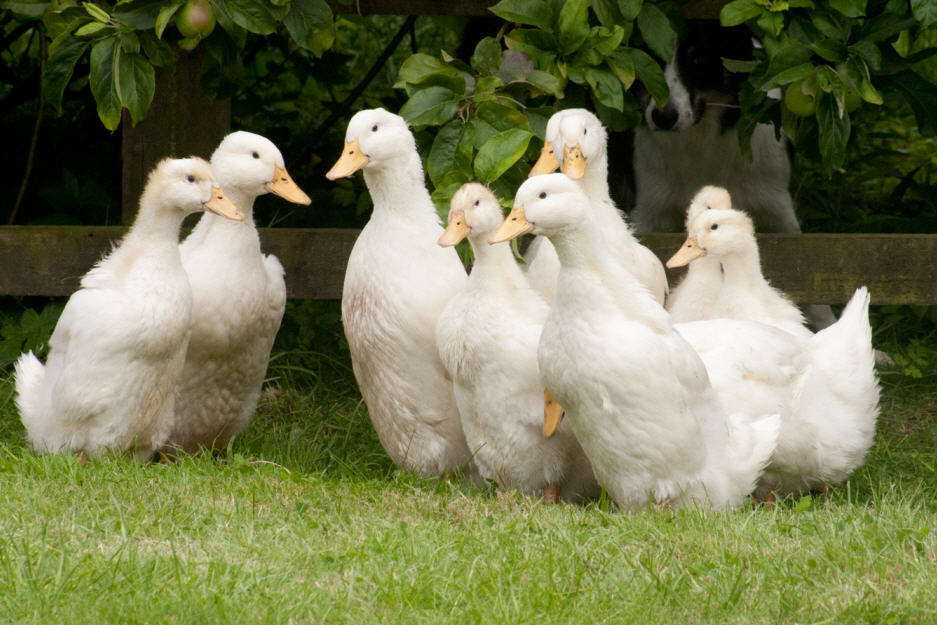
- Conservation status: FAO (2007): not listed; GEH: seriously endangered
- Other names: Pekin; Peking; White Pekin
- Country of origin: China; Germany
- Distribution: Europe
- Use: meat; eggs; showing

Traits
- Weight: Male: UK: 4.1 kg; Germany: 3.5 kg; Female: UK: 3.6 kg; Germany: 3.0 kg
- Egg colour: white or tinted

Classification
- EE: yes
- PCGB: heavy

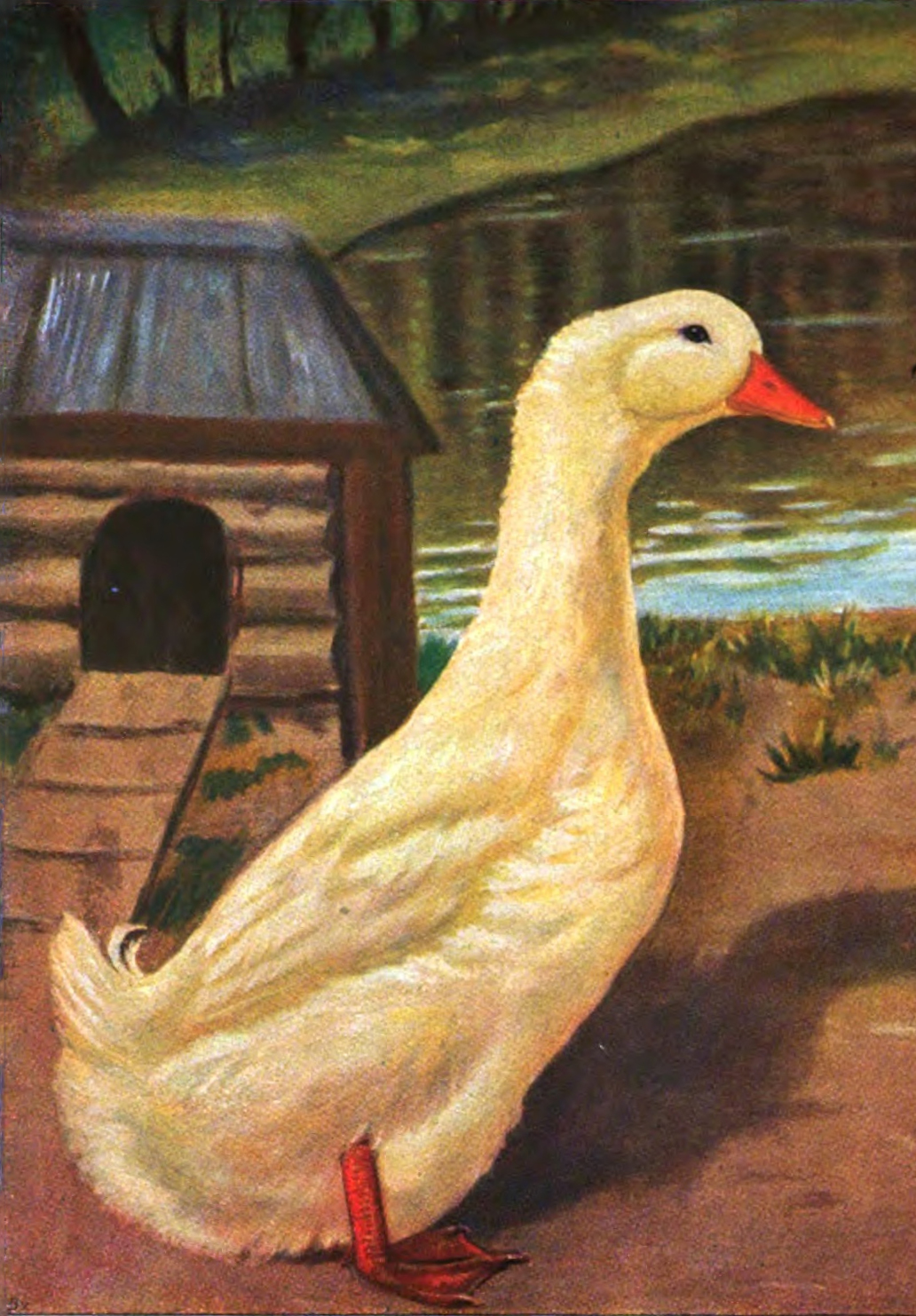
A drake, illustration from Bruno Dürigen, Die Geflügelzucht, 1923

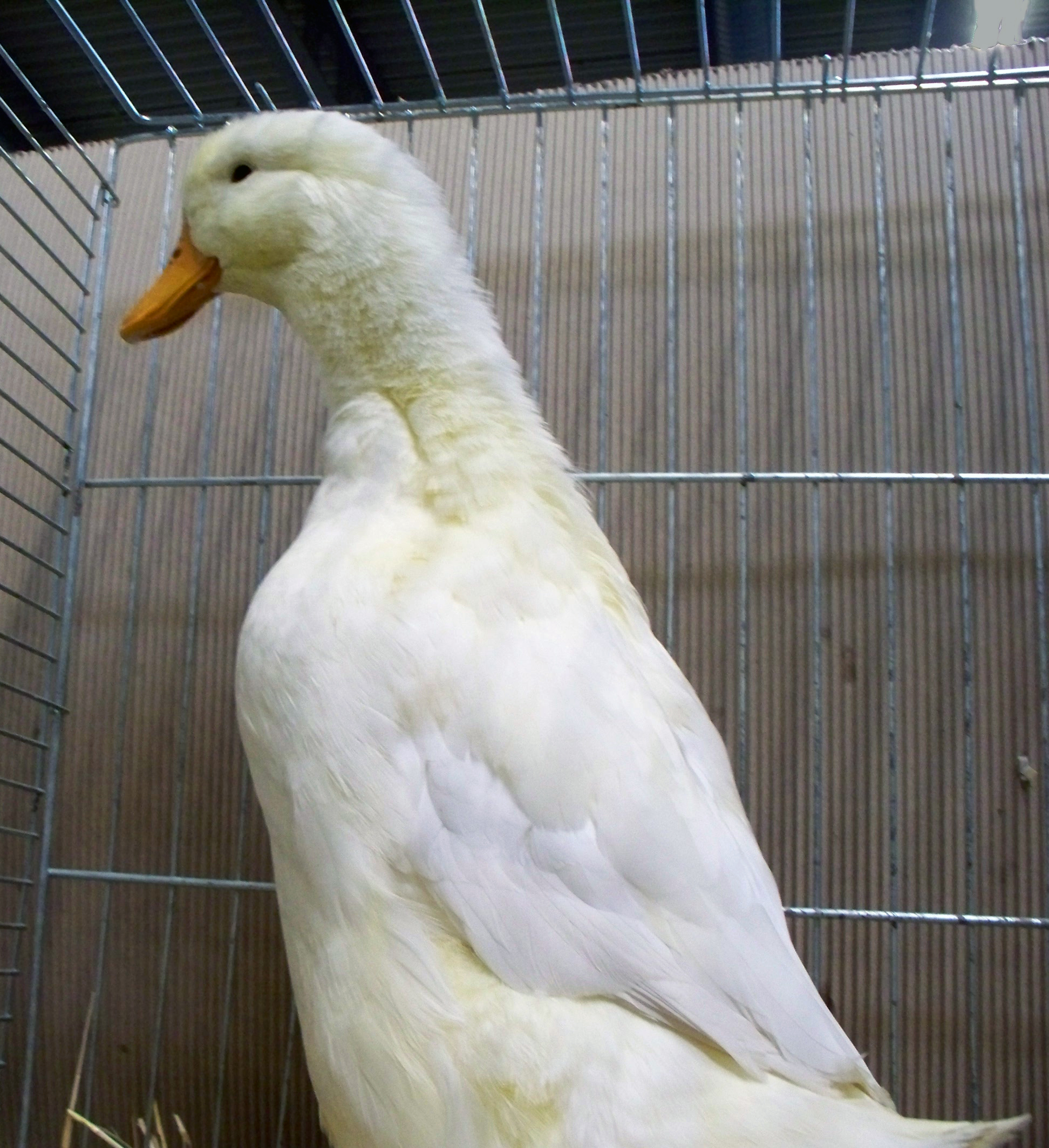
A duck

The German Pekin, German: Deutsche Pekingente, is a European breed of domestic duck. It is commonly called simply Pekin or White Pekin. It is a different breed from the American Pekin, which is also commonly known by the same names. It was bred in Europe from birds originating in China and Japan and is distributed in many European countries.

== History ==
The mallard was probably domesticated in China before 1000 AD. Force-feeding of ducks is documented from the tenth century, under the Five Dynasties. Chinese people were sophisticated breeders of ducks. Among several breeds they created was one named shi-chin-ya-tze, or roughly "ten-pound duck".

In 1872 some birds of this type were imported to the United Kingdom by Walter Steward; others were taken to the United States by James E. Palmer, where they gave rise to the American Pekin breed. Some soon reached Germany from the UK, possibly via France.

In Germany the Chinese ducks were cross-bred with upright white ducks brought from Japan by Dutch ships, resulting in birds with a steep body angle; those taken to the United States were crossed with Aylesbury birds, which led to birds with a more horizontal stance. In Britain as in Germany, breeders in the early twentieth century tended to select for an upright body position. The modern British breed derives mostly from birds imported from Germany from about 1970.

In 2017 the German Pekin was listed as "seriously endangered" in the Rote Liste of the Gesellschaft zur Erhaltung alter und gefährdeter Haustierrassen, a German national association for the conservation of historic and endangered domestic animal breeds. In 2025 its conservation status in Germany was listed in DAD-IS as "at risk/endangered",, while in the United Kingdom it was "not at risk".

== Characteristics ==
The Pekin is heavily feathered; the plumage is creamy white with a yellowish tinge. The beak is short and orange-coloured. The body is broad and heavy, and is held almost vertical. In the United Kingdom, drakes weigh approximately 4.1 kg and ducks about 3.6 kg, while in Germany drakes weigh approximately 3.5 kg and ducks about 3 kg.

== Use ==
The Pekin was intended to be a table bird, reared for its meat. In Germany it has not been kept for agricultural production since about the time of the Second World War, and is primarily a show bird. Ducks lay about 80 eggs per year; the eggs weigh approximately 80 g.
