= Altwürttemberger =

Horse breed from Germany

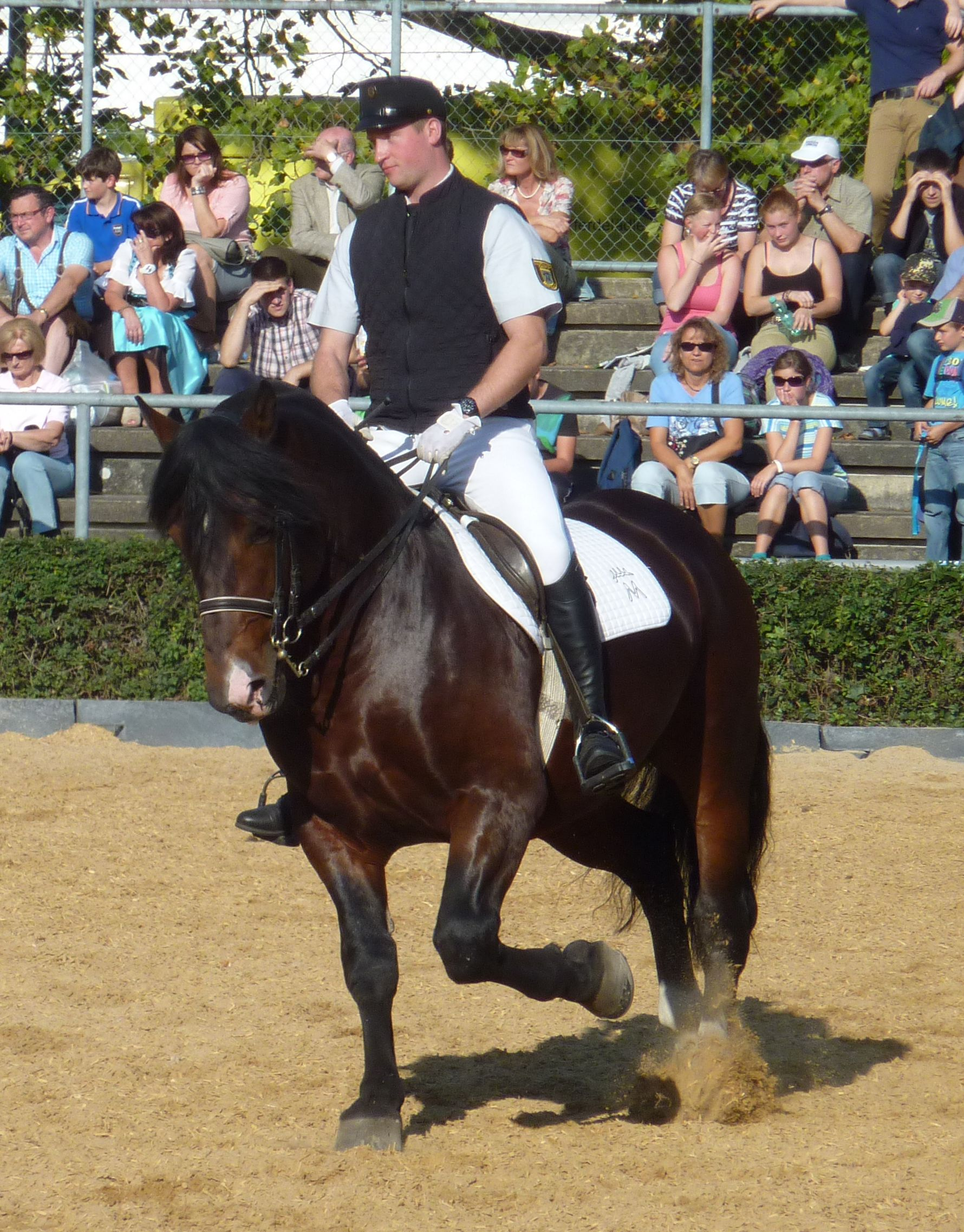
- Bay Altwürttemberger, saddled
- Country of origin: Germany, Bade-Wurtemberg
- Use: Straight profile, docile and calm, saddle, light traits, farm work.

Traits
- Height: 15.25 to 16.25 hands (62.5 to 66.5 inches, 159 to 169 cm)
- Color: Mostly chestnut, bay, seal brown, black
- Color: Mostly chestnut, bay, seal brown, black
- Distinguishing features: Cob

The Altwürttemberger (German : Alt-Württemberger, meaning "old wurtemberg") is a horse breed from Baden-Württemberg, Germany. With origins dating back to the 16th century, the breed originated at Germany's oldest stud farm, Marbach. The Altwürttemberger is mainly descended from the Anglo-Norman founder stallion Faust. Its studbook was created in 1895, and the breed was established at the beginning of the following century. Until the Second World War, this horse was used for agricultural work, then declined for lack of use. A small number of specimens were saved with the formation of an association in 1988.

The altwürttemberger is a solid, heavy cob and warmblood horse, suitable for both saddling and pulling. Due to its very low numbers, between 50 and 60 individuals in the 2010s, it is considered a rare breed in critical danger of extinction. The Gesellschaft zur Erhaltung alter und gefährdeter Haustierrassen or GEH (Society for the Conservation of Old and Endangered Domestic Breeds) recognized it as an endangered German breed on 2018.

== History ==
Its name means "old Württemberg" in English. In German, the name "Altwürttemberger" is referenced by the FAO, with the English translation "Altwuertemberg". The breed, whose origins date back to the 16th century with the establishment of the first stud farm in Baden-Württemberg, originated from the private breeding of Eberhard I, Duke of Württemberg, who crossed local mares with his Arabian stallions. In 1552, this breeding was transferred to the Marbach stud farm, under the direction of Christoph, Duke of Württemberg. The livestock was dispersed during the Thirty Years' War, and breeding did not resume in earnest until the early 18th century. Crossbreeding of native mares continued with Arabian, Barb, East Frisian, Turkish, Hungarian, Caucasian and Suffolk stallions. Breeding was first regulated in 1687. Duke Louis of Württemberg introduced Andalusian and Neapolitan horses.

The Napoleonic Wars led to the loss of the breed's best horses to the French. The stock was subsequently crossed with Arabs, Thoroughbreds, Trakehners and Anglo-Norman horses. In 1866, the Rossparlament set the breeding objective for Baden-Württemberg, which was to produce half-blood workhorses. The Anglo-Norman stallion Faust, born in Normandy in 1885 or 1886, became the founder of the breed, which was subsequently established through inbreeding. Thus, the Altwürttemberger is essentially a mixture of old Baden-Württemberg horse strains and the Anglo-Norman.

The studbook was created in 1895, in Stuttgart. It is still active today. By the beginning of the 20th century, the breed was established and identifiable. A robust horse, the Altwürttemberger was assigned to agricultural work on the farms of its region. Until the 1960s, breeding was concentrated in the Württemberg Oberland and Hohenzollern, but also in the regions around Ludwigsburg, Leonberg, Herrenberg, Esslingen and Göppingen.

The breed declined with the motorization of farming activities, and due to the popularity of the sport horse, from the 1950s and 1960s onwards. By 1986, only 21 horses remained in the German studbook. In February 1988, supporters of the breed got together in extremis to form the Erhaltung des Altwürttemberger Pferdes e.V., or "Association for the Conservation of the Altwürttemberger Horse". The latter adopted a rule of preserving animals with at least 50% traceable origin from old Württemberger bloodlines, but due to the very low number of remaining animals and the obligation to foal 20-year-old mares to preserve the breed, this rule was later relaxed. By 1991, only 23 females remained. The Altwürttemberger has been internationally recognized as a critically endangered German animal breed since 1993. Between 1988 and 1994, the number of new births increased steadily. A drop in numbers occurred between 1999 and 2000, when the herd fell sharply from 76 to 45 animals. In 2013, due to its close genetic relationship with the Ostfriesen / Alt-Oldenburger and the Saxon-Thuringian Heavy Warmblood, the Altwürttemberger was included in the Heavy Warmblood breed group.

== Description ==
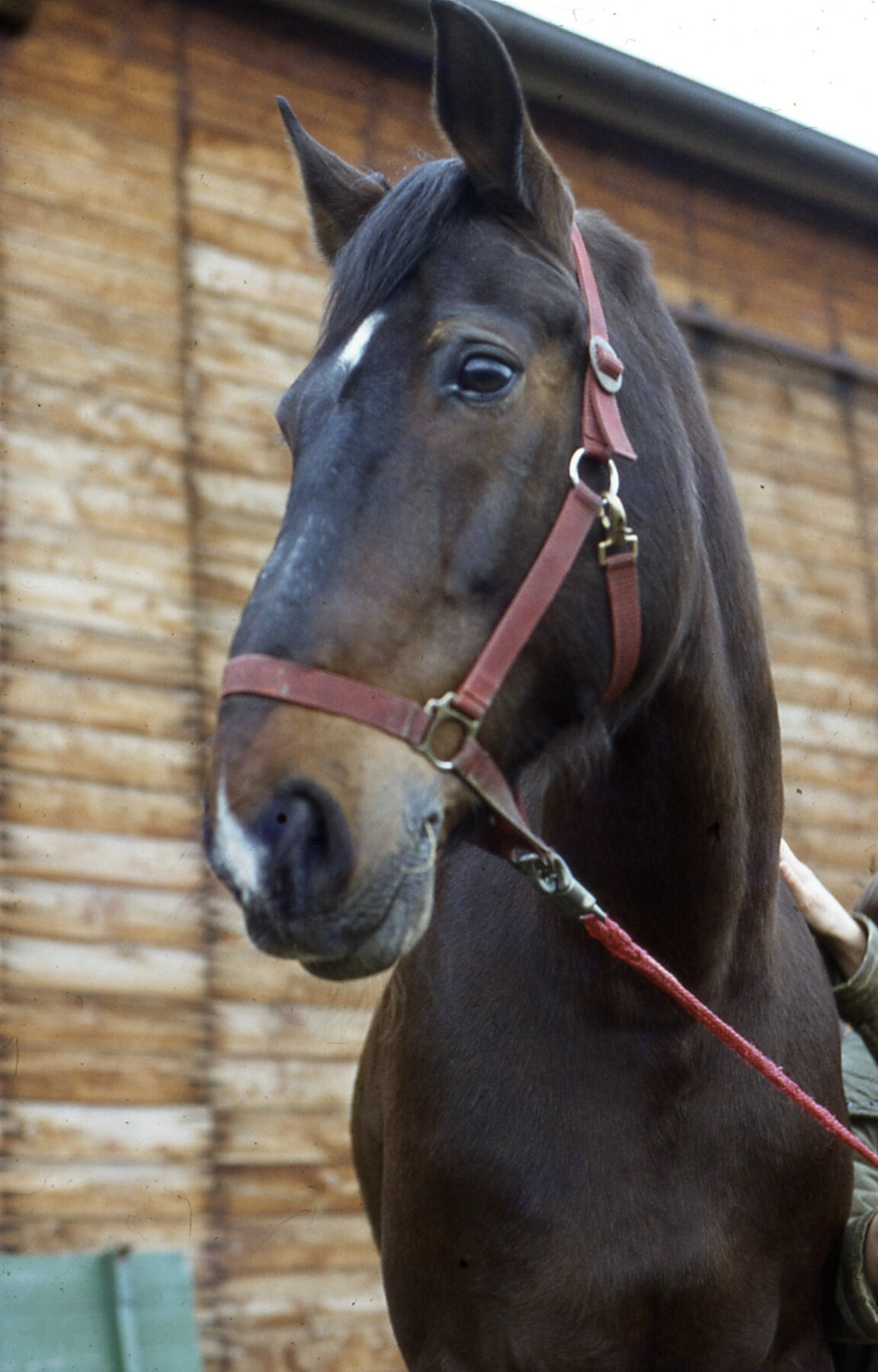
Dark bay Altwürttemberger's head

It is a cob-type horse, belonging to the "heavy warmblood" category of older half-blood breeds, of which lighter, more recent models exist. Medium-sized, according to the German breed association and the Delachaux guide, their height ranges from 1.55 m to 1.65 m. The average height recorded for females in the DAD-IS database is 1.60 m. Stallions must measure less than 1.70 m. Bonnie Lou Hendricks' encyclopedia (University of Oklahoma, 2007) gives an average of 1.65 m.

The head is lean, moderately heavy, with a sufficiently expressive eye, of straight profile with good width between the eyes, of medium length, rather square, with straight ears. The neck is proportionate, the withers raised, the dorsal-lumbar line short and solid. The rump is slightly sloping, the tail well set, the thorax deep and broad. The shoulder is long, sloping and muscular. The legs are strong, with good muscles, a sturdy muzzle and solid hooves.

=== Coat ===
The most common colors are bay, Seal brown, chestnut and black. "White" is mentioned in DAD-IS9, but more likely refers to gray, which is accepted in the breed. White markings are possible.

=== Temperament and gait ===
Reputed to be docile and quiet, Altwürttembergers are appreciated for their power and stamina. The walk is ample, the trot energetic.

=== Selection ===
Selection is carried out by two organizations, the Deutsche Reiterliche Vereinigung e.V. and the Pferdezuchtverband Baden-Württemberg e. V. In 2010, Erhaltung des Altwürttemberger Pferdes e.V. had around 110 active members. Animals must always have at least 30% of their origins traceable to old Württemberger bloodlines. Descendants of the stallion Faust are the pillars of this conservation breeding program. In addition, the Marbach stud has semen reserves from a Württemberger stallion.

== Use ==
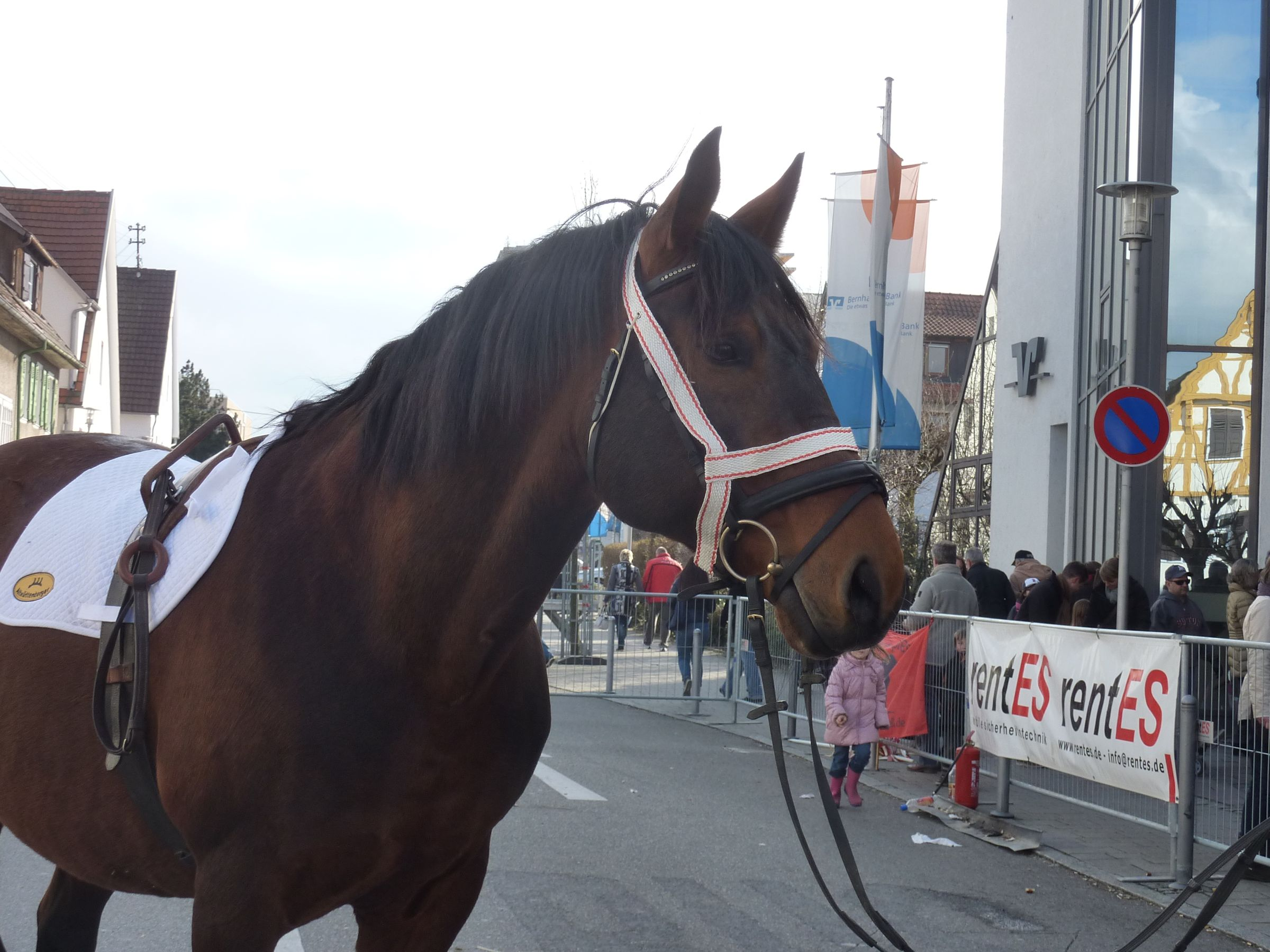
Saddled Altwürttemberger.

Once a multi-purpose agricultural workhorse, this breed of Germanic horse is now appreciated for light traction and as a horsecar, particularly for agricultural and leisure purposes, as well as for more sporting riding. The breed association promotes its use as a leisure and family horse, as well as for equine-assisted therapy and show jumping.

== Breeding distribution ==
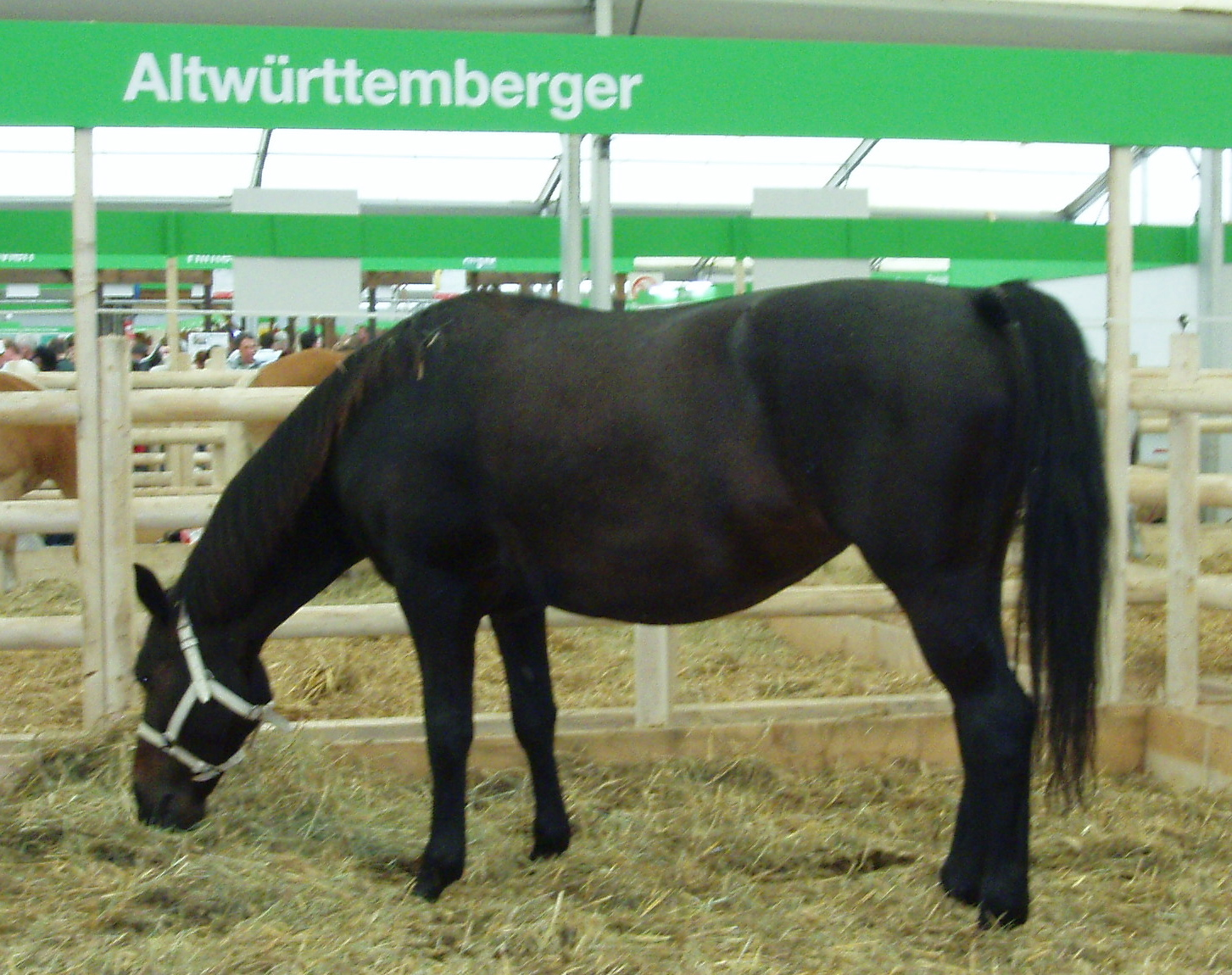
Seal brown Altwürttemberger in the exhibition Landwirtschaftliches Hauptfest in 2006

DAD-IS lists the Altwürttemberger as a rare local German breed; more precisely, it is indigenous to the south of the country. Its level of threat is considered "critically endangered" by the FAO, in 2007. The number of stallions recorded in DAD-IS in 2016 was just 56. In 2024, 8 stallions were active, for 65 mares. Only 4 foals were born in 2014. The breed is classified as "extremely vulnerable" on the Red List of the Gesellschaft zur Erhaltung alter und gefährdeter Haustierrassen (Society for the Conservation of Old and Endangered Domestic Breeds). The latter named the Altwürttemberger endangered animal breed of the year 2018. To mark the occasion, the breed was presented at the International Green Week in Berlin, January 19 to 28, 2018.

It is locally recognized as an endangered heritage specific to the German region of Baden-Württemberg. Close cooperation between breeders, the breed association and the Marbach stud aims to coordinate efforts to safeguard the breed. The breed is also eligible for German financial aid for the preservation of endangered breeds (2015).

== See also ==
- Wuertemberg
- Aegidienberger
- Bavarian warmblood
