= Alabio =

Alabio was a district in North Hulu Sungai, Kalimantan Selatan, Indonesia until administrative reforms after the Indonesian independence. The Alabio duck gets its name from this region.
