= Husum Red Pied =

Breed of domestic pig

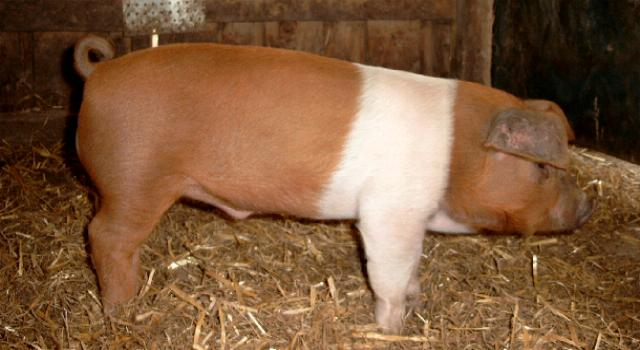
- Conservation status: FAO (2007): critical; DAD-IS (2024): unknown
- Other names: Rotbunte(s) Husumer (Schwein); German Red Pied; Rotbunte(s) Schwein; Rotbunte Schleswig-Holsteiner
- Nicknames: Danish Protest Pig; Husumer Protestschwein; Husum protestsvin; Rotbuntes Husumer Protestschwein
- Country of origin: Germany

Traits
- Weight: Male: 350 kg (750 lb); Female: 300 kg (650 lb)
- Height: Male: 92 cm (36 in); Female: 85 cm (33 in)

Notes
- red variant of the Angeln Saddleback

The Husum Red Pied or Rotbunte Husumer is a rare Danish breed of domestic pig. It is a red pig with a white belt or saddle which includes the forelegs, so the head, neck, rump and hind parts are red; it is considered a colour variant of the Angeln Saddleback. The name derives from that of the town of Husum on the coast of Nordfriesland in northern Schleswig-Holstein, where pigs of this kind are documented from the late nineteenth century.

The white stripe on the pig is intended to invoke the flag of Denmark

At this time, when the area was under Prussian rule, display of the Danish flag was not permitted; according to legend, some Danish separatist farmers craftily bred the pigs to possess a white stripe to resemble the Nordic cross in the flag, and it acquired the nickname Danish Protest Pig.

== History ==
The Husumer Rotbunte is a red variant of the Angeln Saddleback; its full official name is Deutsches Sattelschwein – Abteilung Rotbuntes Husumer Schwein, 'German Saddleback Pig – Red Pied Husumer section'.

In 1864, during the Second Schleswig War, Prussia declared victory over Danish lands and instituted new laws forbidding the display of the Danish flag. According to legend, separatist farmers bred the pig to resemble the Nordic cross in the flag. They were unable to breed the horizontal stripe but they succeeded in creating what culturally Danish people celebrated as the Danish Protest Pig (German: Husumer Protestschwein, Danish: Husum Protestsvin). It was recognized as a breed in 1954; the last time a sow with piglets was seen at a show was at Rendsburg in 1968, and thereafter it was thought to be extinct.

Pigs corresponding to the description of the breed were seen again in Berlin in 1984, and a breed association, the Interessengemeinschaft Rotbuntes Husumer Schwein, was formed in that year. In 2007 the breed society was the Schweineherdbuchzucht Schleswig-Holstein e.V..

Breeding populations exist in the Berlin Zoological Garden, the Hanover Zoo, the Tierpark Arche Warder near Kiel, in the ZOOM Erlebniswelt Gelsenkirchen, in Dalmsdorf (Mecklenburg), Hof Lütjensee, and on the Archehof Blumencron. The Dortmund Zoo and the Tierpark Krüzen house small populations too. At the moment, around 140 specimens are alive worldwide. The German federal state of Schleswig-Holstein supports preservation of the breed for its cultural value.

== Characteristics ==
Husumer boars reach a height of about 92 cm and weigh up to 350 kg; sows are about 85 cm in height, with a weight of some 300 kg. It is a red pig with a white belt or saddle; the saddle includes the forelegs, so the head, neck, rump and hind parts are red.
