= Schleswig Coldblood =

Breed of draught horse from Germany/Denmark

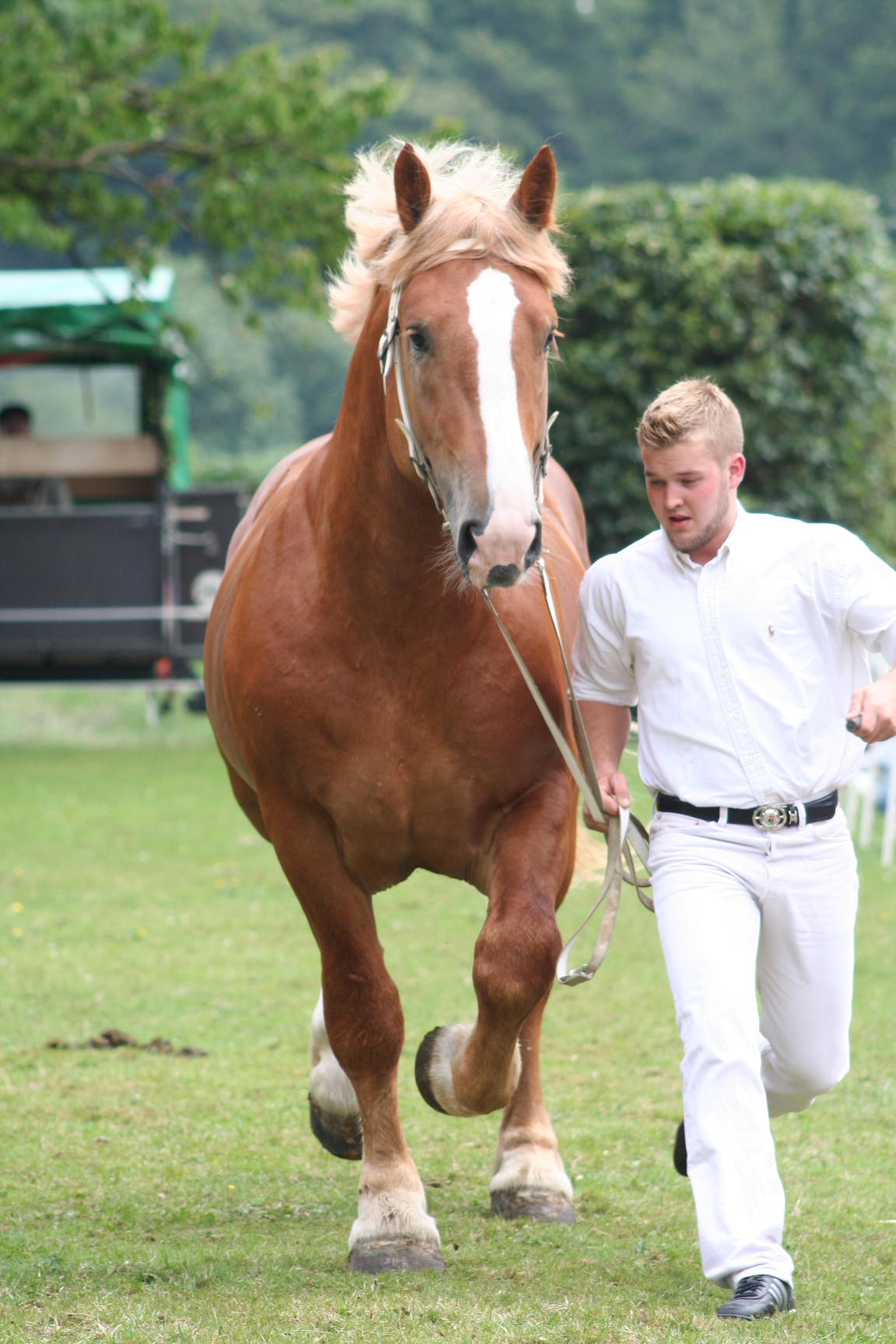
- Conservation status: FAO (2007): endangered; GEH: Category II, "seriously endangered"
- Other names: German: Schleswiger Kaltblut; Danish: Slesvigsk Koldblod
- Country of origin: Denmark; Germany
- Distribution: Schleswig-Holstein; Lower Saxony

Traits
- Height: 154–162 cm; Male: average 158 cm; Female: average 156 cm
- Colour: usually flaxen chestnut
- Distinguishing features: Medium-sized draught horse

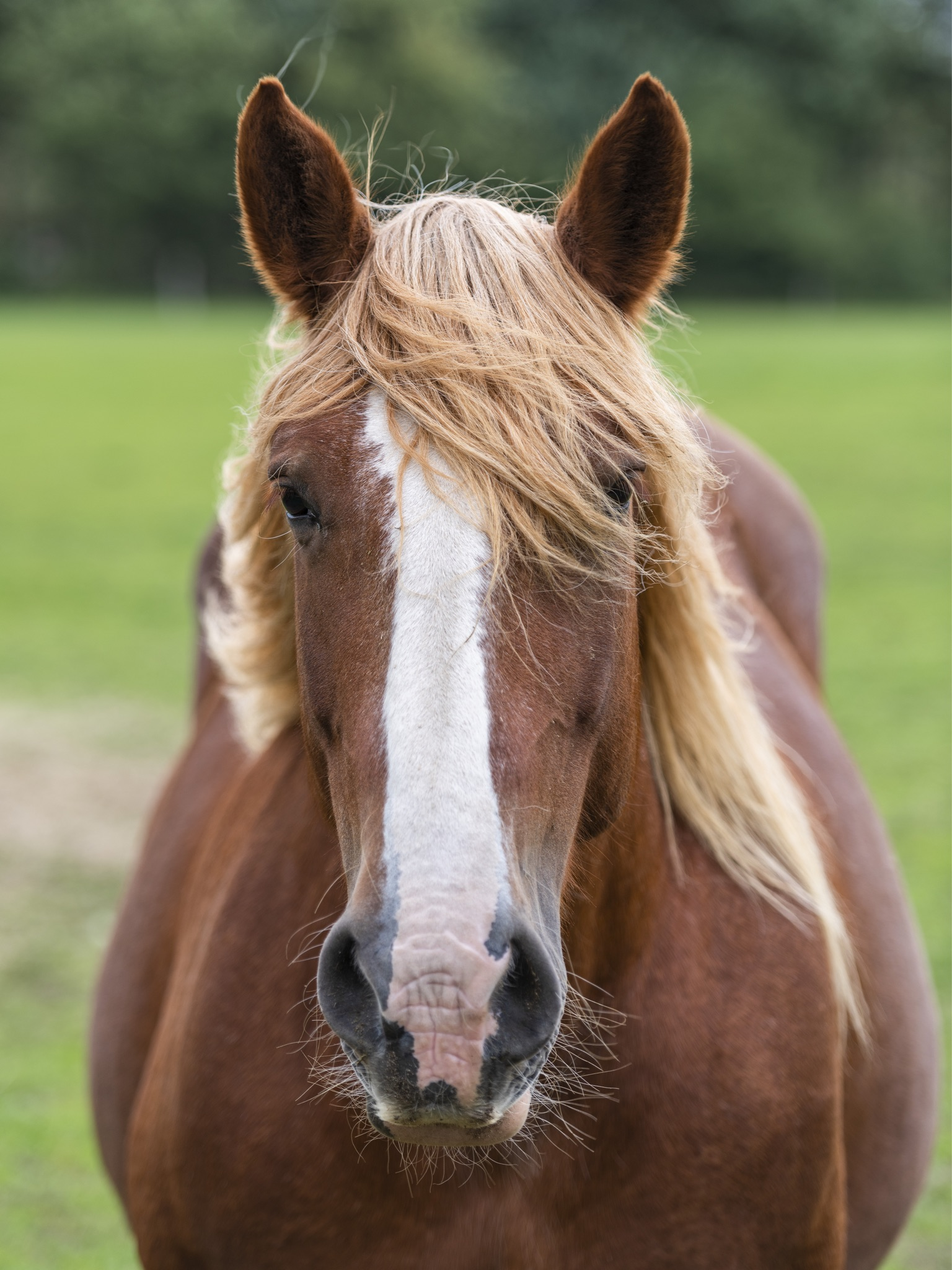
Close-up of head

The Schleswig Coldblood (German: Schleswiger Kaltblut, Danish: Slesvigsk Koldblod) is a breed of medium-sized draught horse originally from the historic Schleswig region of the Jutland Peninsula, which today is divided between modern Denmark and Germany, and from which its name derives. It is found primarily in the northern German state of Schleswig-Holstein, and also, in smaller numbers, in Lower Saxony. It shares the origins, ancestry and much of the history of the Danish Jutland breed, and shows some similarity to the British Suffolk Punch. It is used in agriculture and forestry, and to draw coaches and wagons.

== History ==
The Schleswig Coldblood originates from the area of the Duchy of Schleswig, in the southern part of the Jutland Peninsula, and has its origins in the Jutland horse. In about 1860, an imported English stallion, Oppenheim LXII, either a pure-bred or a part-bred Suffolk Punch, was introduced, and became the foundation stallion of the breed. In 1888, the breeding of warmbloods and coldbloods was separated, and in 1891, various associations of coldblood breeders in Schleswig were brought together in the Verband der Schleswiger Pferdezuchtvereine, and systematic breeding began. The brand V.S.P in an oval on the off hindleg was chosen to identify registered horses and is still used today.

In 1893, the stallion Aldrup Munkedal 839 was born, a son of Munkedal II 585 and a descendant of Oppenheim LXII; he won the king's prize at the Jubilee celebrations in Odense in 1900, and 70,000 crowns were offered for him. From after the First World War, all Schleswig Coldbloods descended from this stallion.

By 1910, the Verband recorded 12,000 breeding animals. Through regional agricultural shows, the Schleswig Coldblood became widely known and was sold throughout Germany. The division of Schleswig between Denmark and Germany in 1920, in the aftermath of the First World War, meant the loss of a large part of the breeding area and was a major setback. However numbers rose again, and in 1949, reached a peak of about 450 stallions and 20,000 or 25,000 brood-mares in the hands of more than 15,000 breeders spread throughout Schleswig-Holstein, though more concentrated in the north. In 1958, two French stallions were added to the breeding stock.

In the years following the Second World War, the mechanisation of agriculture, with the replacement of agricultural horses with tractors, led to a dramatic decline in numbers. By 1976, there were no more than sixty mares registered. The breed association closed and the remaining animals were registered in the Schleswig-Holstein horse register in Kiel. A society for the protection of the breed was soon formed, and in 1991, this became the Verein Schleswiger Pferdezüchter, or Schleswig horse breeders' association.

Since 1997, numbers have remained stable at about 200–250; in 2013, there were 189 mares and 26 stallions. The Schleswig Coldblood was listed as "endangered" by the Food and Agriculture Organization of the United Nations in 2007. In 2013, it was in Category II: "seriously endangered" on the Rote Liste of the Gesellschaft zur Erhaltung alter und gefährdeter Haustierrassen, the German national association for the conservation of historic and endangered domestic animal breeds, and was listed as "minimally endangered" by the European Association for Animal Production.

Since 2012, a sub-population, the Hannoversches Kaltblut Schleswiger Ursprungs, or roughly "Hanoverian coldblood of Schleswig origin", has been included in the Schleswiger Coldblood breed; in 2012, there were a total of 62 – 4 stallions and 58 mares.

== Characteristics ==
The Schleswig Coldblood stands between 154–162 cm (15.1–16.0 hands). Stallions are, on average, about 2 cm taller than mares. It has a short and straight head with kind eyes and a broad forehead; a short, cresty neck; powerful shoulders; a long body with good depth in the girth; powerful hindquarters; short and stocky limbs with some feather. It is usually flaxen chestnut in colour, though grey and dark colours can occur.

== Uses ==
The Schleswig Coldblood was bred for use as a working horse. It was used on farms and for hauling timber from forests, to pull omnibuses and brewery wagons in cities, and for heavy work in the military. It is still used in agriculture and forestry, and for pulling wagons.
