= Alpines Steinschaf =

Alpine breed of sheep

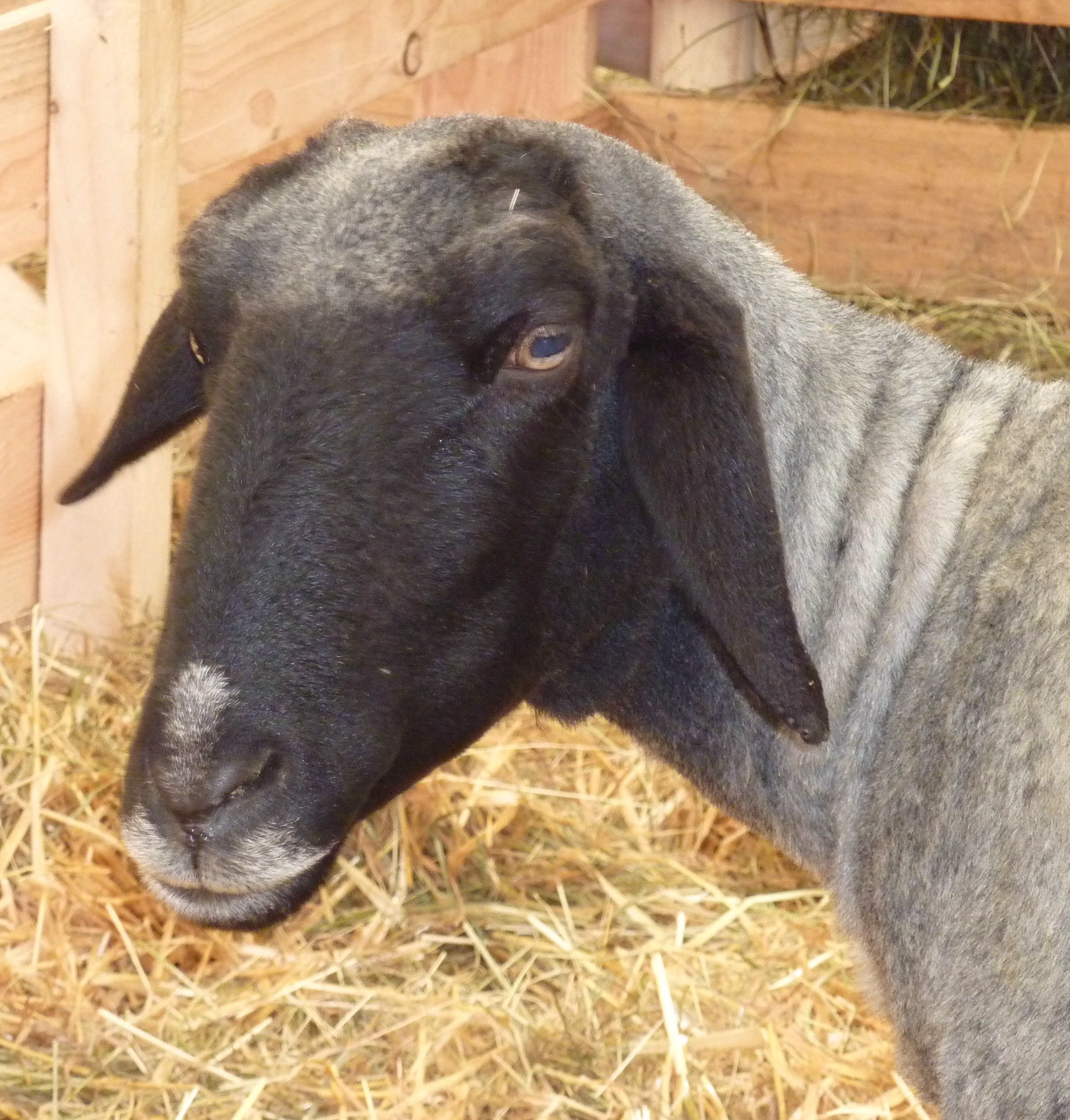

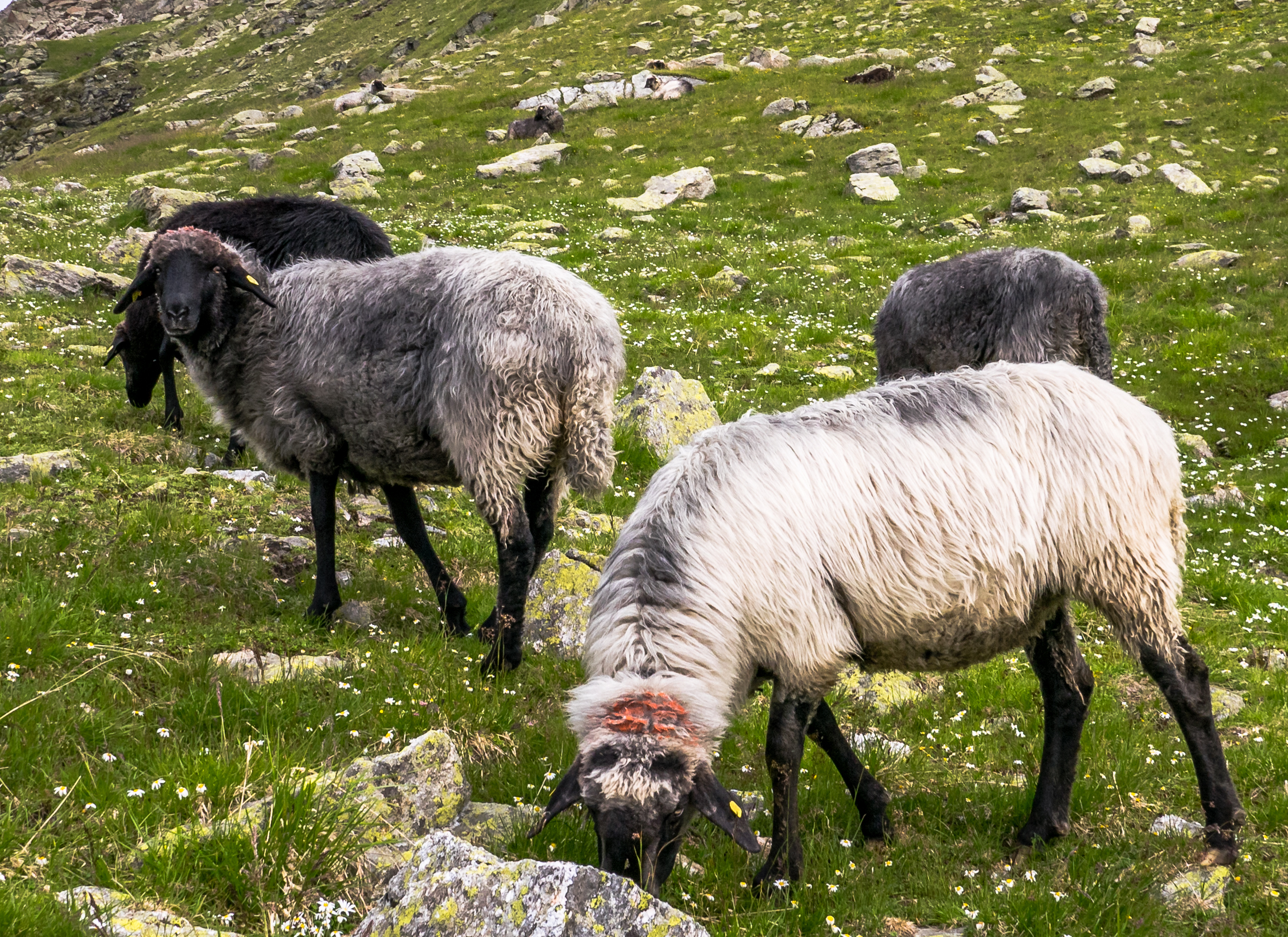
- Conservation status: Austria: FAO (2007): not listed; DAD-IS (2025): endangered-maintained; Germany: FAO (2007): critical-maintained; DAD-IS (2025): at risk/endangered
- Country of origin: Austria; Germany

Traits
- Weight: Male: 55–80 kg; Female: 40–60 kg

The Alpines Steinschaf is a breed of domestic sheep indigenous to the Eastern Alps of Austria and southern Germany. It is used for wool, meat and vegetation management.

== History ==
The Alpines Steinschaf is one of four breeds in the Steinschaf group, the others being the Krainer Steinschaf, the Montafoner Steinschaf and the Tiroler Steinschaf. They are variously thought to have derived from the mediaeval Zaupelschaf type, or from the older Torfschaf, and are believed to be the oldest sheep breeds of the eastern Alps. The origin and meaning of the word steinschaf is unknown, though various theories have been advanced.

At the start of the twentieth century the Alpines Steinschaf was widely distributed in the eastern Alps. In Austria it was found mainly in Salzburg, but also in Carinthia, North and East Tirol and in Vorarlberg. In Germany it was common in the Bavarian districts of Berchtesgaden and Traunstein and in the south-east part of Rosenheim. In Italy it was present in the Eisacktal, the Passeiertal, the upper Pustertal and in the upper Vinschgau, in the autonomous province of Bolzano; by 1964 the population in this area had fallen to below 1000 head.

The Alpines Steinschaf was the "endangered livestock breed of the year" of the German Gesellschaft zur Erhaltung alter und gefährdeter Haustierrassen – a national association for the conservation of historic and endangered breeds of domestic animals – in 2009, and was listed on its Rote Liste of endangered animal breeds as "extremely endangered" in 2014.

A total population of 491–650 was reported by Austria in 2012; Germany reported 791 head in 2013.

== Characteristics ==
The Alpines Steinschaf is a fine-boned mountain breed of small to medium size. Rams weigh 55 to 80 kg (120 to 180 lb), and ewes 40 to 60 kg (90 to 130 lb). All coat colours are found. The face and lower legs are without wool; the legs are thin but strong, and the hooves hard. Rams are often horned, ewes less often so. The ears are carried horizontally or slightly drooping. The face and ears may be marked with black.
