= American Pekin =

American breed of domestic duck

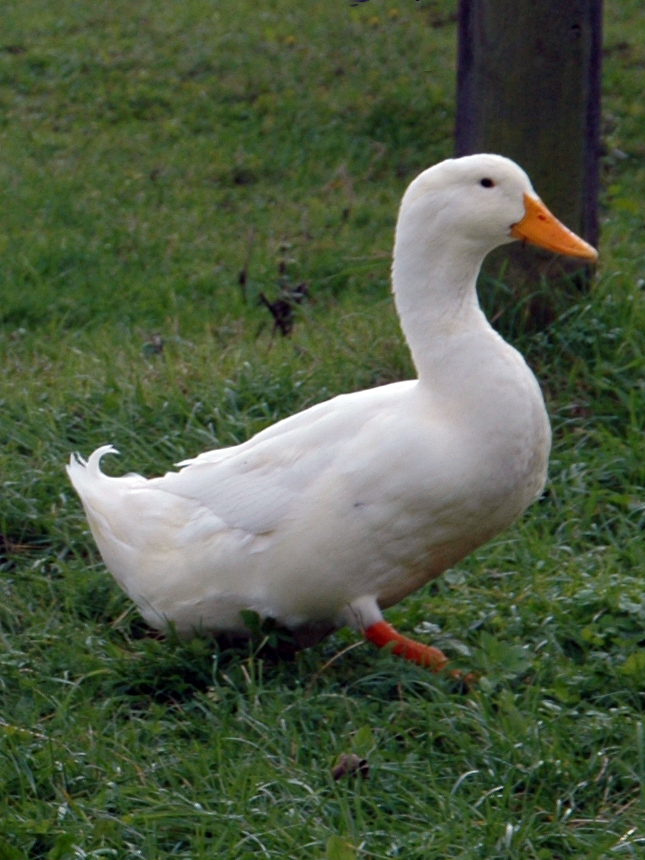
- Conservation status: FAO (2007): not at risk
- Other names: Pekin; White Pekin; Long Island Duck
- Country of origin: China; United States
- Distribution: world-wide
- Use: meat; eggs; fancy

Traits
- Weight: Male: 4.5 kg (10 lb); Female: 4.1 kg (9 lb)
- Egg colour: white or tinted

Classification
- APA: heavy
- EE: yes
- PCGB: no

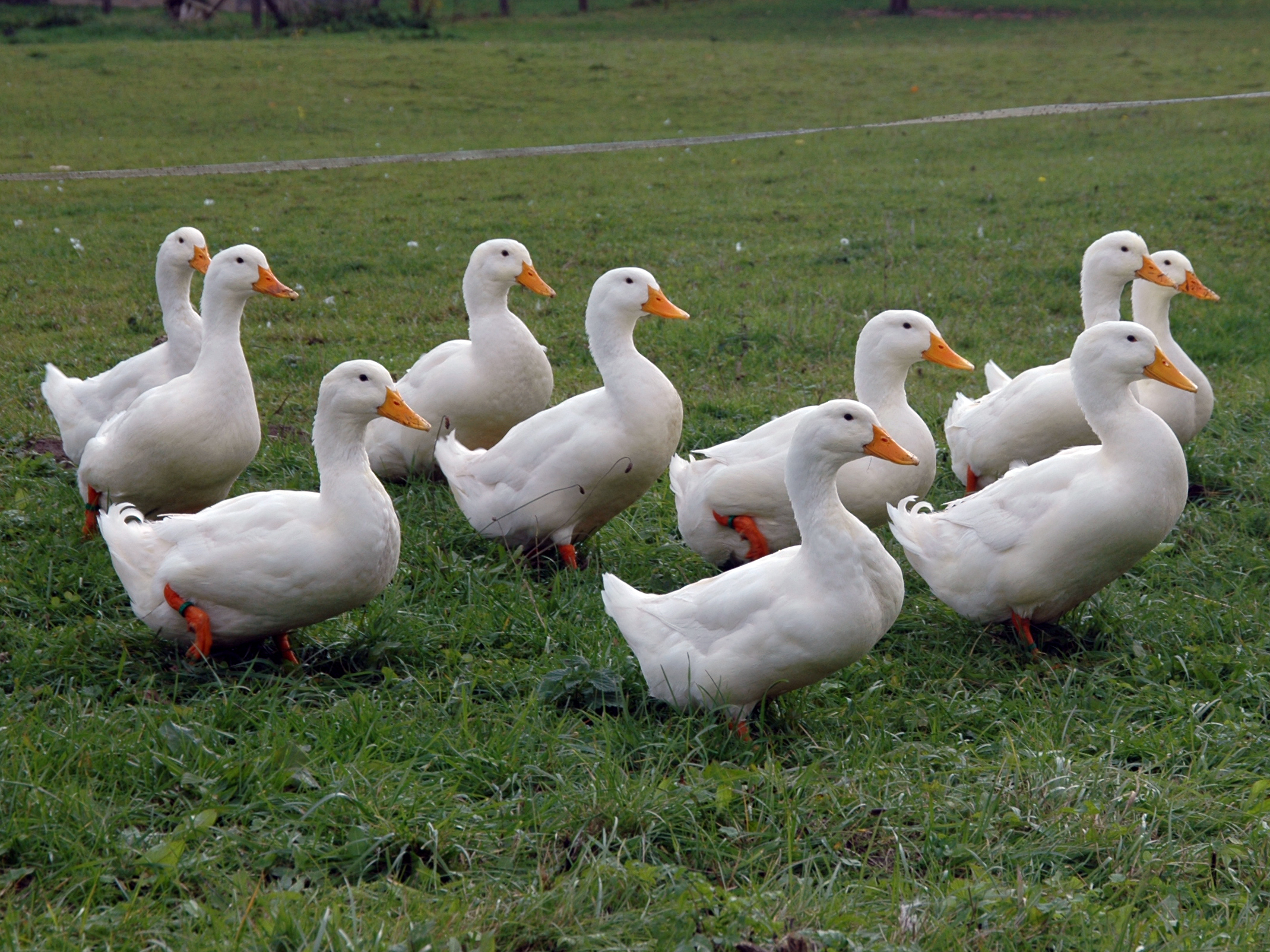
A flock

The Pekin or White Pekin is an American breed of domestic duck, raised primarily for meat. It derives from birds brought to the United States from China in the nineteenth century, and is now bred in many parts of the world. It is often known as the American Pekin to distinguish it from the German Pekin, a distinct and separate breed which derives from the same Chinese stock but has different breeding. Many of these ducks were reared on Long Island, New York, in the late nineteenth and early twentieth centuries, from which the breed derived its name Long Island Duck.

== History ==
The mallard was domesticated in China some 3000 years ago, and possibly much earlier. (Note: Domestic ducks are documented in central China from about 500 BC.) Force-feeding of ducks is documented from the tenth century, under the Five Dynasties. The Chinese were sophisticated breeders of ducks; among several breeds they created was one named shi-chin-ya-tze (十斤鴨子), which roughly translates to "ten-pound duck", from which the American Pekin derives.

In 1872, James E. Palmer of Stonington, Connecticut, loaded fifteen white ducks of this type for shipment to a businessman named McGrath in the United States. The birds were loaded at Shanghai but had been hatched in Peking (now called Beijing). Nine of them – six ducks and three drakes – survived the voyage, which took 124 days and reached New York City on 13 March 1873. Five of the surviving birds were dispatched to McGrath but were eaten before they reached him. Palmer's four birds became the foundation stock of the American Pekin; by July 1873, his three ducks had laid more than three hundred eggs.

The Pekin was included in the first edition of the Standard of Perfection, published in 1874 by the new American Poultry Association. It was soon in widespread production for slaughter. Until that time the duck most commonly raised for meat had been the Cayuga, which had the disadvantage of dark feathering, so that any fluff remaining on the carcass was easily seen; the white-feathered Pekin was preferable.

Other birds of the same type were imported to the United Kingdom in 1872 and from there soon reached Germany, where they gave rise to the German Pekin, a distinct and separate breed. In Germany, the Chinese ducks were cross-bred with upright white ducks brought from Japan by Dutch ships, resulting in birds with a steep body angle; those taken to the United States were crossed with birds of the British Aylesbury breed, which led to birds with a more horizontal stance. The Pekin in the United Kingdom derives from birds imported from Germany from about 1970.

== Characteristics ==
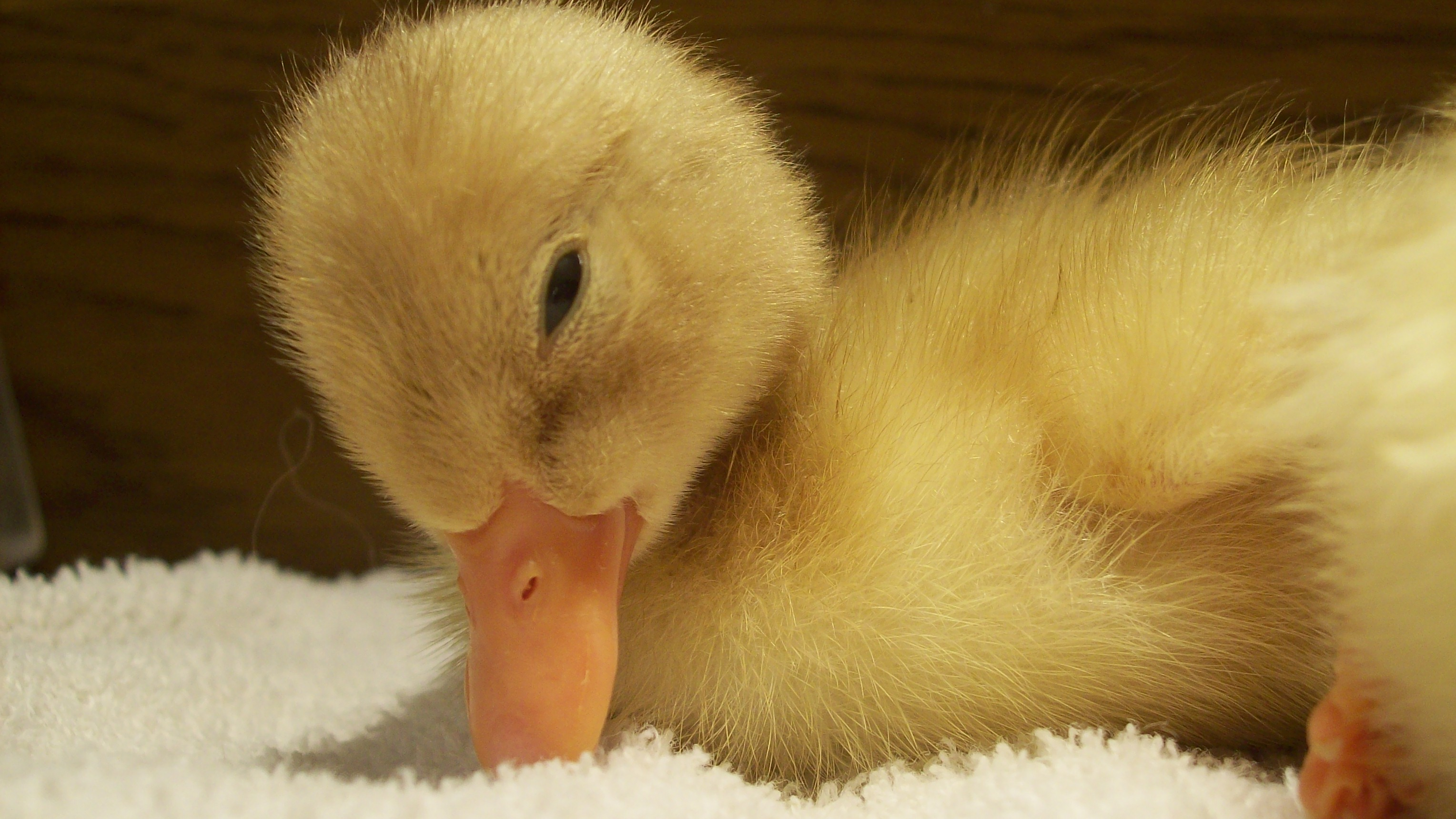
Duckling

The American Pekin is large and solidly built. The body is rectangular as seen from the side and is held at about 40º to the horizontal; the tail projects above the line of the back. The breast is smooth and broad and does not show a pronounced keel. The head is large and rounded, and the neck is thick. The plumage is creamy white, the legs and feet are a yellowish orange. The beak is yellow, fairly short, and almost straight.

== Use ==
The American Pekin is raised almost exclusively for meat. In the United States, more than half of all ducks raised for slaughter are of this breed. Numbers in the United States alone are in the tens of millions. The birds are large-framed, hardy and fast-growing – they may reach a body-weight of more than 3.5 kg (8 lb) in seven weeks. They have a high feed conversion ratio, are calm-tempered and fertile, and their eggs have a high rate of hatchability. The white feathers make the carcass easy to clean after being plucked.

A number of commercial strains have been developed, including types kept solely as layers. From the time the birds reached the United States, selective breeding of meat birds was mainly directed towards size, strength and rate of growth. More recently, attempts have been made to reduce the proportion of fat in the carcass, even if growth rate and feed conversion ratio are also reduced.

Pekin ducks may lay over 150 white eggs per year. They are not good sitters, and eggs may need to be artificially incubated.

The American Pekin is sometimes kept for fancy and showing. Show birds are often larger than commercial production stock.

== See also ==
- Call duck
