= Dülmener =

Breed of horse

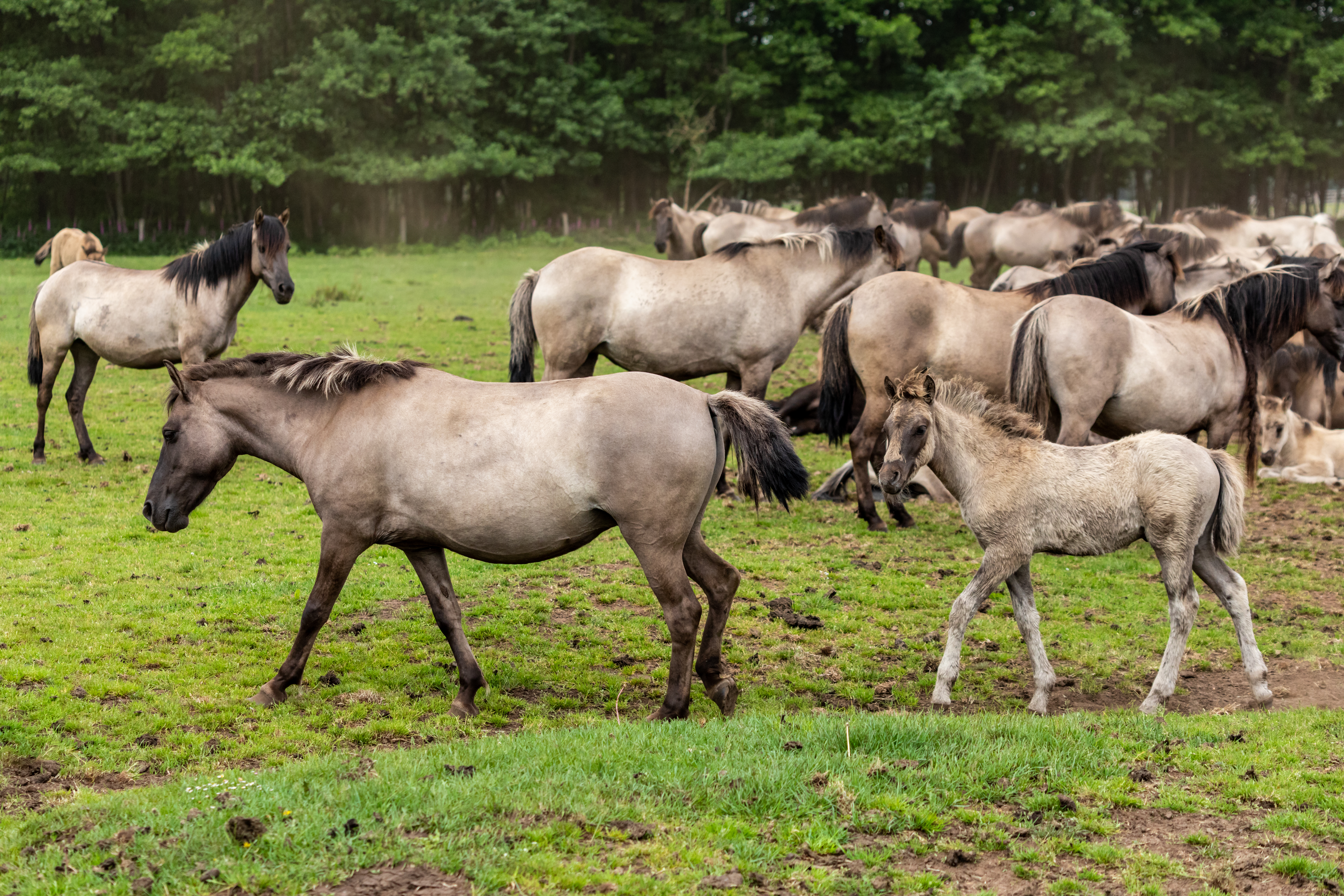
- Conservation status: FAO (2007): critical; DAD-IS (2021): at risk; GEH (2021): extremely endangered
- Other names: Merfelderbrücher; Dülmen Horse; Dülmen Pony
- Country of origin: Germany
- Distribution: Nordrhein-Westfalen, Germany

Traits
- Height: 122–132 cm
- Colour: usually striped dun

The Dülmener or Dülmen is a German breed of small feral horse. It was formerly known as the Merfelderbrücher. A herd of approximately 300 head lives in feral conditions in an area of about 3.5 km^{2} in the Merfelder Bruch, near the town of Dülmen in the Kreis of Coesfeld in north-western Nordrhein-Westfalen, in north-western Germany.

It is gravely endangered; in 2014 it was the "endangered breed of the year" of the Gesellschaft zur Erhaltung alter und gefährdeter Haustierrassen, and in 2021 was classified in category I, extrem gefährdet (extremely endangered) on the Rote Liste of that association.

== History ==
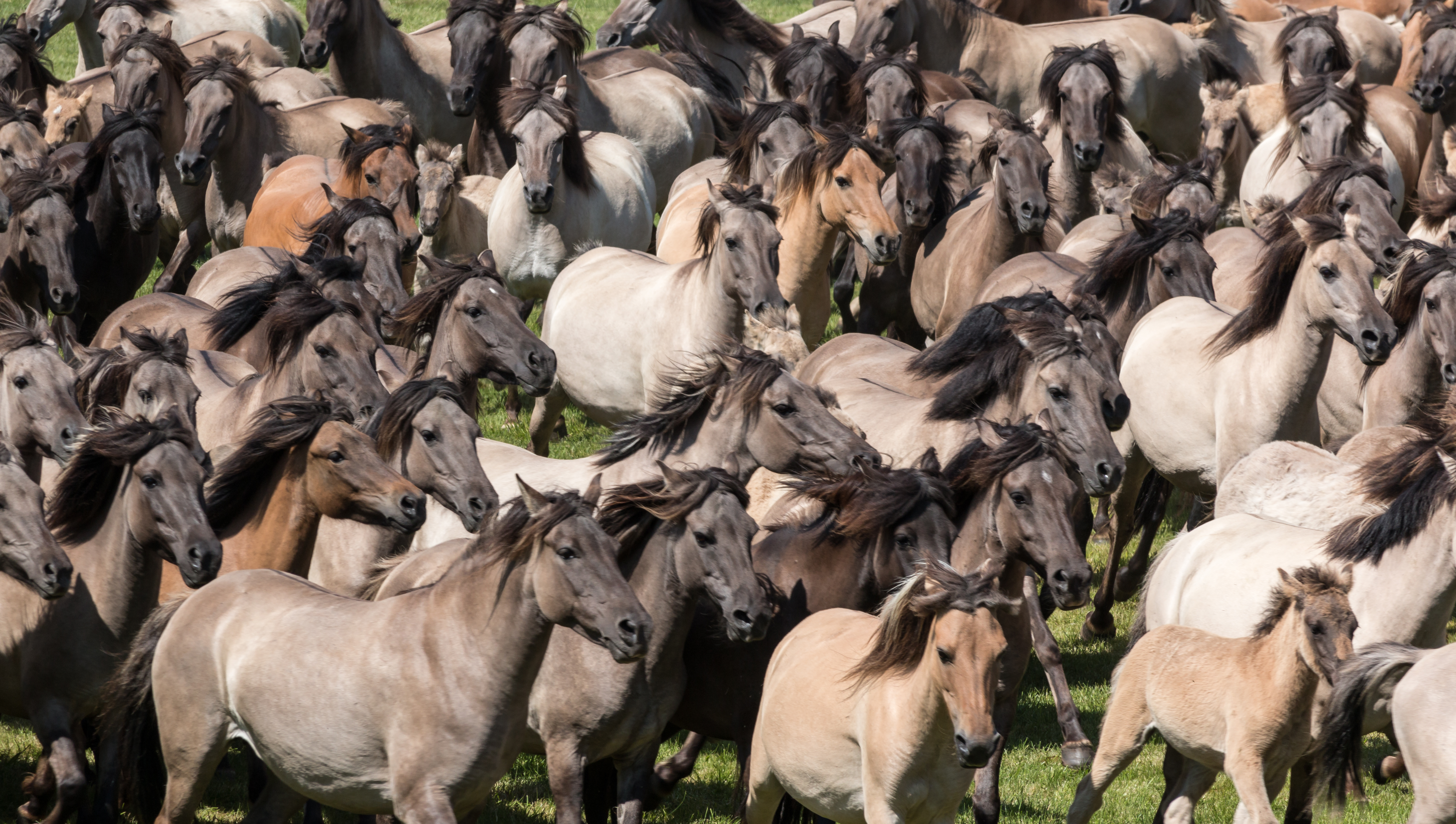

== Use ==
Most Dülmener mares live in unmanaged feral conditions in the Merfelder Bruch. Once a year, at the end of May, the horses are rounded up and some colt foals are separated from the herd to be sold at auction. Once trained, these may make good riding or driving horses.

== See also ==
- List of German horse breeds
