= Thuringian goat =

Breed of goat

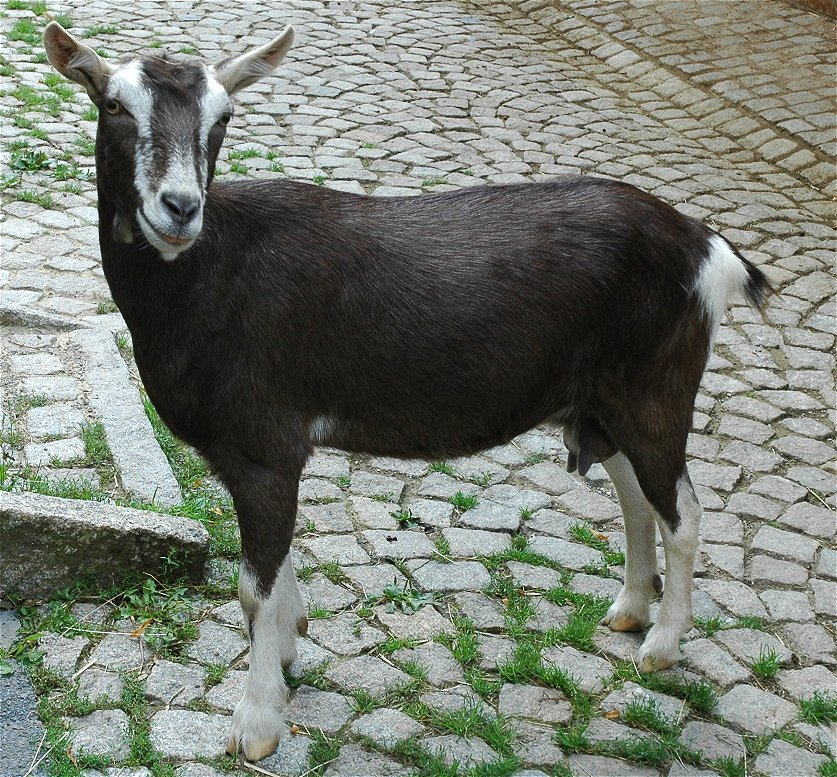
Thuringian Goat

The Thuringian goat breed from Thüringen in central Germany is utilized for the production of milk. It is a variety of the German Improved Fawn goat breed. The Thuringian goat breed is derived from the selective-breeding of crosses between Toggenburg, Harzerziege, Rhönziege, and Thüringer Landziege goat breeds. It is well-adapted to mountainous regions but is almost extinct.

== See also ==
- List of goat breeds
- Erzgebirge goat
