= Bentheimer Landschaf =

Breed of sheep

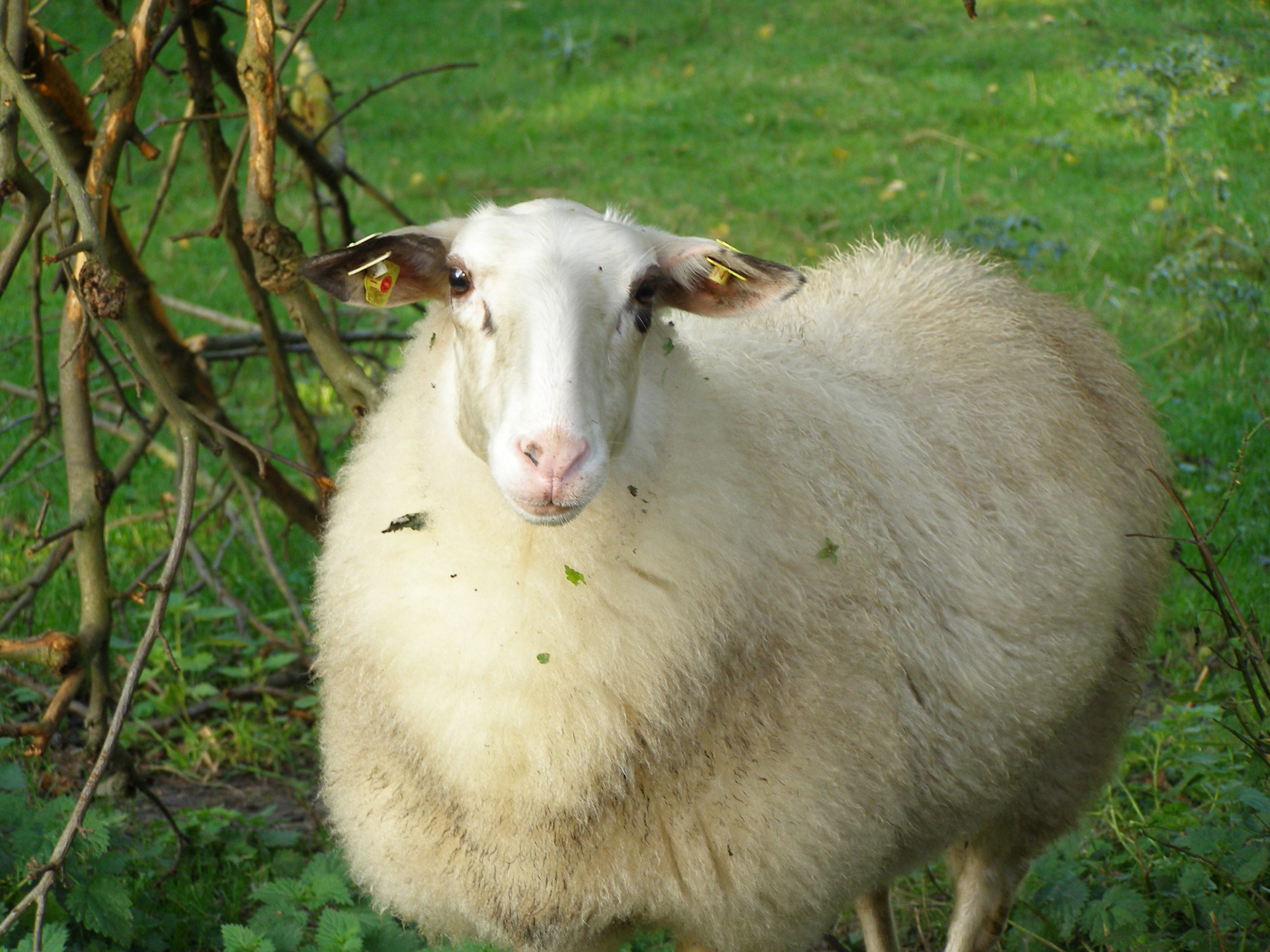
Bentheimer Landschaf

The Bentheimer Landschaf (also known as Landrace of Bentheim) is a breed of domesticated sheep found in Germany. This breed is a cross between German and Dutch heath sheep and a marsh sheep. It is primarily used for landscape preservation.

== Characteristics ==
The Bentheimer Landschaf displays white and has black around the eyes, ears and legs. The fleece weighs 3 to 4 kg (6.6 to 8.8 lb) with a fiber diameter of 34 to 40 micrometres.

Ewes weigh on average 60 kg (130 lb) and grow to 67 cm (26 in) at the withers at maturity.
