= Bentheim Black Pied pig =

Breed of pig

Bentheim Black Pied
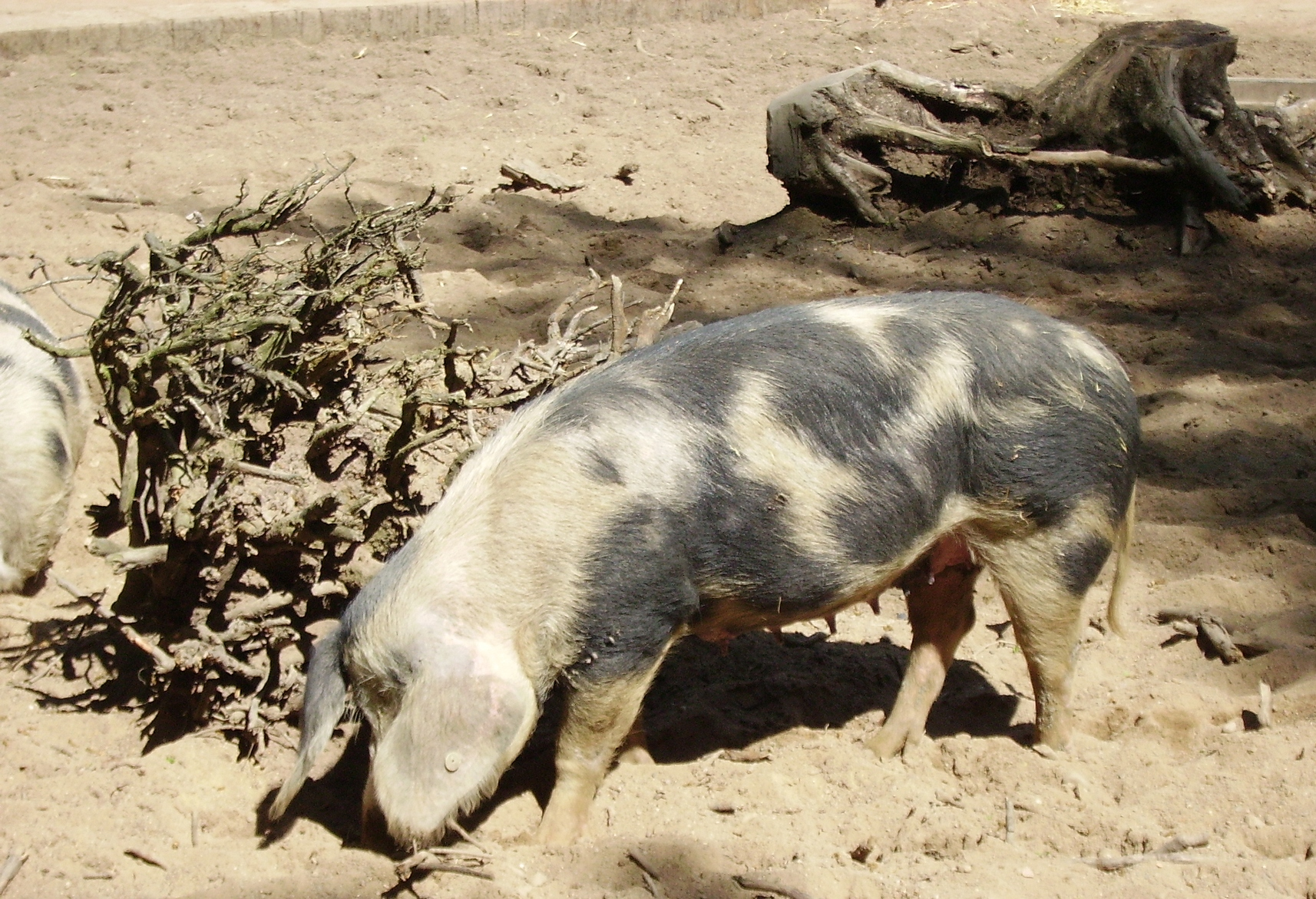
- Bentheim Black Pied
- Conservation status: Rare breed
- Country of origin: Germany

Traits
- Weight: Male: 250 kilograms (550 lb); Female: 180 kilograms (400 lb)

The Bentheim Black Pied, also known as Schwarz-Wesses or Buntes Bentheimer Schwein, is a rare breed of domestic pig in Germany.

The breed originated in Bentheim, Germany, in the early 20th century, when local breeds were crossed with Berkshire and Cornwalls. It became nearly extinct in the 1950s, and is now a "rare breed". with about 100 registered breeding animals.

== Description ==
Pigs are medium-sized, lop-eared, and colored white with black spots. Boars average 75 cm height, 250 kg weight; sows average 70 cm height, 180 kg weight.
