= Murnau-Werdenfels =

Breed of cattle

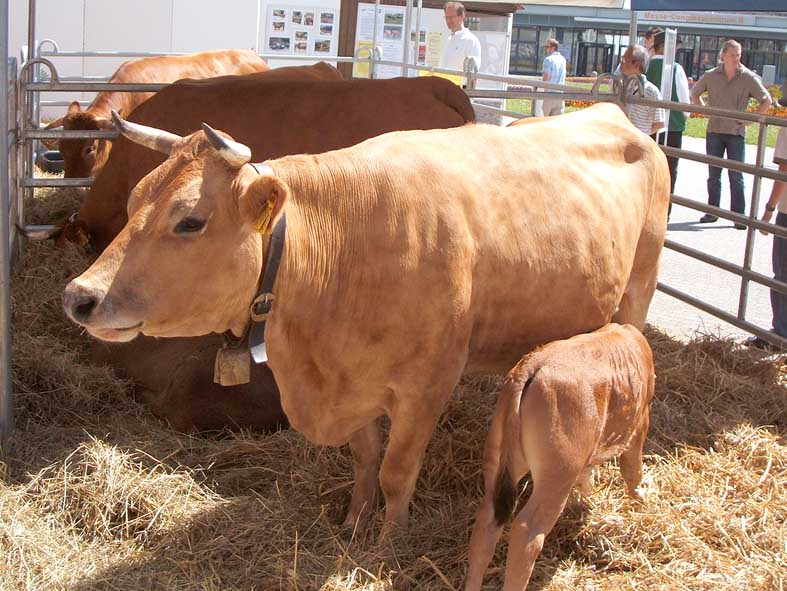
Murnau-Werdenfels Cattle in Germany

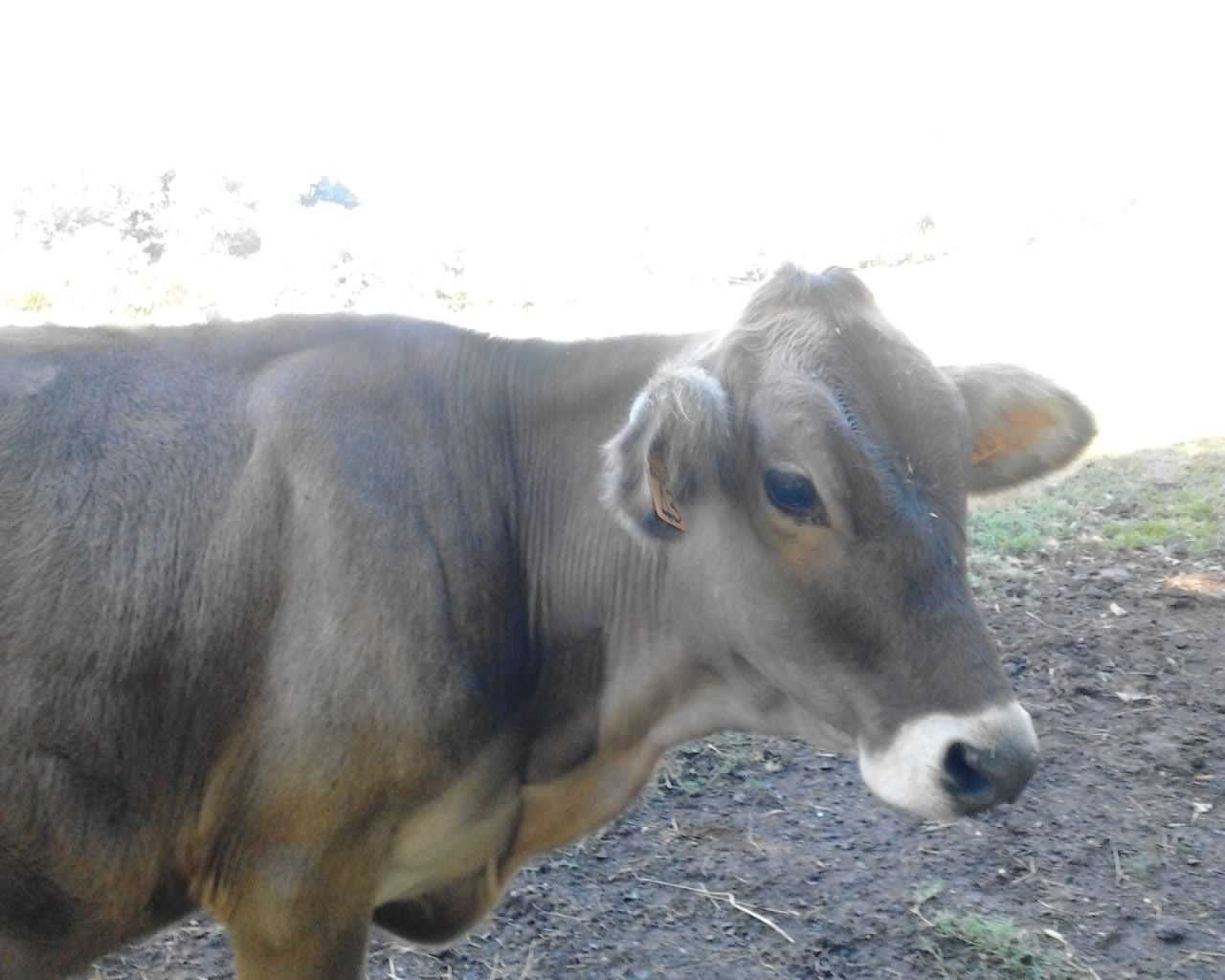
Murnau-Werdenfels Cattle in Italy

Murnau-Werdenfels Cattle are an old, robust dairy breed from Upper Bavaria, the southernmost part of Germany.

The animals are brown-yellow, but there are great colour variations from straw-yellow to reddish brown. Hooves and horn tips are black. There is a white rim around a dark muzzle. They are very long-lived and fertile. It is a German breed that is specially adapted to a husbandry in boggy landscapes. The breed originated in Tyrol, Austria and is closely related to Brown Swiss, Braunvieh and Tyrolese Grey Cattle. Nowadays the main breeding region is around Garmisch-Partenkirchen and Murnau that is also called "Werdenfels Country". The breed is in danger of extinction, with only around 130 females in the herdbook and frozen semen from around eleven males. the breed was voted Endangered Breed of the Year 2007 by the German Society for the Conservation of Old and Endangered Livestock Breeds. The Federal State of Bavaria maintains a suckler herd of cows and a sperm bank. It gives financial support to breeders. The breed is part of the Ark of Taste of the Slow Food Foundation for Biodiversity, dedicated to the preserving of endangered agricultural heritage.

Cows produce around 4300 kg of milk per year (3.8% fat; 3.4% protein). They reach 128–130 cm in height and a weight of 500–600 kg, while the bulls may reach 138–145 cm and 850–950 kg. Both bulls and bullocks may be used for beef production. Bullocks formerly served as strong draught oxen and were an important source of income for small farms.
