= Angeln Saddleback =

Breed of pig

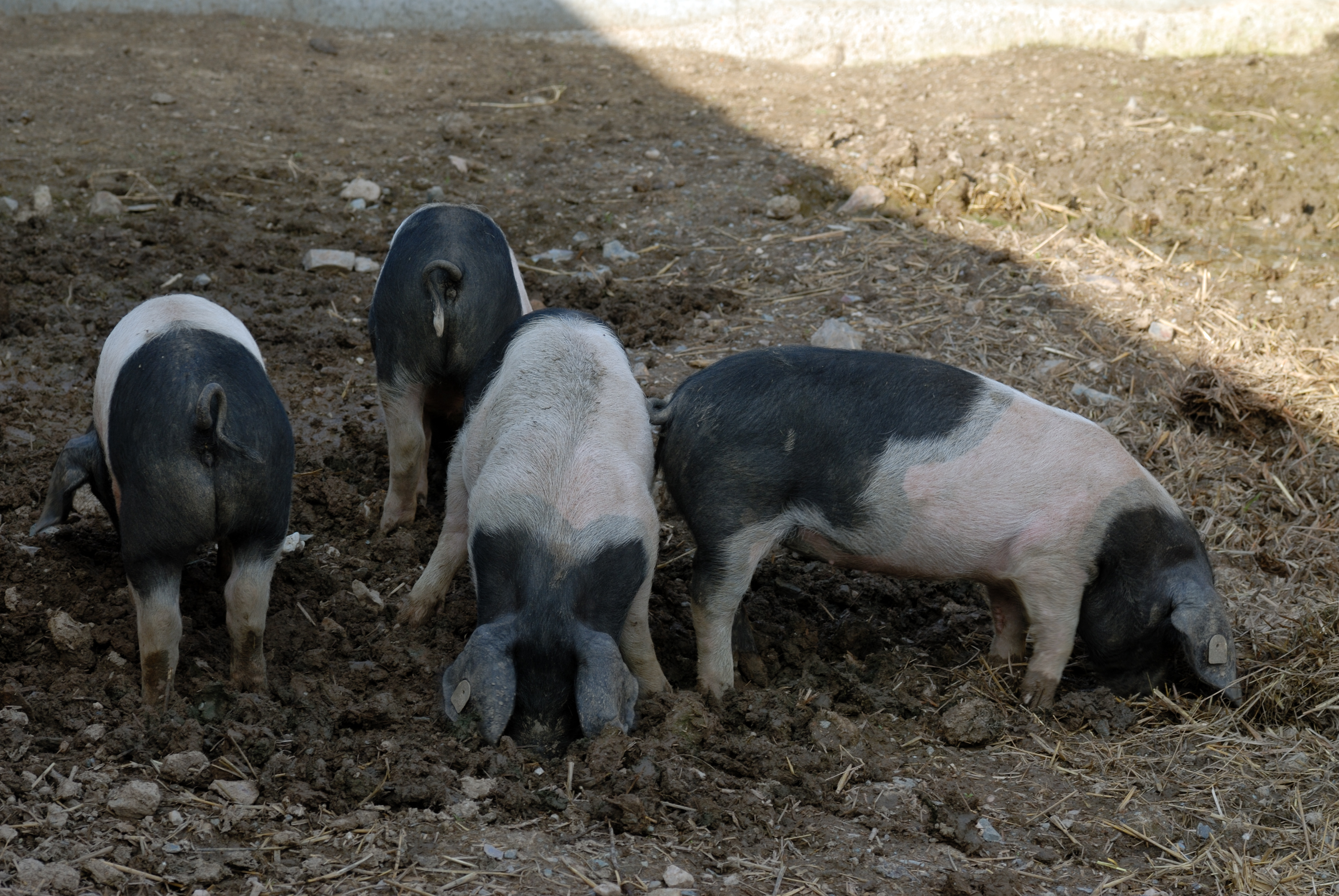
- Angeln Saddlebacks
- Conservation status: Rare breed
- Other names: Angler Sattelschwein, Angler sadelsvin, "Angeln Saddleswine"
- Country of origin: Germany

Traits
- Weight: Male: 350 kilograms (770 lb); Female: 300 kilograms (660 lb)

Notes
- Crossed German black-and-white Landrace with Wessex Saddleback

The Angeln Saddleback, also known as the Angler Sattelschwein (German) or Angler sadelsvin (Danish), is a rare breed of domestic pig grown mainly in Schleswig-Holstein, Germany. It is a large, lop-eared, black pig with a white belt around its body at the forefeet.

The breed originated in Angeln, Germany (until 1864 Denmark), by crossing a local German black-and-white Landrace with Wessex Saddleback. It became established in Schleswig-Holstein as a separate and distinct breed in 1937, and by the 1950s commanded a substantial local market share. In recent years, however, it has become nearly extinct as market sentiment has turned against its fatty meat. It is well adapted to outdoor systems of management and is likely to see an upturn in popularity as breeders turn away from more intensive systems of production.

Typical sizes are 350 kg weight, 92 cm (36 in) height (boars), and 300 kg weight, 84 cm (33 in) height (sows). The sows are highly fertile with much milk.
