= List of Japanese chicken breeds =

This is a list of the chicken breeds considered in Japan to be wholly or partly of Japanese origin. Some may have complex or obscure histories, so inclusion here does not necessarily imply that a breed is predominantly or exclusively Japanese.

Local name	Other names	Notes	Image
Aizu-Jidori^{[1]}^{[2]}			
Chabo^{[1]}	Japanese Bantam^{[2]}	short-shank bantam with erect tail^{[1]}	
Daigiri-Shamo^{[1]}		single-combed Shamo^{[1]}	
Echigo-Nankin-Shamo^{[1]}			
Ehime-Jidori^{[1]}			
Ekoku^{[2]}			
Gan-Dori^{[1]}	Gankei^{[2]}	creeper^{[1]}	
Gifu-Jidori^{[1]}^{[2]}			
Hinai-Dori^{[1]}^{[2]}			
Hiroshima-Tsuuji^{[1]}		gamefowl^{[1]}	
Ingie^{[1]}	Ingii-Dori^{[2]}	rumpless^{[1]}	
Ise-Jidori^{[2]}			
Iwate-Jidori^{[1]}^{[2]}			
Izumo^{[1]}		utility^{[1]}	
Jisuri^{[1]}		short-shank^{[1]}	
Jitokko^{[1]}^{[2]}		creeper^{[1]}	
Kawachi-Yakko^{[1]}^{[2]}			
Kinpa^{[1]}	Kinpachi-Dori^{[2]}	henny-feathered gamefowl	
Koeyoshi^{[1]}^{[2]}		long-crower^{[1]}	
Ko-Shamo^{[1]}^{[2]}		gamefowl^{[1]}	
Kumamoto^{[1]}	Kumamotoshu^{[2]}	utility^{[1]}	
Kureko-Dori^{[1]}^{[2]}		longtail^{[1]}	
Kuro-Kashiwa^{[1]}^{[2]}		black plumage^{[1]}	
Mie-Jidori^{[1]}			
Mikawa^{[1]}	Mikawashu^{[2]}	utility^{[1]}	
Minohiki^{[1]}	Minohiki-Dori^{[2]}	longtail, particularly long saddles^{[1]}	
Miyaji-Dori^{[1]}^{[2]}		creeper^{[1]}	
Nagoya^{[1]}	Nagoyashu^{[2]}	utility^{[1]}	
Nankin-Shamo^{[1]}^{[2]}			
Ohiki^{[1]}		longtail^{[1]} bantam	
Oh-Shamo^{[1]}^{[2]}		large gamefowl^{[1]}	
Okinawa-Hige-Jidori^{[1]}^{[2]}		bearded^{[1]}	
Sado-Hige-Jidori^{[1]}^{[2]}		bearded^{[1]}	
Satsumadori^{[1]}^{[2]}		gamefowl^{[1]}	
Shibattori^{[1]}	Shiba-Dori^{[2]}		
Shoukoku^{[1]}	Oguni-Dori^{[2]}		
Tokara-Jidori^{[1]}			
Tokuji-Jidori^{[1]}			
Tomaru^{[1]}^{[2]}		long-crower^{[1]}	
Tosa-Kojidori^{[1]}			
Tosa-Kukin^{[1]}	Tosa-Cochin^{[2]}	utility^{[1]}	
Tosa-Onagadori^{[1]}	Onagadori^{[2]}	longtail^{[1]}	
Tosa-Jidori^{[2]}			
Totenko^{[1]}	Totenko-Dori^{[2]}	black plumage long-crower^{[1]}	
Tsushima-Jidori^{[1]}^{[2]}			
Ukokkei^{[1]}^{[2]}		silkie-feathered^{[1]}	
Utaicharn^{[1]}	Utai-Chahn^{[2]}	crower^{[1]}	
Uzurao^{[1]}		rumpless bantam	
Yakido^{[1]}	Ygido, Hachikido^{[2]}	gamefowl^{[1]}	
Yamato-Shamo^{[1]}^{[2]}		gamefowl^{[1]}	
