= Yurlov =

Yurlov may refer to

- Yurlov (surname)
- Yurlov Crower, a Russian breed of chicken
- 7558 Yurlov, a minor planet
