= Krüper =

German breed of chicken

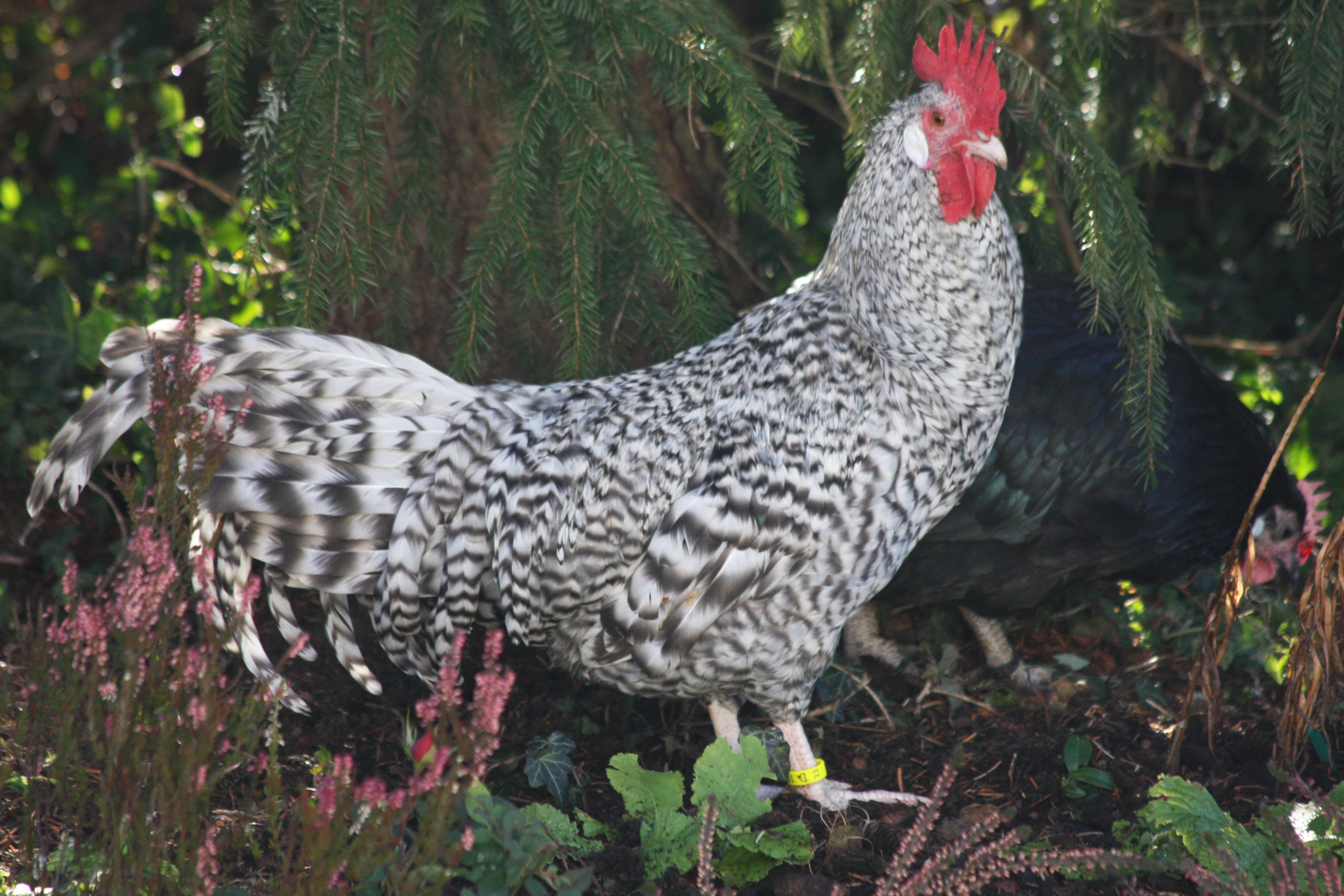
- Cock (cuckoo plumage)
- Conservation status: FAO (2007): endangered; DAD-IS (2023): at risk/endangered; GEH (2023): gravely endangered
- Country of origin: Germany
- Standard: Sonderverein der Krüper- und Zwerg-Krüperzüchter (in German)
- Use: ornament

Classification

The Krüper (German pronunciation: [ˈkʁyːpɐ]) is a German breed of creeper chicken. It originates in the former Duchy of Berg, now the Bergisches Land in western Germany, and is one of three chicken breeds from that area, the others being the Bergische Kräher and the Bergische Schlotterkamm. It belongs to the group of original European creeper breeds. The breed has normal-sized and bantam varieties.

== History ==
Creeper chickens have been known and described since Renaissance times at least. An early description is in the De avium natura of the Swiss naturalist Conrad Gessner of 1555. Chickens of this type were described and illustrated in the Monstrorum Historia of the Bolognese naturalist Ulisse Aldrovandi (1522–1605), published posthumously in 1642 with text by Bartolomeo Ambrosini. In his The Variation of Animals and Plants Under Domestication of 1868, Charles Darwin writes that creeper chickens were among the types described in a Chinese encyclopaedia compiled from earlier sources and published in 1596.

The Krüper was traditionally found in the former Duchy of Berg (now known as the Bergisches Land), and also in Westphalia and Saxony. After the near-extinction of the French "Courtes-Pattes", this breed could be reconstructed by crossing local French chickens with krupers. The bantam variety, which also had become extinct, has been rebred by crossbreeding with German bantams.

A breed society, the Sonderverein der Krüper- und Zwergkrüperzüchter was established in 1904.

In the twenty-first century the Krüper is an endangered breed. On the Rote Liste of the Gesellschaft zur Erhaltung alter und gefährdeter Haustierrassen it is in category 1, extrem gefährdet, 'gravely endangered'. With the Bayerische Landgans and the other two chicken breeds of the Bergisches Land – the Bergische Kräher and the Bergische Schlotterkamm – it was the 'endangered breed of the year' of the association in 2001. The Zwerg-Krüper, the bantam version of the breed, is also endangered.

A census in Germany in 2013 resulted in a number of 288 hens and 79 cocks, including all varieties. Sperm of some cocks has therefore been cryo-conserved by the Bruno-Dürigen Institute as a genetic reserve.

== Characteristics ==
The most typical feature of the Krüper is the reduced length of the legs, measuring 7-10 cm. The cock weights max. 2.25 kg, the hen 1.5-2.0 kg. The comb is single, the earlobes white and round. The body is long and cylindrical. The legs are slate grey. The eggs are white-coloured. The kruper is known in black, white, cuckoo, silver, gold and partridge. The bantams can be found in white and silver duckwing plumage. The silver and gold animals have a typical broad feather lacing called "Dobbelung", which only occurs in the three Berg chicken breeds.

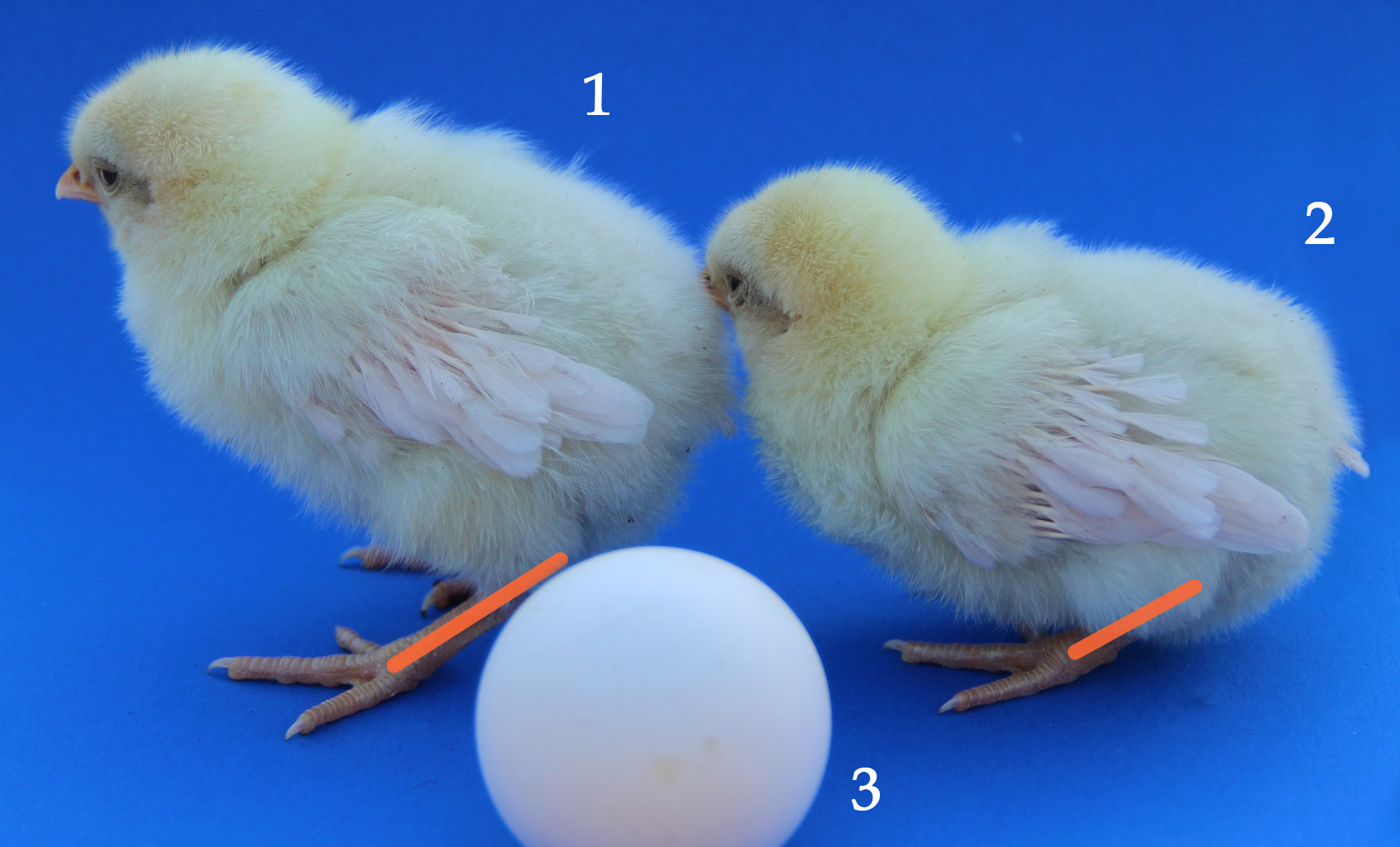
1: long-legged chick, 2: short-legged chick, 3: not-hatched egg (tarsus length marked in orange)
