= Bird singing contest =

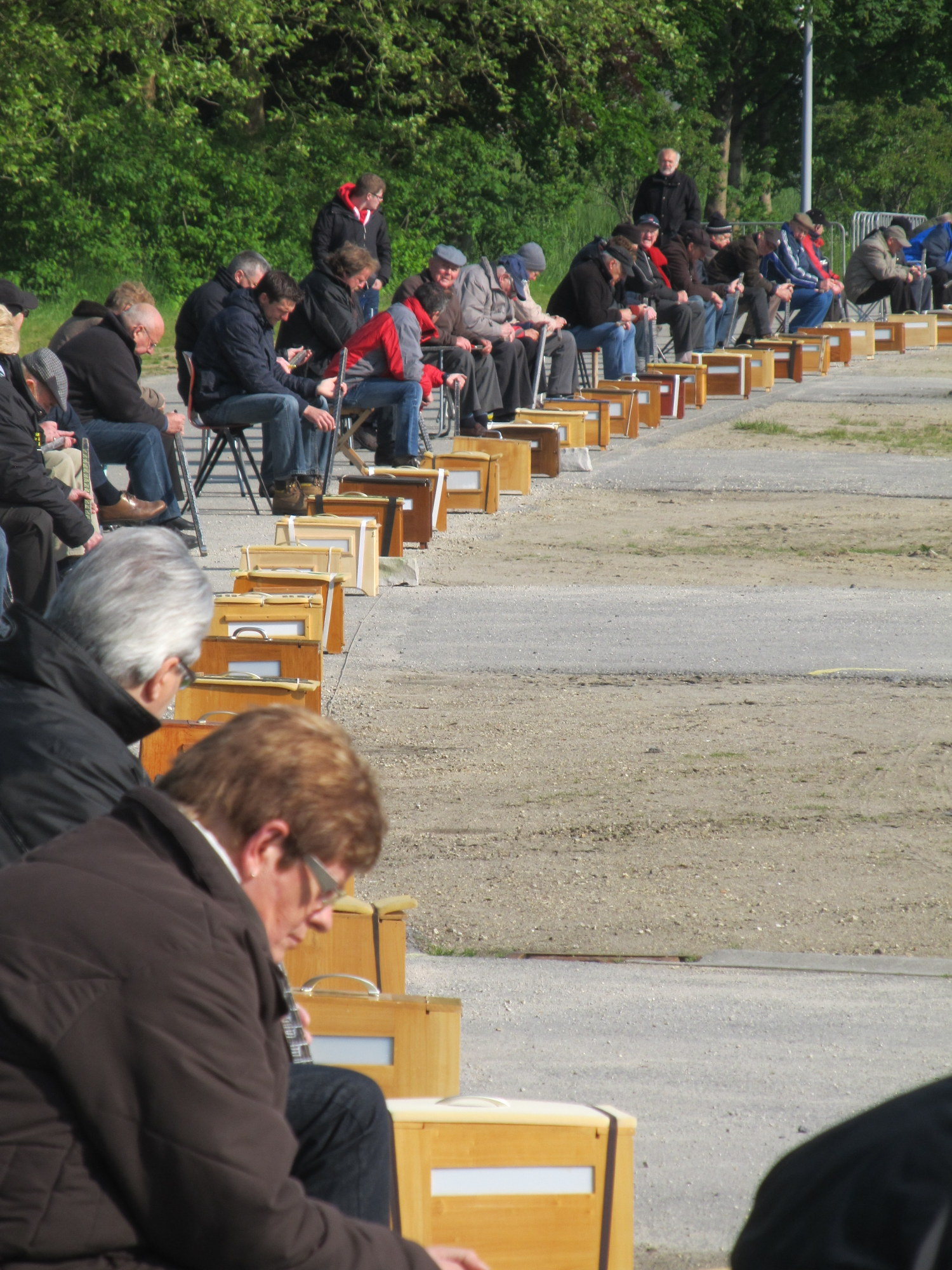
Getting ready for the Vinkensport contest (2013)

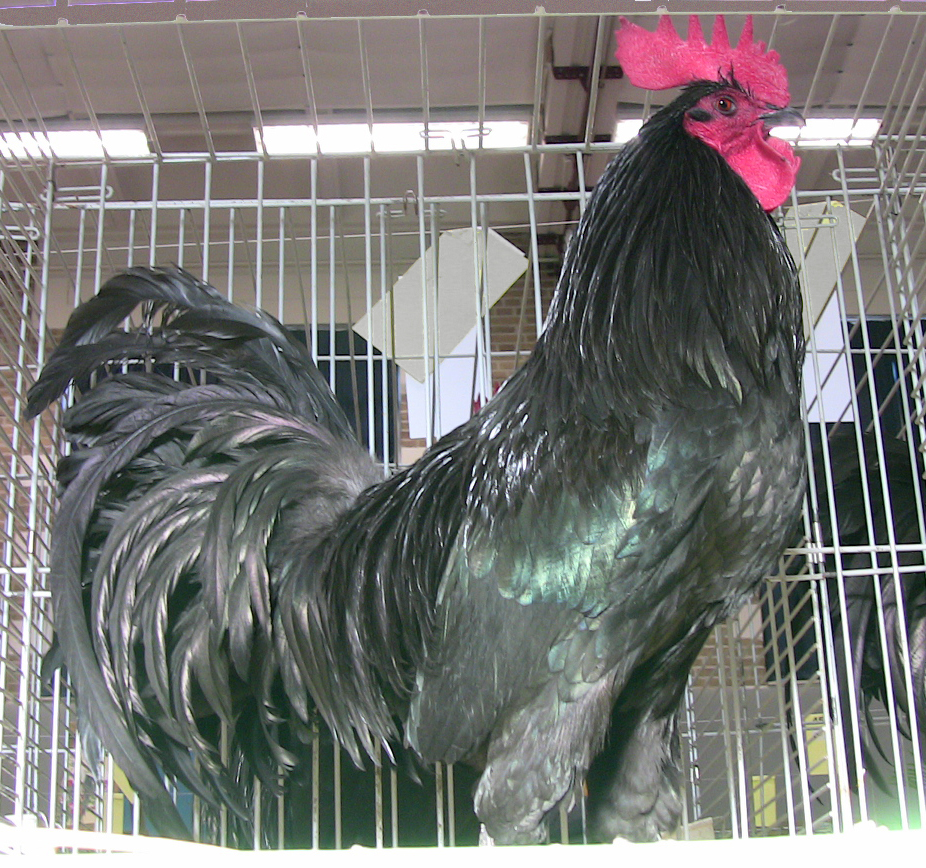
One of the Japanese long-crowing cocks, Tomaru

A bird singing contest is a competition of songbirds, usually caged examples of wild species. Such contests are held in at least 22 countries of the world, and at least 36 different species are used in this way. The practice is particularly widespread in Southeast Asia, where it increases trade in songbirds and may contribute to the decline of threatened species.

== Americas ==
The bird singing contest is a popular sport in Guyana, while in Brazil singing contests featuring the chestnut-bellied seed finch (curió in Portuguese) are held.

== Asia ==
In Southern China, it is a common sight to witness the elderly people bringing the cages of Chinese hwamei to the local parks to enjoy their singing. In Japan, there are nationwide societies to exchange information on improving singing of the warbling white-eye and other birds.

In Indonesia, hundreds of songbird competitions are held all over the country every year. In Thailand, bird singing contests are also held frequently. The practice of wild species caged in is particularly widespread in Southeast Asia, where it increases trade in songbirds and may contribute to the decline of threatened species.

Surveys conducted by a team led by EcoVerde Global Consulting found that the crested jayshrike is used as a “master bird” to train songbird species that compete in songbird competitions. While it received legal protection in Indonesia in 2018, the trade in the bird markets remained as open as when it was not protected, and the number of individuals for the species remained unchanged over a 15 year period

== Europe ==
In Belgium, vinkensport is a contest of how many bird calls are made per hour by chaffinches.

== See also ==
- Cock crowing contests
- Bird vocalization
