= Hiki =

Hiki may refer to:

== People with the given name ==
- Hiki Yoshikazu (比企 能員, ?-1203), Japanese samurai lord
- Yoshiki Hiki (比企 能樹, 1933–2022), Japanese rower
- Mari Hiki (比企 マリ, born 1968), Japanese singer, songwriter and photographer

== Places ==
- Hiki District, Saitama, a district in Saitama Prefecture, Japan
- Kii-Hiki Station, a railway station in Shirahama, Nishimuro District, Wakayama Prefecture, Japan

== Other uses ==
- Hurricane Hiki, the wettest tropical cyclone on record in the United States

== See also ==
- Haikai
- Heiki
- Heikki
- Hikki (disambiguation)
- Ohiki
