= Índio Gigante =

Brazilian breed of chicken

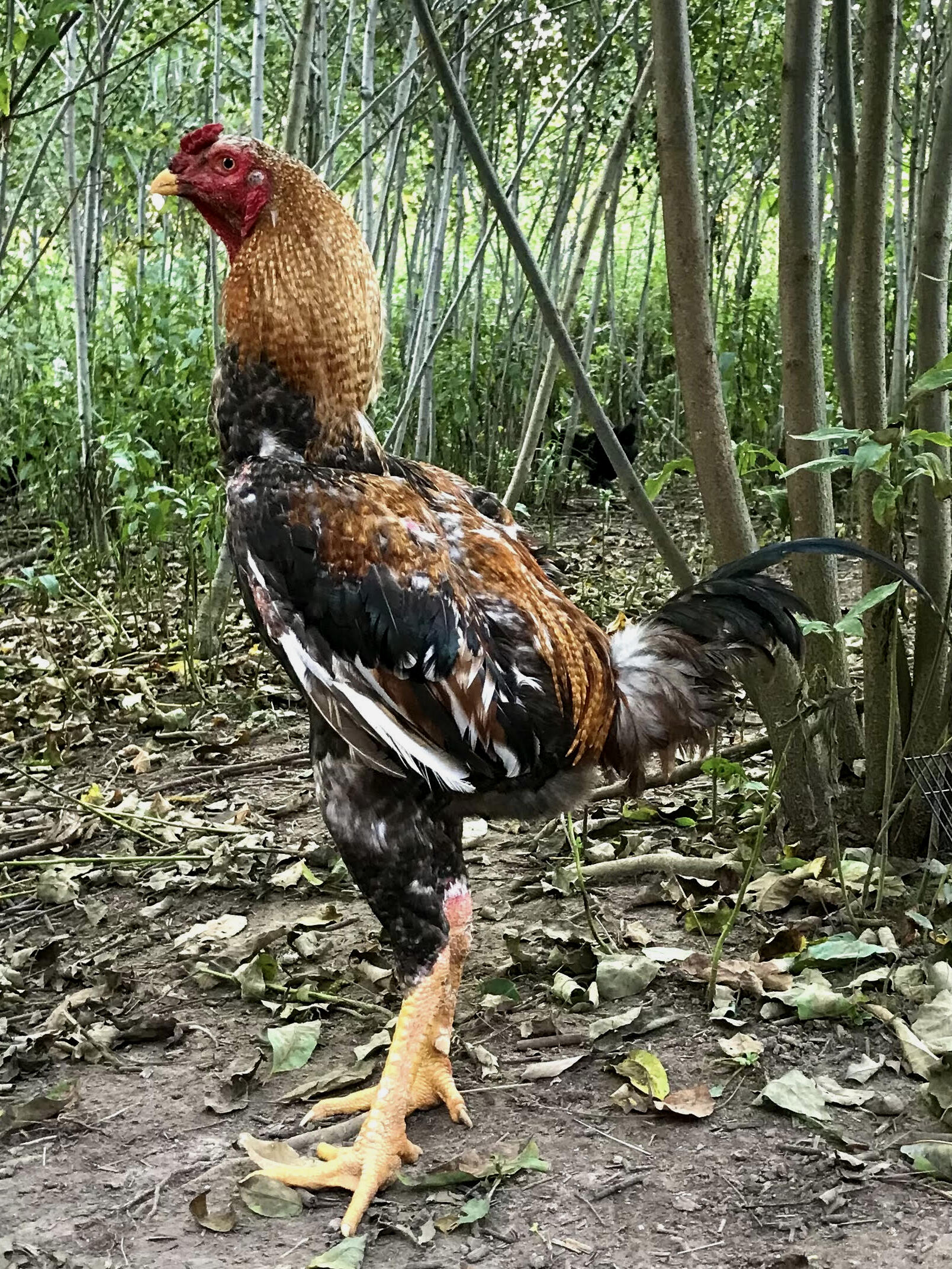

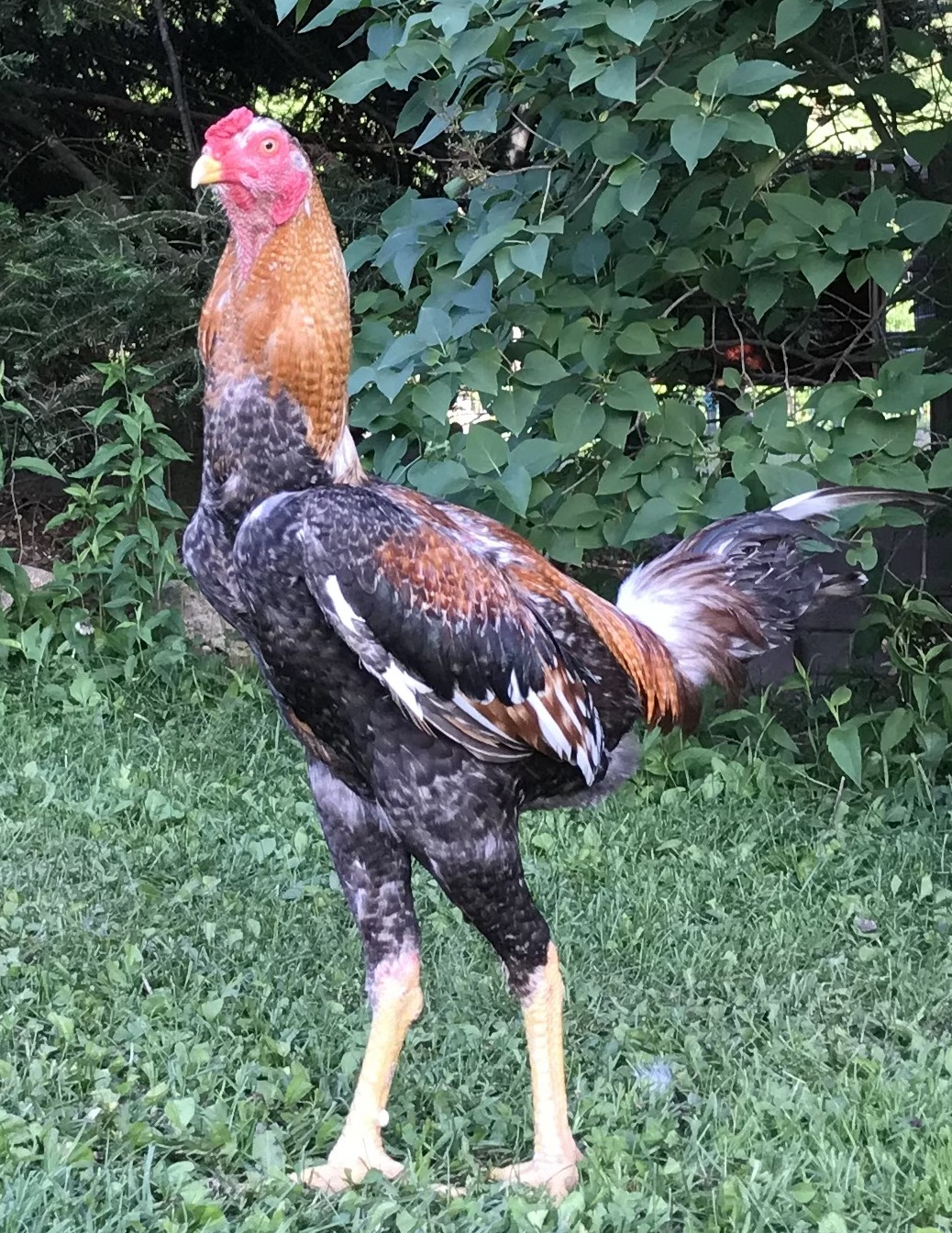
- Country of origin: Brazil
- Standard: ABRACIG (in Portuguese)

Traits
- Weight: Male: minimum 4.5 kg; Female: minimum 3 kg
- Skin color: yellow
- Egg color: white, beige, red, blue or green
- Comb type: pea (high or low) or ball

Classification
- Chicken; Gallus gallus domesticus

The Índio Gigante (Note: The word índio in Brazil refers to indigenous Brazilians and their culture; gigante means 'giant') is a Brazilian breed of domestic chicken. It is one of the largest chicken breeds in the world, particularly in terms of height.

== History ==
The Índio Gigante originated in Brazil around the late 1980s or early 1990s in the states of Minas Gerais and Goiás.

It was created by crossbreeding large gamecocks — such as the Indian Game, the Shamo and the Malay — with caipira chickens (rustic mixed breeds).

The breed association – the Associação Brasileira de Criadores de Índio Gigante — publishes a breed standard and hopes that the breed will receive official recognition; it would be the first pure breed of chicken to originate from Brazil.

"Índio Gigante" is Portuguese for "Giant Indian"; "Índio" in Brazil refers to indigenous Brazilians and their culture (see also Native American name controversy).

== Behavior ==
Despite being the largest chickens in the world they are extreme docile especially the roosters.
