= Hikki =

Hikki may refer to:

- Slang for the Japanese word hikikomori, a person who lives a reclusive life from society in their room
- Hikaru Utada (born 1983), Japanese-American pop singer-songwriter

== See also ==
- Hiki (disambiguation)
- Hikkim, India
