= Holy Cross Cemetery, Berlin-Mariendorf =

Lutheran church operated cemetery in Berlin, Germany

Coordinates: 52.447990°N 13.391526°E

Friedhof Zum Heiligen Kreuz
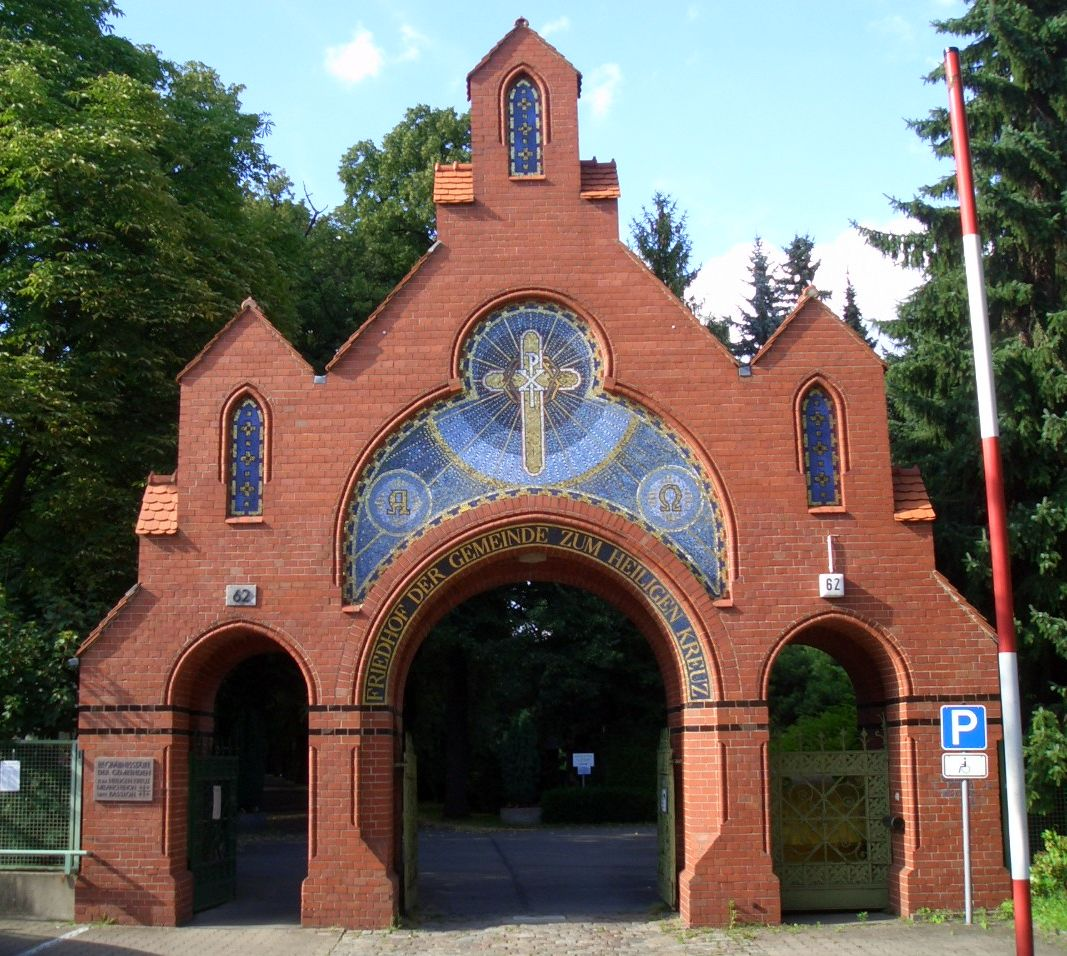
- The cemetery gates
- Interactive map of Friedhof Zum Heiligen Kreuz

Details
- Established: 1890
- Location: Berlin
- Country: Germany
- Type: Protestant cemetery
- Owned by: Evangelischen Friedhofsverbandes Berlin Stadtmitte
- Website: https://evfbs.de/index.php?id=469

The Holy Cross Evangelical Lutheran Cemetery (German: Evangelischer Friedhof Zum Heiligen Kreuz) is a historic Lutheran burial ground in Mariendorf district of Berlin. The cemetery is owned and operated by the Evangelical Church in Berlin, Brandenburg and Silesian Upper Lusatia.

== History and description ==
The Evangelical Lutheran Holy Cross and Melanchthon parishes in Berlin-Kreuzberg purchased land in Mariendorf for the purpose of burying the deceased parishioners of their congregations, which at that time still belonged to the Teltow district, and the cemetery was inaugurated in 1890. In 1892–1893, a neo-Gothic brick cemetery chapel was built by the German architect Gustav Erdmann. The cemetery sexton's cottage next to the main entrance was built in 1893–1894. The beautiful entrance gate, made of brick and decorated with mosaics, was built in 1902–1903.

The cemetery along with the chapel, the mortuary, the sexton's cottage, the fence and the entrance gate are all protected monuments.

== Selected notable burials ==
- Karl Russ (1833–1899), Prussian pharmacist, aviculturist, author of bird-keeping books, and the founding editor of the world's first bird-fancier magazine Die Gefiederte Welt.
- Rudolf Wissell (1869–1962), German politician in the Social Democratic Party of Germany (SPD).

== Gallery ==
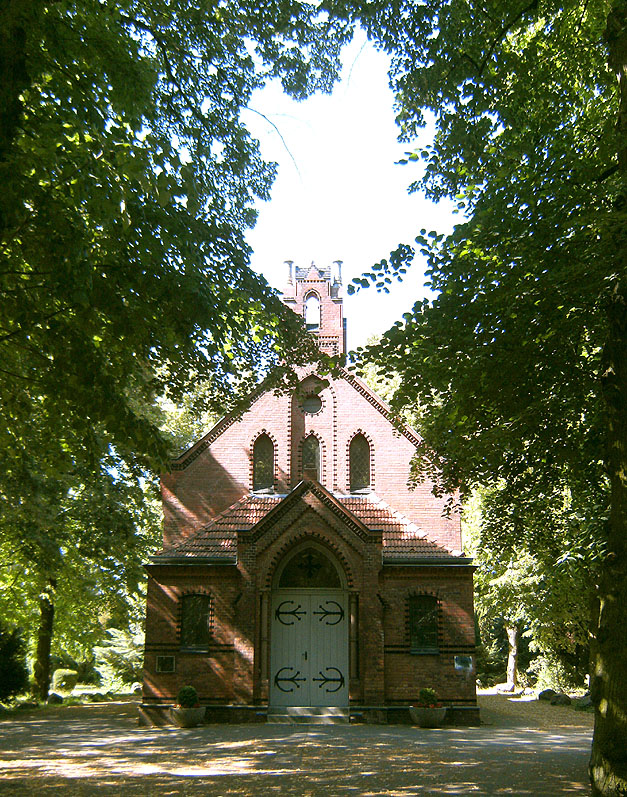

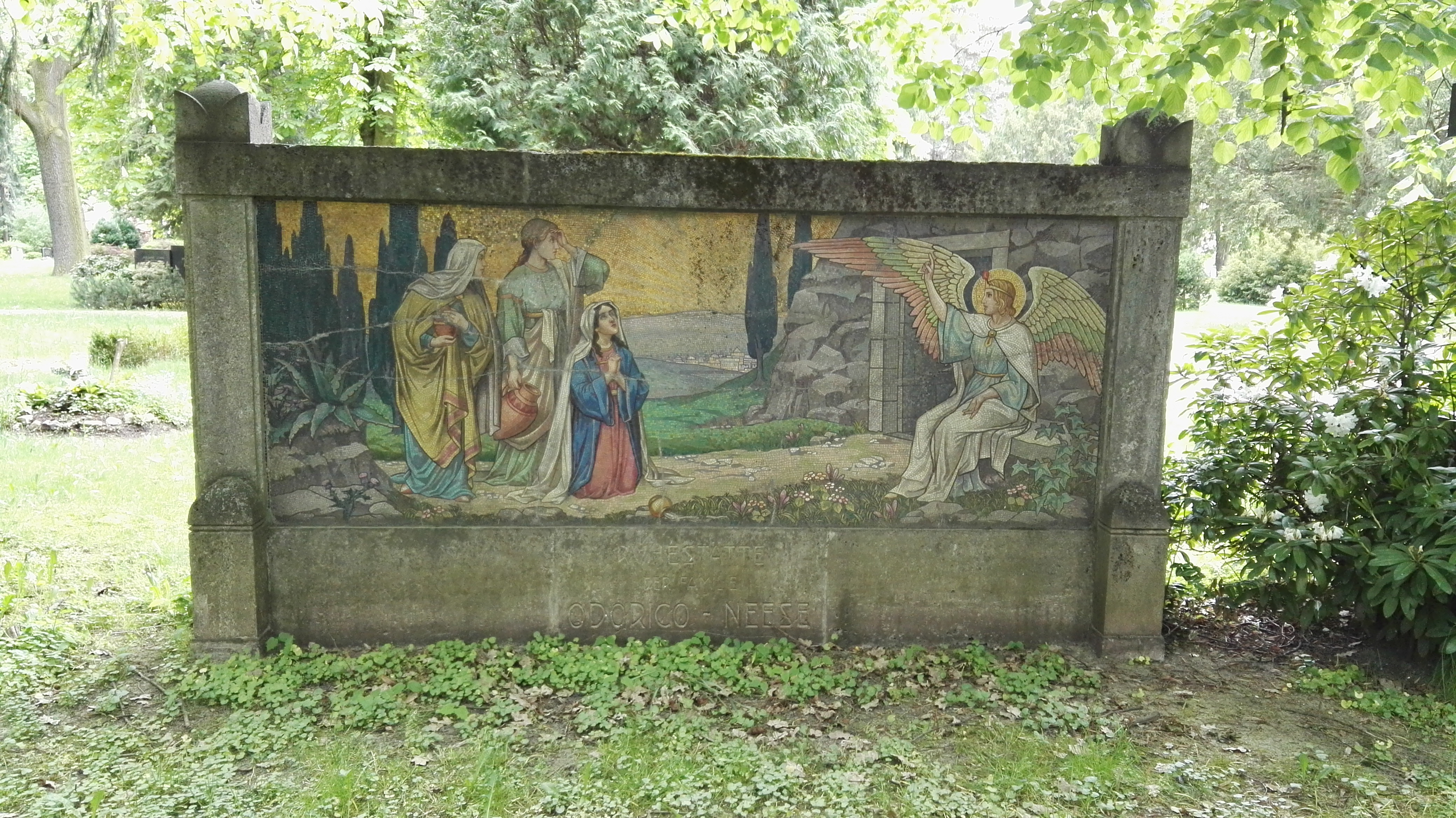

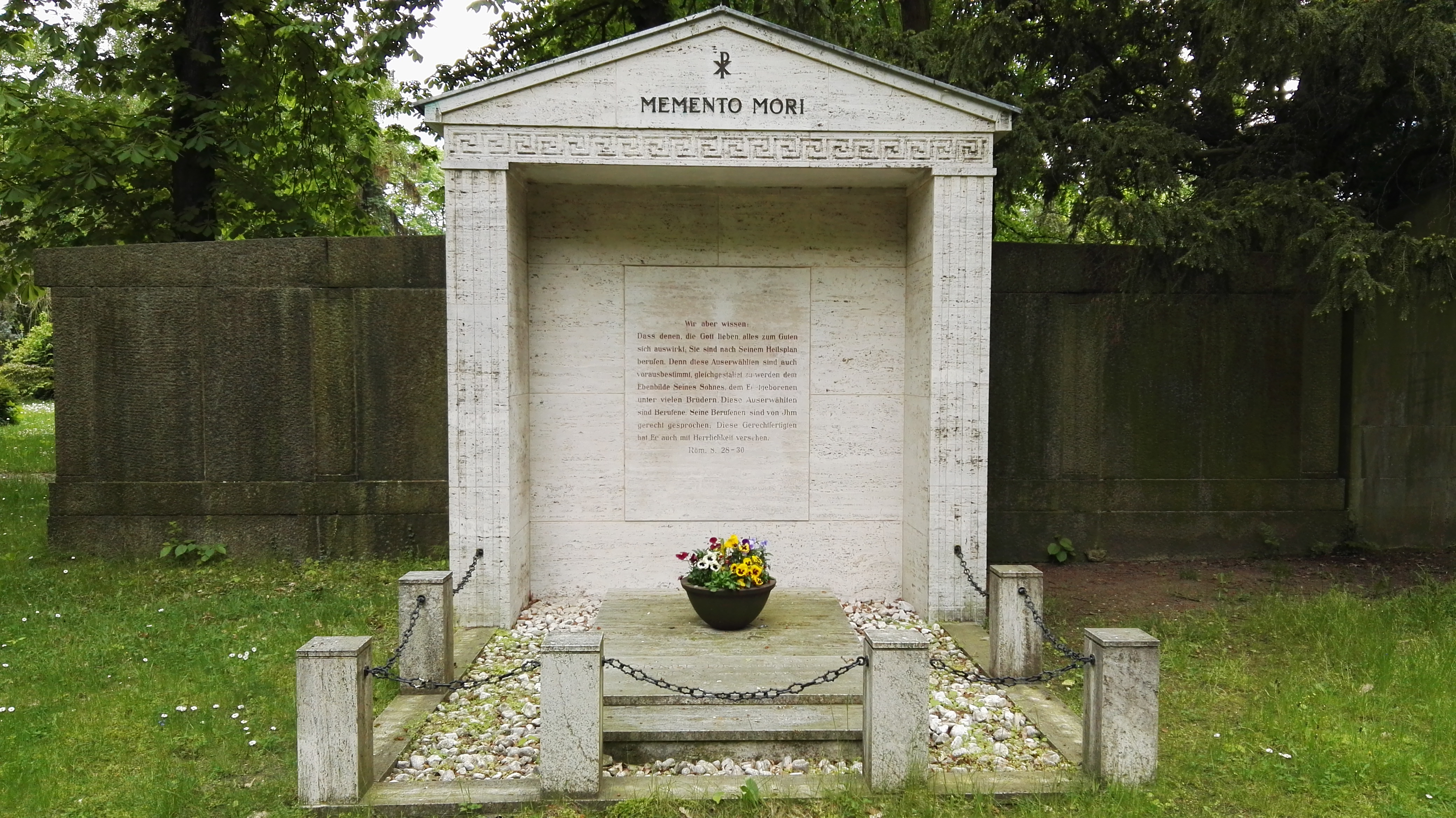
