= Bergische Schlotterkamm =

German breed of chicken

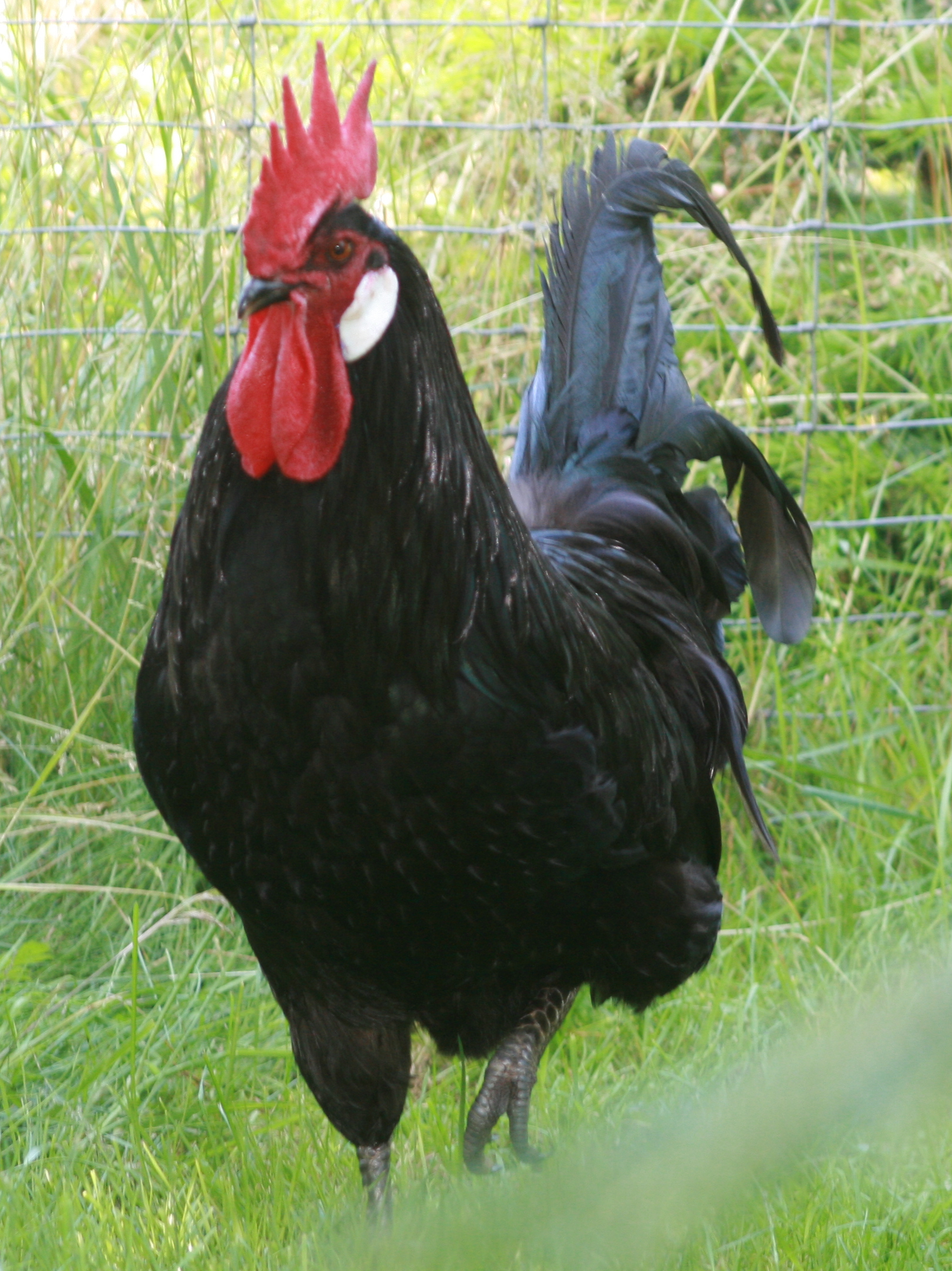
- Cock

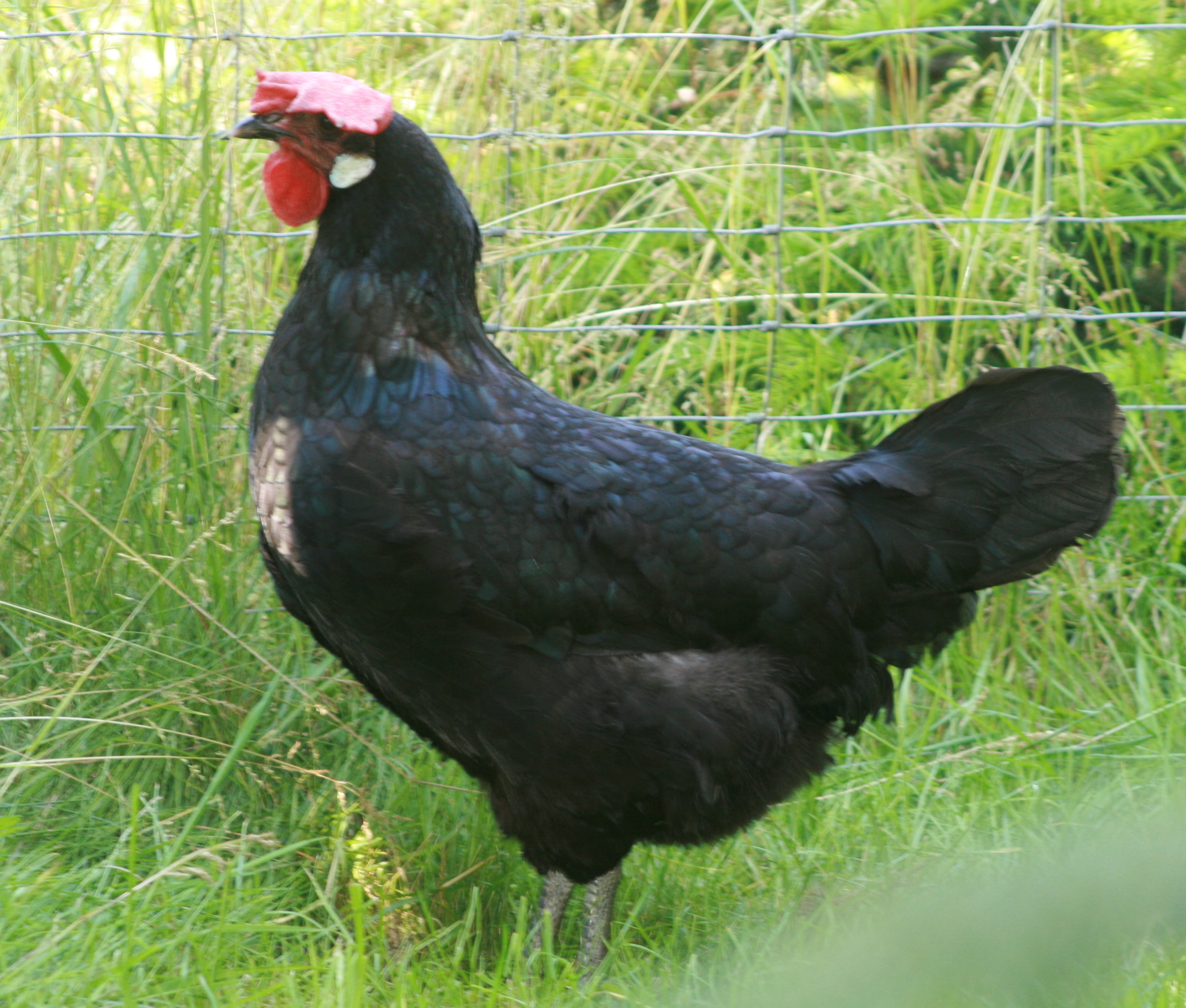
- Hen
- Conservation status: FAO (2007): not listed; GEH: extremely endangered
- Other names: Elberfelder
- Country of origin: Germany
- Use: dual-purpose

Traits
- Weight: Male: 2.0-2.75 kg; Female: 1.75-2.25 kg
- Egg colour: white
- Comb type: single

Classification
- EE: yes
- Chicken; Gallus gallus domesticus

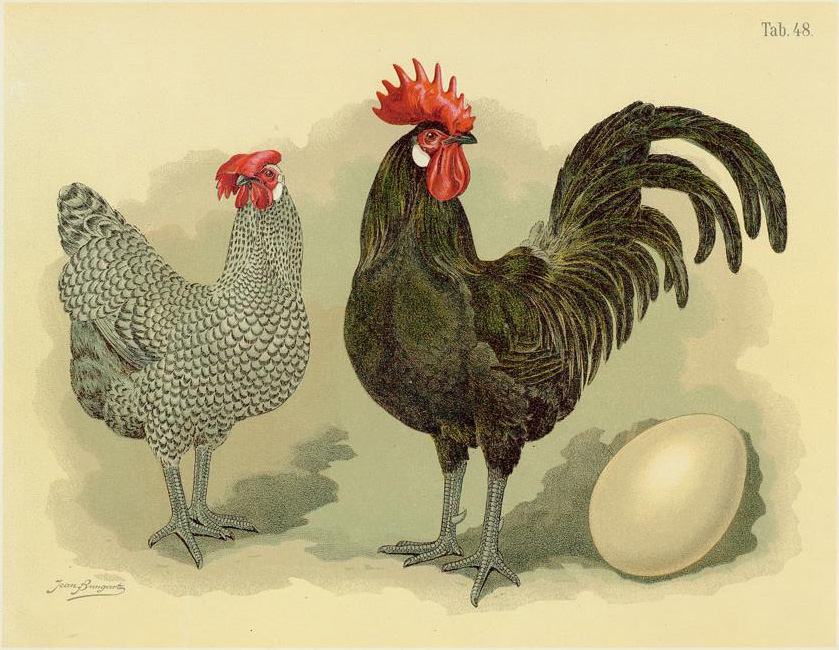
Historical Illustration with a cuckoo hen and a black cock (Jean Bungartz, 1885)

The Bergische Schlotterkamm (German pronunciation: [ˌbɛʁɡɪʃə ˈʃlɔtɐˌkam]) is an old and endangered German breed of domestic chicken. It originates from the Bergisches Land, in the state of North Rhine-Westphalia in western Germany, and is one of three chicken breeds from that area, the others being the Bergische Kräher and the German creeper ("Krüper").

== History ==
The Schlotterkamm has been known since the eighteenth century and is probably the result of crossing imported Spanish birds with local Bergische Kräher stock. At the beginning of the nineteenth century the breed experienced competition from imported multi-purpose breeds such as the Minorca, and became almost extinct. A breed association, the Vereinigung der Züchter Bergischer Hühnerrassen, was established in 1916.

In the twenty-first century the Bergische Schlotterkamm is an endangered breed. In 2001 it was an "endangered breed of the year" of the Gesellschaft zur Erhaltung alter und gefährdeter Haustierrassen; it is listed in category I, "extremely endangered", on the Rote Liste of that organisation. In 2013 the total population was around 250.

A bantam version of the Schlotterkamm was created in the late twentieth century by cross-breeding bantam Bergische Kräher and Thüringer Barthuhn birds. It is found in one plumage colour only, silver-laced black, and is even rarer than the full-sized Schlotterkamm.

== Characteristics ==
The Schlotterkamm is a medium-sized dual-purpose chicken. The shape is long and somewhat rectangular. It has a single comb which flops from one side to the other; it is this that gave the breed its name. Four plumage colours – cuckoo, silver-laced black, gold-laced black and black – have been recognised since 1896. The old cuckoo variant had virtually disappeared by 1922, and the white Schlotterkamm disappeared as the Leghorn breed became more widespread.

== Use ==
The Schlotterkamm is a dual-purpose breed, reared both for eggs and for meat. Hens lay about 150 eggs per year; the eggs are white and weigh about 55 g. The hens have little tendency to broodiness.
