= Denizli chicken =

Turkish breed of chicken

Denizli
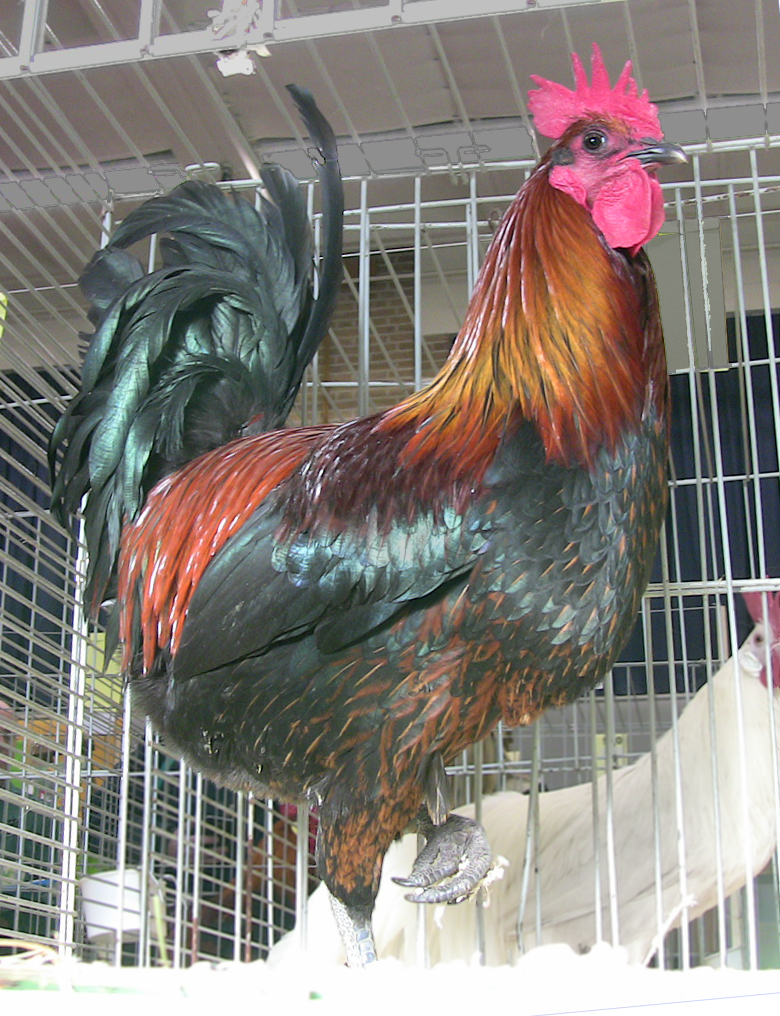
- Cock bird

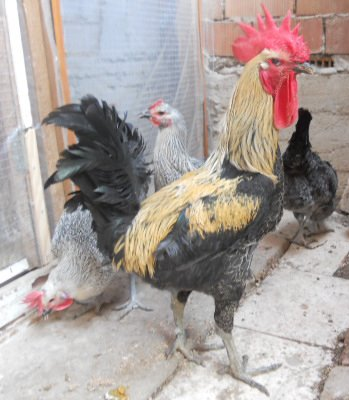
- A gold cock and silver hens
- Country of origin: Turkey
- Distribution: Turkey
- Use: Multipurpose

Traits
- Comb type: single (big comb/small comb)

Classification
- PCGB: rare long crowers
- Chicken; Gallus gallus domesticus

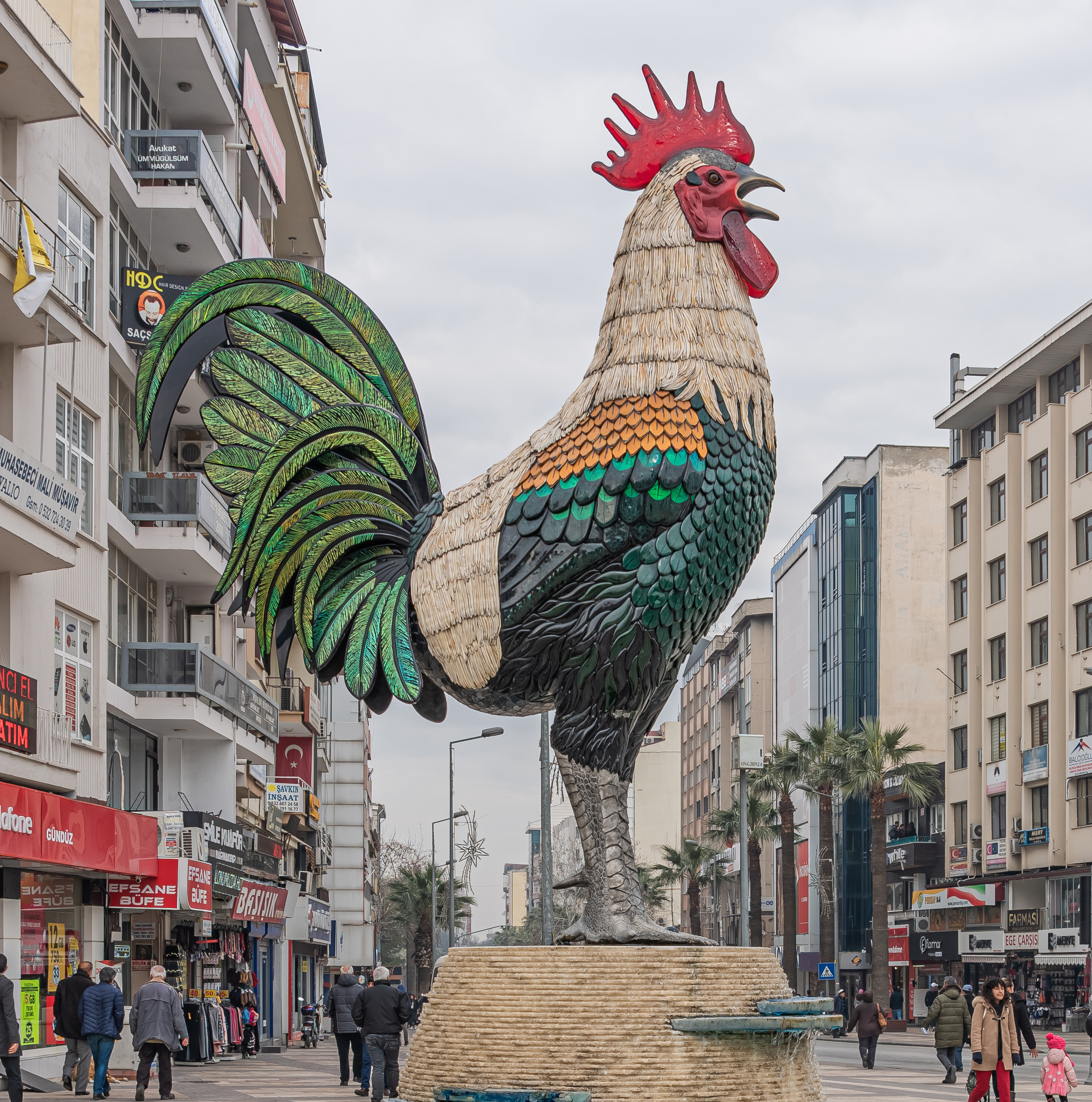
Statue in Denizli

The Denizli is a Turkish breed of long-crowing chicken. It is closely associated with the city of Denizli, in the Aegean region of south-west Turkey. Cock birds may be capable of a crow of 20–25 seconds in their first year.

== History ==
It has been the symbol of both Denizli City and Province for at least nine hundred years, after excavations at Laodicea on the Lycus revealed a 900-year-old relief of the cities symbol. In 2013 the largest glass sculpture in Turkey, a giant Denizli rooster in Delikliçınar Square, Denizli City, was unveiled to celebrate this find following a survey to decide on a statue for the newly renovated square.

The population has been noted as declining, and an active conservation programme is now in progress by the Lalahan Central Livestock Research Institute.

== Characteristics ==
The breed is divided into 3 groups based on colour, body structure, and comb types. It is described as having black eyes, dark grey or purple leg colour, with silver or red hackles and sometimes red feathering on the wings. They weigh 3–3.5 kg.

A video of a Denizli rooster crowing entitled "death metal rooster", went viral on YouTube in 2010. Discovery Channel covered the video explaining how roosters crow for such a long duration. The video was nominated in the O Music Awards 2011 for Best Animal Performance.
