= Kokok Balenggek =

Indonesian chicken breed

- Country of origin: Indonesia
- Use: eggs, meat

Traits
- Skin color: wild type pattern (e+); plain feather (ss) golden flick feather (ss); yellow shank coloured (Id_)
- Egg color: brown
- Comb type: single

Classification

Notes
- The hens crow like roosters
- Chicken; Gallus gallus domesticus

Kokok Balenggek is a lesser-known chicken breed originating from the landscapes of Indonesia, particularly found in the West Sumatra region.

It is a crowing chicken - which is a rare phenomenon where hens crow like roosters.

The most qualitative traits of Kokok Balenggek chickens include colored plumage, a wild-type pattern, plain feathers, golden sickle feathers, yellow shank color, and a single comb.

It is a long-crowing chicken breed, characterised by the unusually long-drawn-out crow of the cocks, which may in some cases last for up to 60 seconds.
