= Karl Russ =

Prussian pharmacist, aviculturist, author and editor

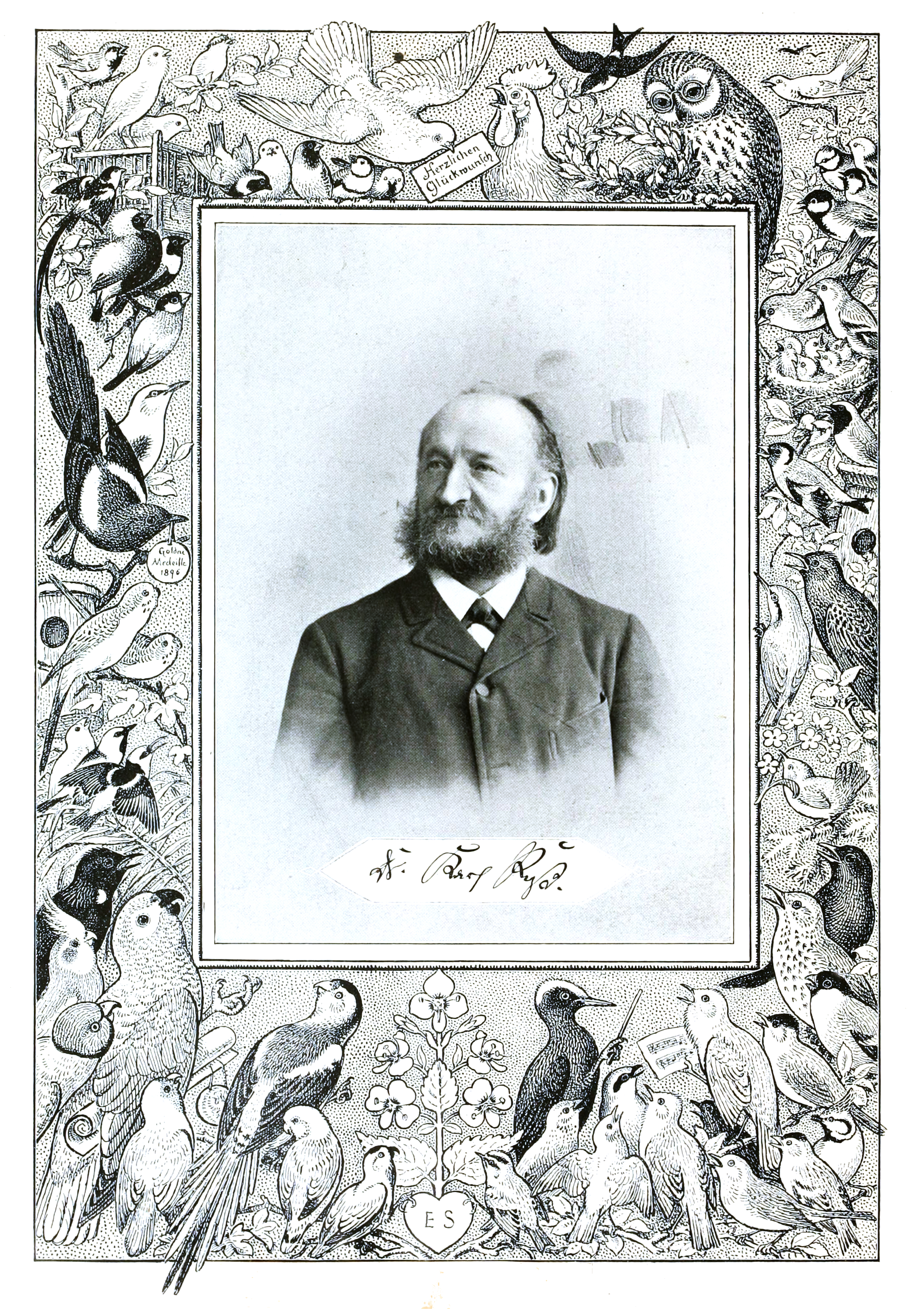
Commemorative portrait from Gefiederte Welt, c. 1872

Karl Friedrich Otto Ruß (January 14, 1833, Baldenburg – September 29, 1899, Berlin) was a Prussian pharmacist, aviculturist, author of bird-keeping books, and the founding editor of the world's first bird-fancier magazine Die Gefiederte Welt. Along with Bruno Dürigen, he also founded the magazine Isis in 1876. He sometimes wrote under the pseudonym "Berthold Schwarz". He was among the few who managed to breed the now extinct Carolina parakeets in captivity.

== Biography ==
Russ was born in a family of pharmacists and following the family tradition, he studied pharmacy and passed the test for apothecaries in Berlin in 1862. He received a doctorate from Rostock University in 1866 and worked briefly as a pharmacist but was forced to give up due to a laryngeal problem. He had been interested in ornithology from a young age and wished to make knowledge more widely available and had been especially influenced by the work of Emil Adolf Rossmässler. He began to write, among his first works in 1859 being a poem lamenting the death of Alexander von Humboldt. He moved to Berlin in 1867 to write books, his first writings were on the freedom of the press and worker's rights and he showed support for Hermann Schulze-Delitzsch. As an aviculturist he maintained nearly 150 bird species and in the course of a decade managed to breed nearly 63 species including several African weaverbirds for the first time in captivity. He even had the now extinct Carolina parakeet laying several clutches of three to five eggs. He founded the popular science magazine Isis along with Bruno Dürigen in 1876 that covered a wide range of topics. In 1879 he was concerned about the hunting of hares in Germany as they had suffered from bad climatic conditions leading to the death of many in the previous two seasons. He advocated the protection of wild birds in 1880. The magazine Die gefiederte Welt (the feathered world) was a popular aviculturist's magazine (and a first of its kind) that he founded in 1872. Russ noted that of the 800 to 1000 African grey parrots brought into German around 1877, nearly 600 to 750 died from psittacosis and other illnesses. It was for sometime edited by his namesake son who predeceased him by a few months. He published several books on the management and care of cagebirds. Some of his books were translated into English such as The Speaking Parrots. He died from a heart attack at his home in Belle Alliance Strasse, Berlin and was buried in the Holy Cross Cemetery, Berlin-Mariendorf.

Otto Finsch named Ploceus russi after him in 1877 but it is now treated as a synonym of Quelea quelea. Anton Reichenow named Lagonost⁮icta russi in 1875 which is a synonym for Lagonosticta senegala.
