= Yakido =

Japanese breed of fighting cock

- Other names: Ygido; Hachikido
- Country of origin: Japan
- Use: cock-fighting

Traits
- Weight: Male: 2.1–2.6 kg; Female: 1.7–2.1 kg
- Skin colour: red
- Egg colour: cream to brown
- Comb type: triple

Classification
- APA: no
- EE: yes
- PCGB: Asian hard feather
- Chicken; Gallus gallus domesticus

The Yakido (Japanese: 八木戸鶏) is a Japanese breed of fighting chicken. It belongs to the Shamo group of breeds. It was bred in the Kansai region in southern Honshu in the mid-nineteenth century. It was made a Natural Monument of Japan in 1950.

== History ==
The Yakido derives from the Shamo group of fighting chicken breeds, which are thought to descend from birds of Malay type brought from Thailand in the early part of the seventeenth century, during the Edo period. The Yakido was bred in Mie Prefecture, in Kansai region in southern Honshu, in the mid-nineteenth century, in the late Edo period. It was made a Natural Monument of Japan under law 214 of 30 May 1950.

== Characteristics ==
The Yakido is a small bird of gamecock type. It is muscular and strong, and stands very upright. It has hard, close feathers, and holds its wings close to the body. It is found in only one colour, black. The beak and legs are yellow, sometimes with black markings. The comb is triple.

The Yakido is intermediate in weight between standard-sized and bantam chickens. In the United Kingdom, but not in Germany, it is considered a bantam.

== Use ==
The Yakido was created as a sparring-partner for larger fighting-cocks. Hens lay about 80 cream-coloured or brown eggs per year; egg weight is about 50 g. This breed is used in creating Kumano Jidori(F3 hybrid used for meat production) as one of great-grandfathers.
