= Ayam Ketawa =

Breed of chicken

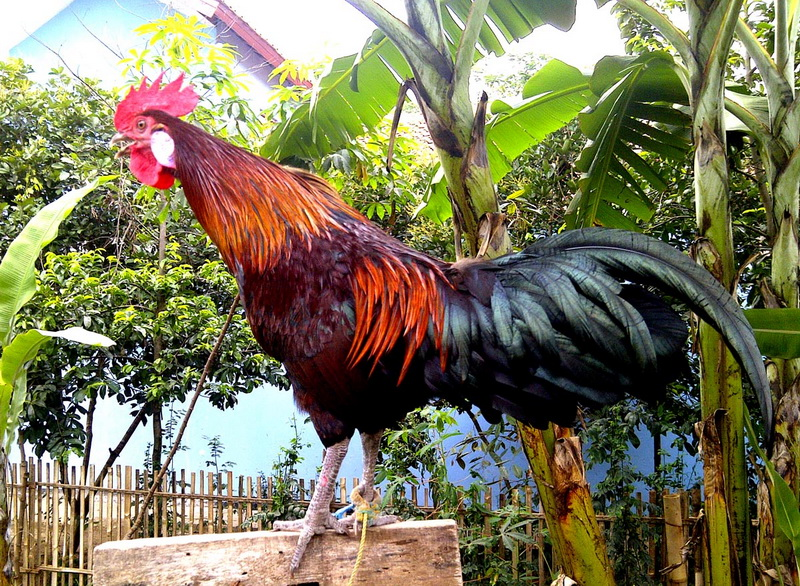
- Other names: Manu Gaga'; Gaga'; Ayam Gaga
- Country of origin: Indonesia

Traits
- Weight: Male: 2–3 kg; Female: 1–2 kg
- Egg color: White to light brown
- Comb type: Variable

Classification
- Chicken; Gallus gallus domesticus

Ayam Ketawa, or "laughing chicken", is a breed of chicken originating from the area of Sidenreng Rappang in South Sulawesi, Indonesia. It is one of several breeds of long-crowing chicken prized for the clarity and unusual length of their crows. The crow of Ayam Ketawa cocks has an unusual similarity to a human laugh. The breed was originally held as a status symbol of the Buginese royal family, but has entered into higher popularity in recent times since the fall of the monarchy. Today it is still seen as a symbol of courage, social status and heroism and they compete in contests for the most perfect crow, for the Governor of Sulawesi Cup.

== Names ==
In Indonesian the breed is known as Ayam Ketawa, meaning "laughing chicken", or as Ayam Gaga; in Buginese it is called Manu' Gaga' or just Gaga' (literally Stammering Chicken).

Breeders have various names for types of Ayam Ketawa based on the length and frequency of their crows and "laughs", such as dangdut (slow), gretek (fast), slow, and disco.
