= Long-crowing chicken =

Type of chicken

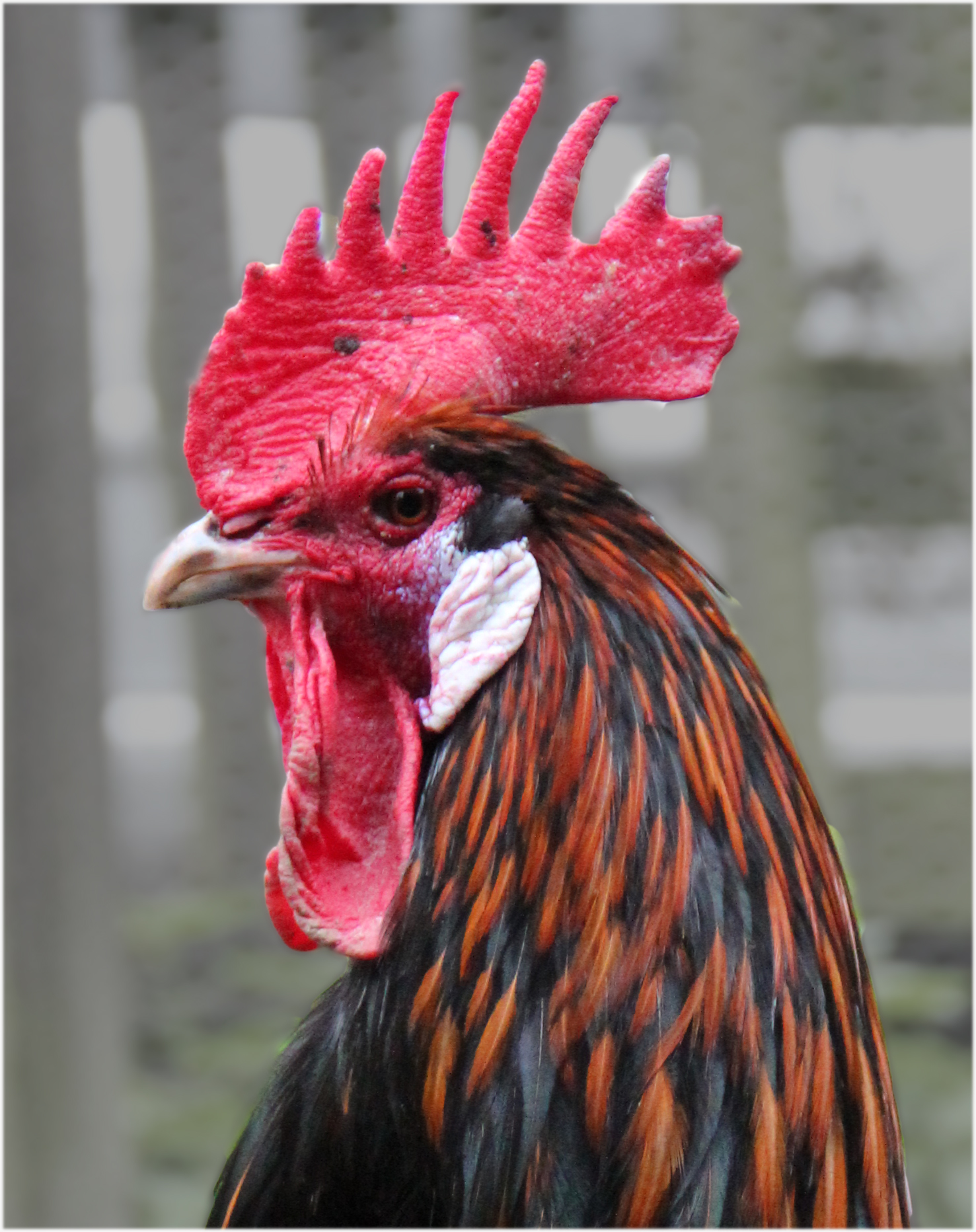
Bergische Kräher

The prolonged crowing of a Bergische Crower

Long-crowing chicken breeds are characterised by the unusually long-drawn-out crow of the cocks, which may in some cases last for up to 60 seconds. The oldest references to long-crowing cocks are from China. Long-crowing breeds are found in the Far East, in Turkey, in the Balkans and in western Germany.

== History ==
The earliest reference to long-crowing cocks is in the writings of Li Ji, dating from the reign of Emperor Xuan of Han (75–49 BC). In Japan the first references are from the early eighth century, in the Kojiki and Nihon Shoki chronicles. The Bergische Kräher breed of Germany was imported from the Balkans in Mediaeval times. In Russia the Jurlower or Yurlov Crower was bred in the nineteenth century.

== Characteristics ==
Chicken breeds which to a greater or lesser extent display long-crowing behaviour include the Berat, Bergische Kräher, Jurlower and Kosova Long Crower breeds of eastern Europe, the Denizli of Turkey, and the Koeyoshi, Tomaru, Tôtenko and Utaicham breeds of Japan.

In general, long-crowing breeds are tall, with long legs and neck.

== Crowing contests ==
In Germany, Indonesia and Japan, there is an established tradition of cock-crowing contests with local birds. The length of a crow is measured, but the number of crowing calls, the tone and the melody may also be judged.

== Breeds ==
Long-crowing breeds recognised world-wide include the following:

- Ayam Ketawa ("Laughing Chicken", also named "Ayam gaga")
- Ayam Pelung
- Berat, Bosnia
- Bergische Kräher (large fowl and bantam), Germany
- Denizli (Denizli horozu), Turkey
- Kokok Balenggek (Ayam Kokok Balenggek)
- Koeyoshi
- Komotini Long Crow Chicken, Greece
- Kosovo Longcrower
- Palama Crower, Greece
- Tōmaru
- Tōtenkō
- Utaicham
- Yurlov Crower
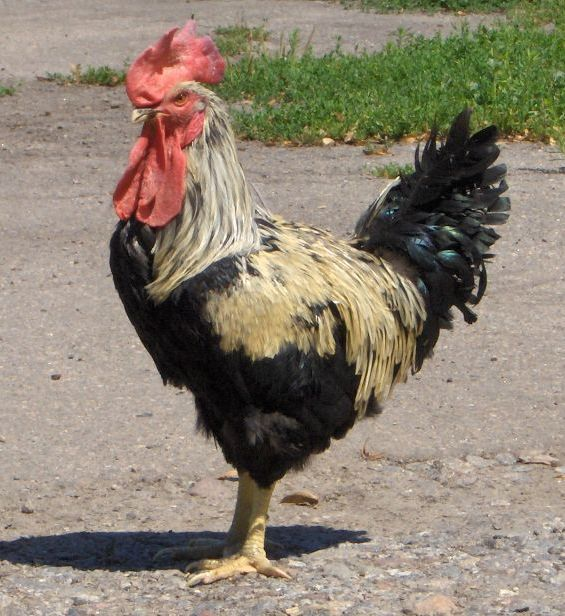
Yurlov

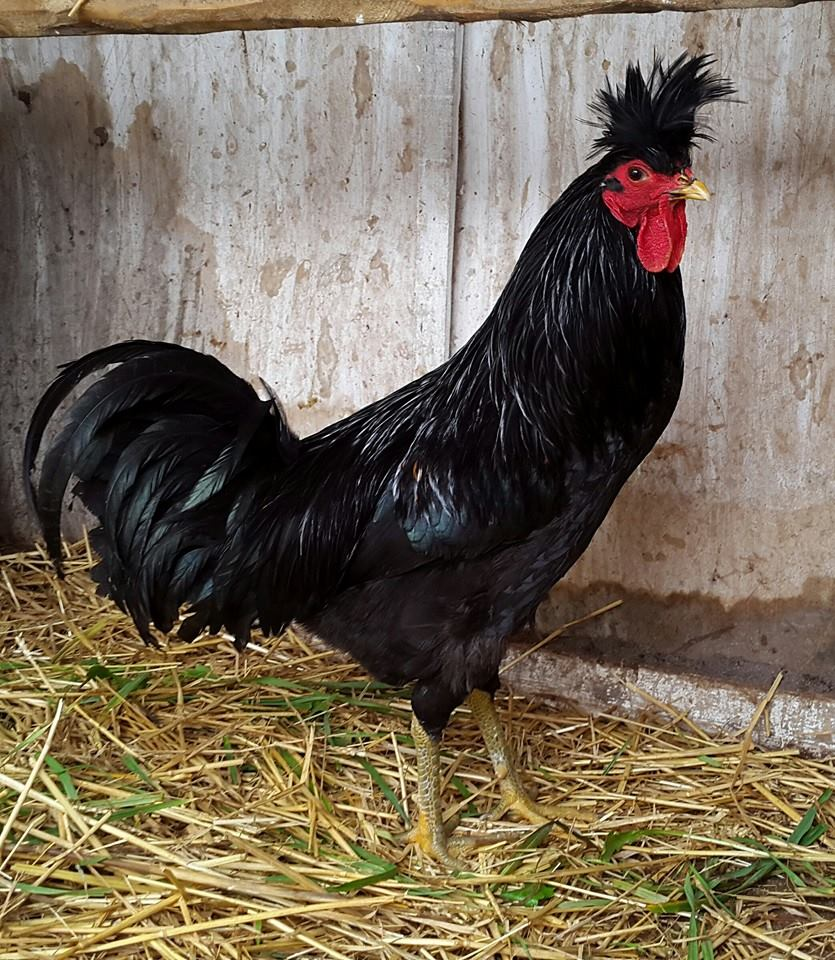
Kosovo Longcrower

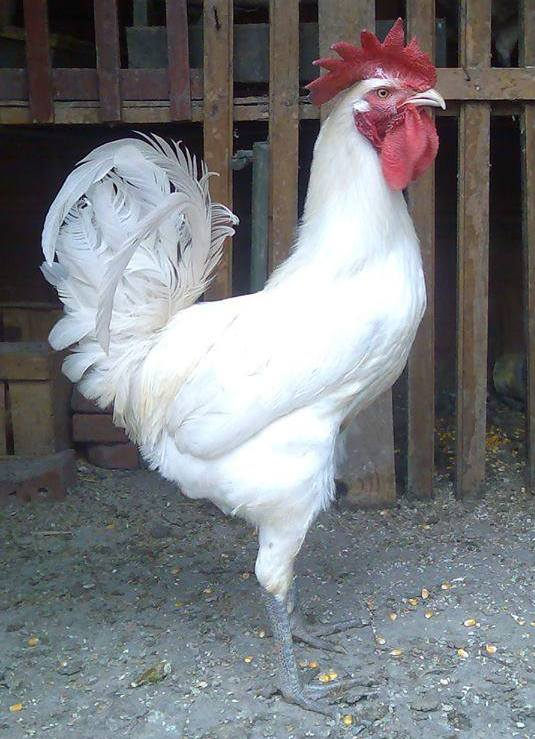
Berat

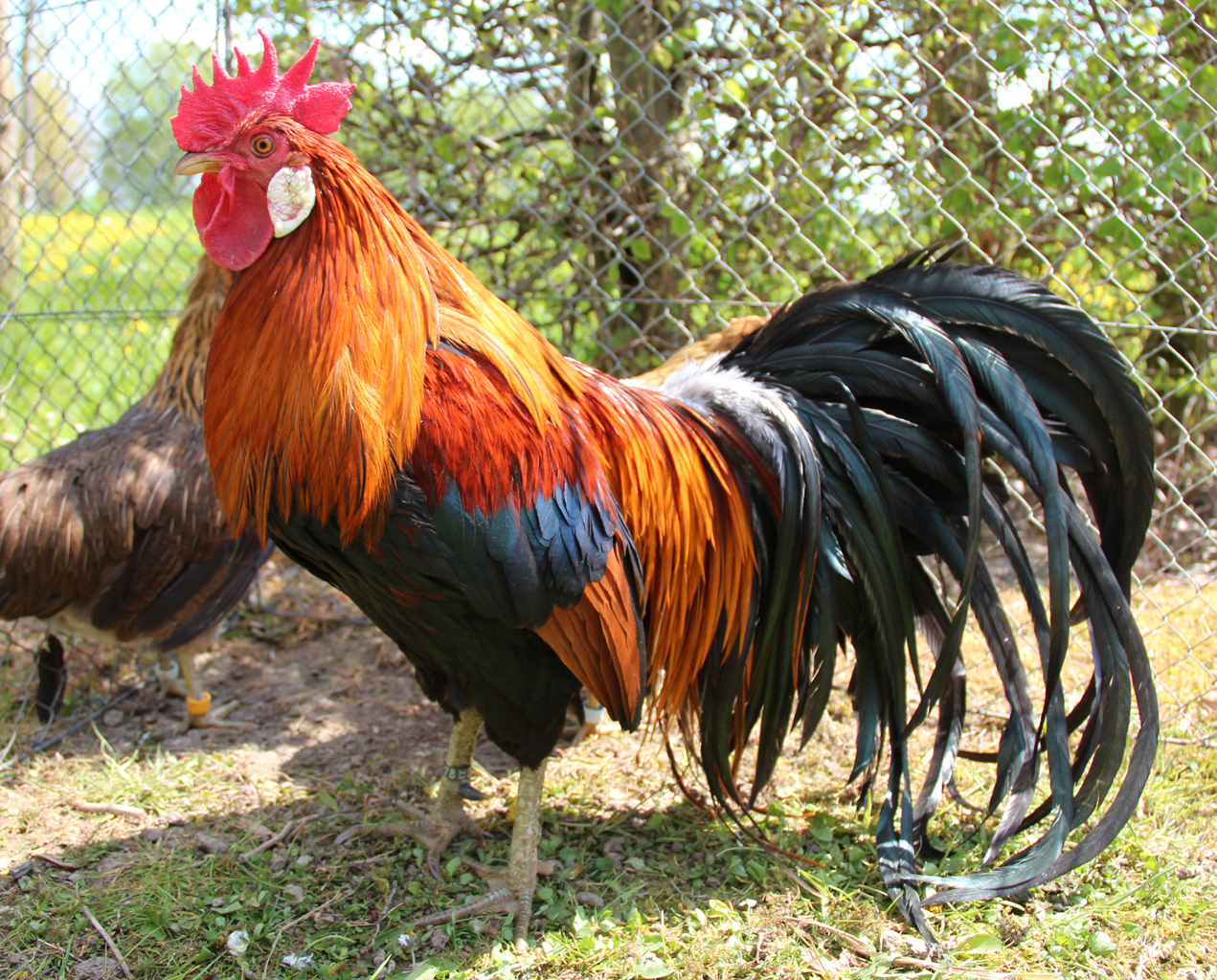
Totenko

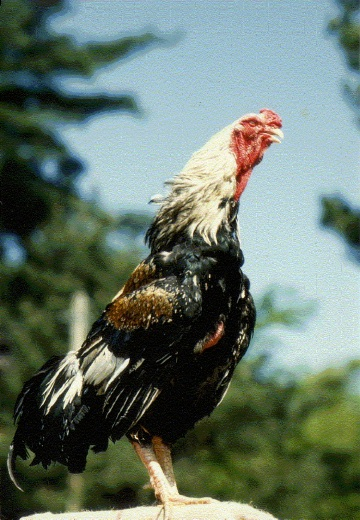
Koeyoshi
