= Yurlov (surname) =

Yurlov (Russian: Юрлов) is a Russian masculine surname, its feminine counterpart is Yurlova. It may refer to

- Daria Yurlova (born 1992), Estonian biathlete
- Ekaterina Yurlova (born 1985), Russian biathlete
- Lyudmila Yurlova (1972–2016), Russian ice hockey forward
- Marina Yurlova (1900–1984), Russian child soldier and author
