= Shamo chickens =

Group of Japanese chicken breeds

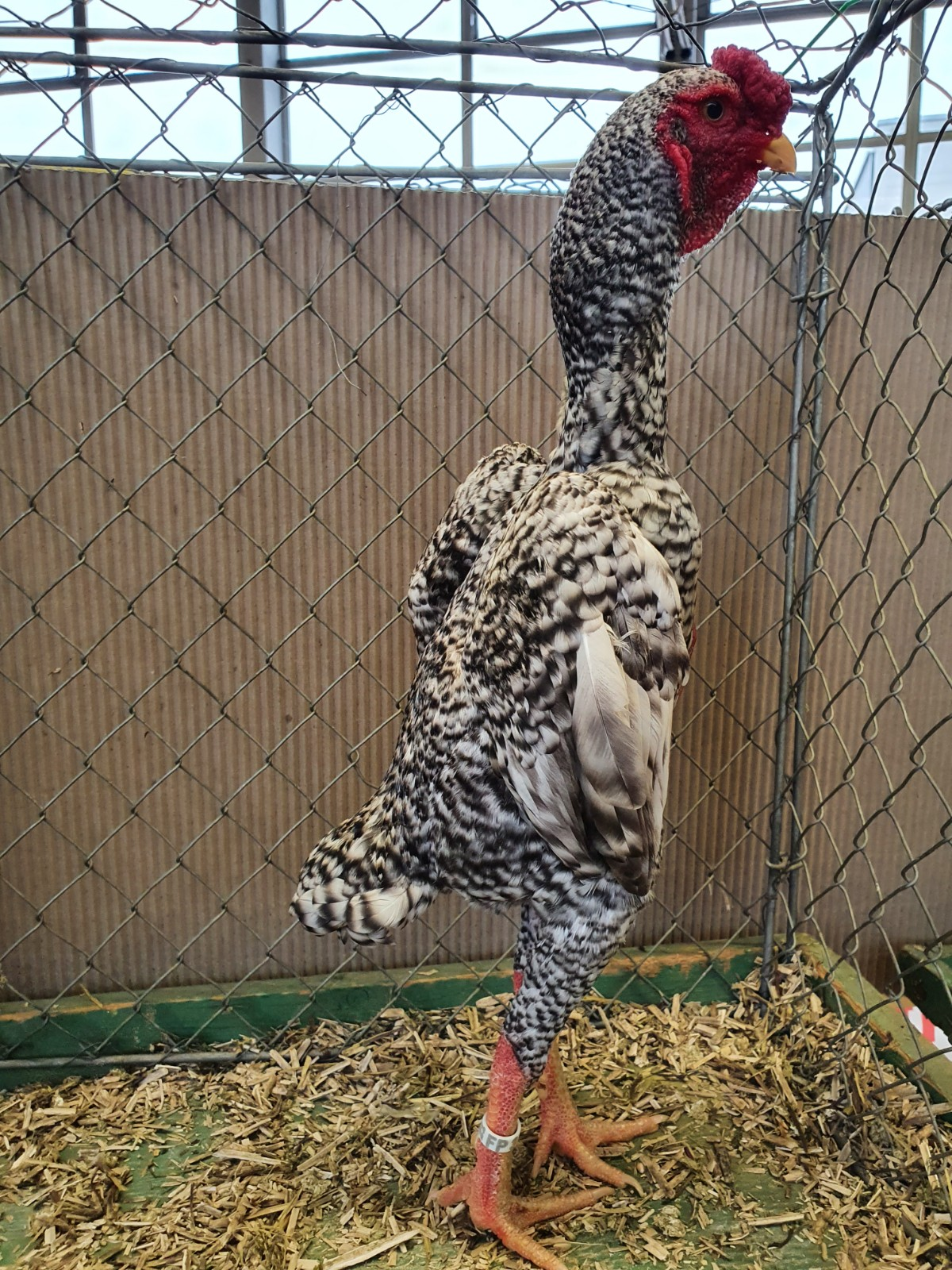
Ko-Shamo cockerel

Shamo (軍鶏) is an overall designation for game fowl in Japan. There are seven recognised breeds of Shamo chicken in Japan, all of which are designated Natural Monuments of Japan. The Shamo breeds are thought to derive from fighting chickens of Malay type brought from Thailand in the early part of the seventeenth century.

== History ==
The Shamo breeds are thought to derive from fighting chickens of Malay type brought from Thailand in the early part of the seventeenth century or early Edo period (1603–1867). The Japanese word Shamo derives from Siam, the former name of Thailand. The birds have been selectively bred for several hundred years for their fighting ability. Some were imported to Western countries in the 1970s; in the twenty-first century, the birds are reported from four countries outside Japan: Australia, Ireland, the United Kingdom and the United States.

== Breeds ==
The seven recognised Shamo breeds designated as Natural Monuments of Japan are:

- Ehigo-Nankin-Shamo, a slightly taller and more slender variant of the Nankin-Shamo from Niigata
- O-Shamo ("large Shamo", 大軍鶏)
- Kinpa
- Ko-Shamo ("small Shamo", 小軍鶏)
- Nankin-Shamo (Nankin Shamo, 南京軍鶏)
- Yakido or Ygido (八木戸鶏)
- Yamato-Shamo or Yamato Gunkei

Other Shamo variants are the Chu-Shamo ("medium Shamo", 中軍鶏) and the Chibi Shamo, the bantam of the Yamato Gunkei.

== In the West ==
In Western countries, the breed name Shamo includes both the O-Shamo and the Chu-Shamo. In the United Kingdom, different weight ranges are given in the British Poultry Standards for the two types within the Shamo breed; the Ko-Shamo, Nankin Shamo, Yakido and Yamato Gunkei are recognised as distinct breeds. The Entente Européenne recognises the Shamo, Ko-Shamo, Yakido and Yamato Gunkei, and lists the Chu-Shamo and Nankin Shamo as unrecognised. The Australian Poultry Standards list only one form of Shamo, which has a minimum weight of 3 kg. The American Poultry Association recognises the Shamo as a breed, both full-sized and bantam.
