= Bergische Kräher =

German breed of chicken

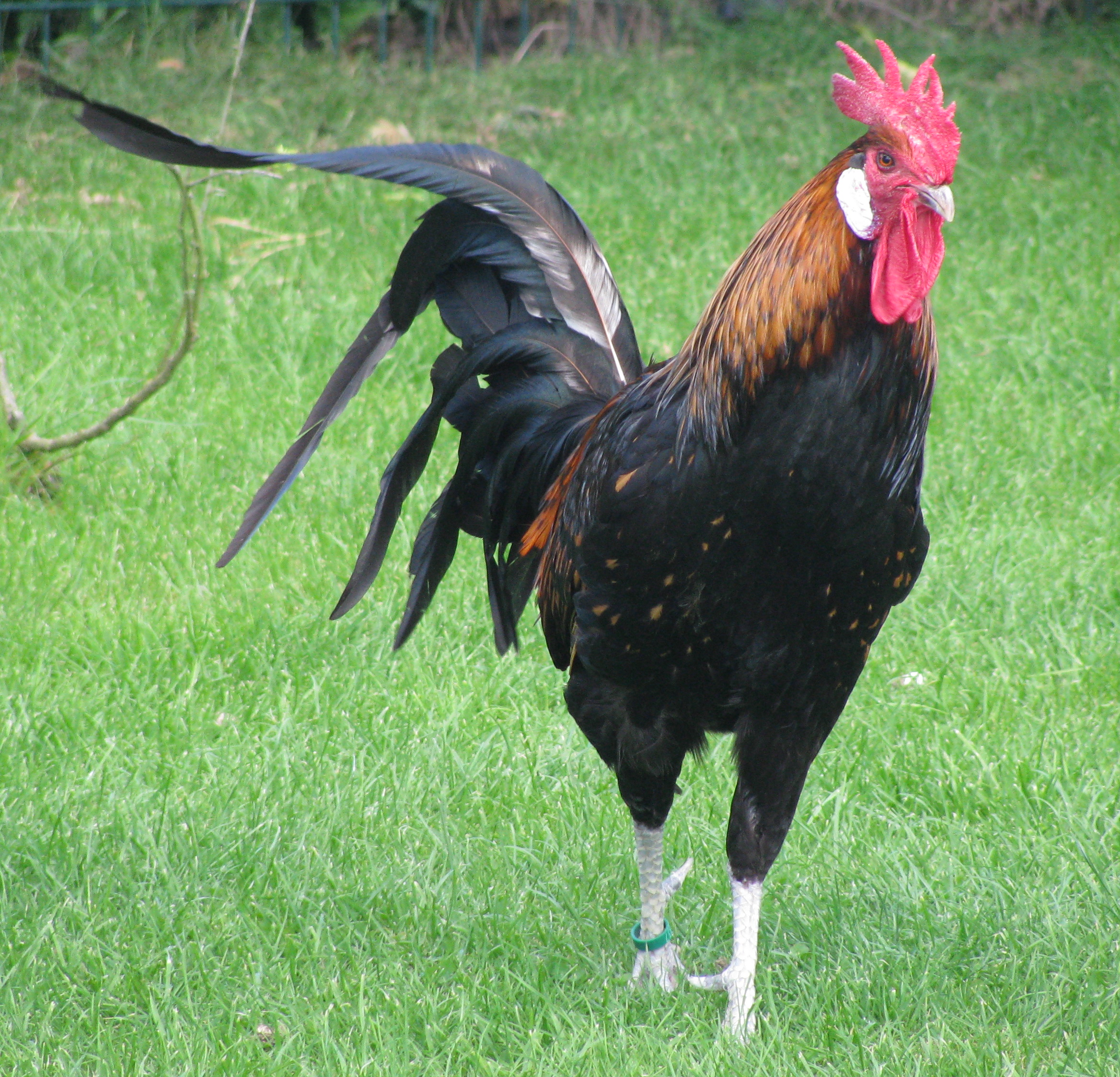
- Cock bird

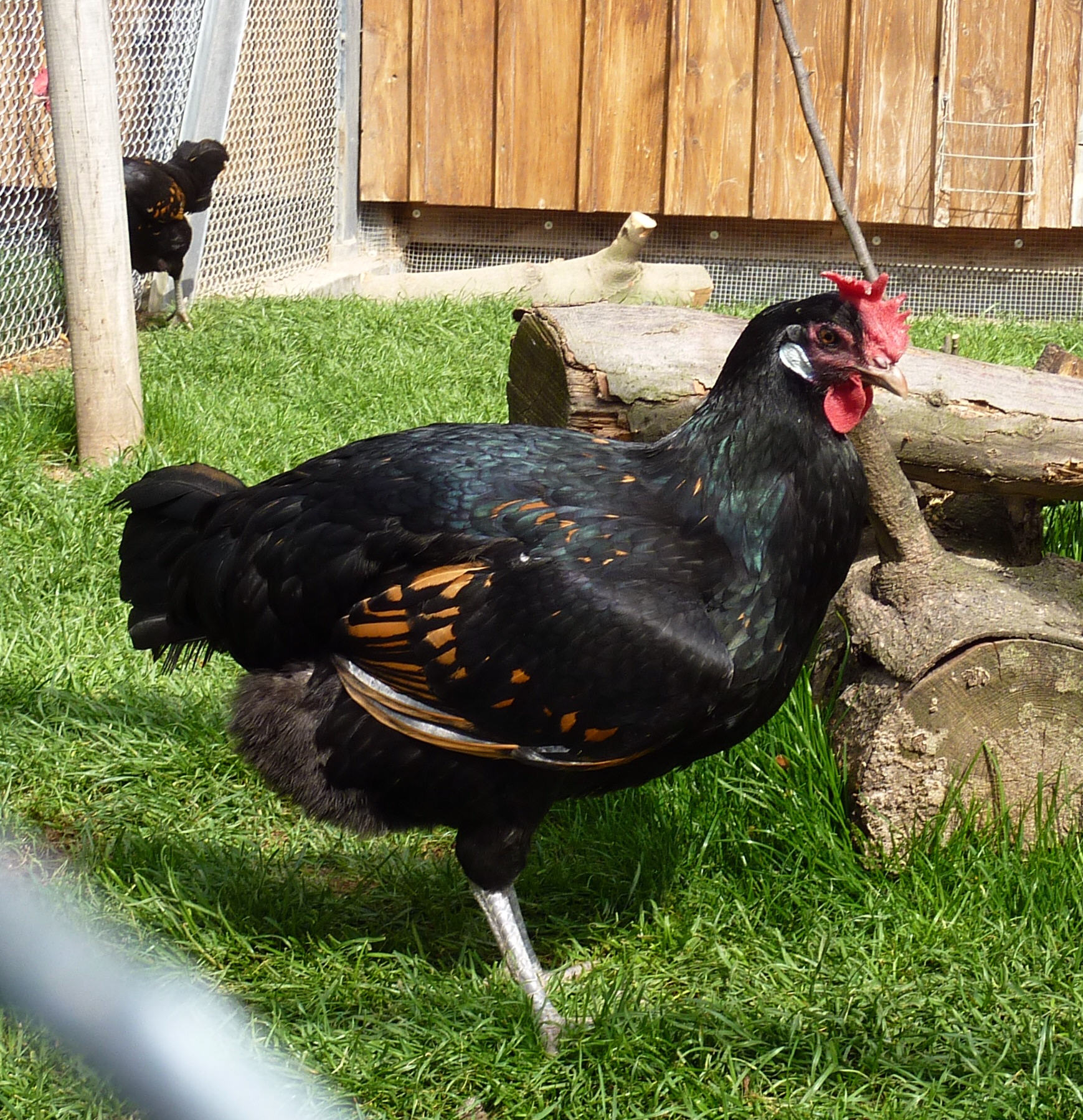
- Hen bird
- Conservation status: FAO (2007): endangered; GEH: I, extremely endangered
- Country of origin: Germany

Traits
- Weight: Male: 3–3.5 kg; Female: 2–2.5 kg
- Egg colour: white
- Comb type: single

Classification
- EE: yes
- PCGB: rare long crowers
- Chicken; Gallus gallus domesticus

A typical crow

The Bergische Kräher (Note: pronounced [ˈbɛʁɡɪʃə ˈkʁɛːɐ]; translatable as "crower of the Bergisches Land") is a German breed of domestic chicken from the Bergisches Land, in the state of North Rhine-Westphalia in western Germany. It is named for its unusually long crow, up to five times as long as that of other breeds, and belongs to the group of long-crowing chickens, which are found from south-east Europe to the Far East.

== History ==
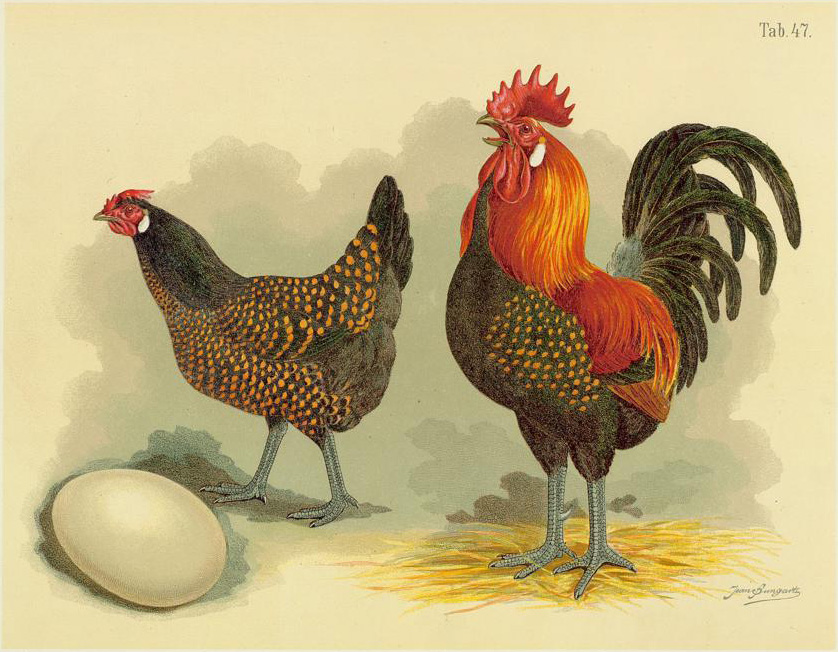
Illustration by Jean Bungartz, 1885

The Bergische Kräher has been bred in the Bergisches Land for hundreds of years, and there are various myths about its origins. It was probably brought there from south-east Europe or the Middle East at the time of the Crusades, and may have been spread through the area by Cistercian monks. It is closely related to the Bergische Schlotterkamm. Crowing contests were held for the birds, and they were selectively bred for their crowing ability. A breed association, the Kräherzüchtervereinigung, was founded in 1884, and the first breed standard dates from 1885.

Today the Bergische Kräher is a rare breed. In 2001 it was an "endangered breed of the year" of the Gesellschaft zur Erhaltung alter und gefährdeter Haustierrassen, and is listed in category I: extrem gefährdet, "extremely endangered", on the Rote Liste of that organisation. In 2009, 77 cocks and 337 hens were recorded; in 2013 the total population was 329.

== Characteristics ==
Only one plumage colouring is recognised, gold-laced black. Hen birds are black with some gold markings on the wings and breast; cocks have gold neck-hackles and maroon markings on the wings. The black colour variety is extinct, black-silver coloured birds are extremely rare. Like the Bergische Schlotterkamm, the Bergische Kräher shows typical broad lacing (German: Dobbelung) of the breast feathers. Cocks weigh 3–3.5 kg and hens 2–2.5 kg. The comb is single, the earlobes are white and the legs are slate-blue.

== Use ==
The Bergische Kräher is a dual-purpose breed, with good meat qualities. Hens lay about 130 white eggs per year, with an average weight of 56 g; they have little tendency to broodiness.

Cock crowing contests with the Bergische Kräher have been a sport in the Bergische Land for centuries. Since 1923, the breed society has organised annual crowing contests on Ascension Thursday. In these – unlike in most traditional cock crowing contests in Germany, the Netherlands and Belgium – the crow is judged for its length and beauty, rather than for its frequency.

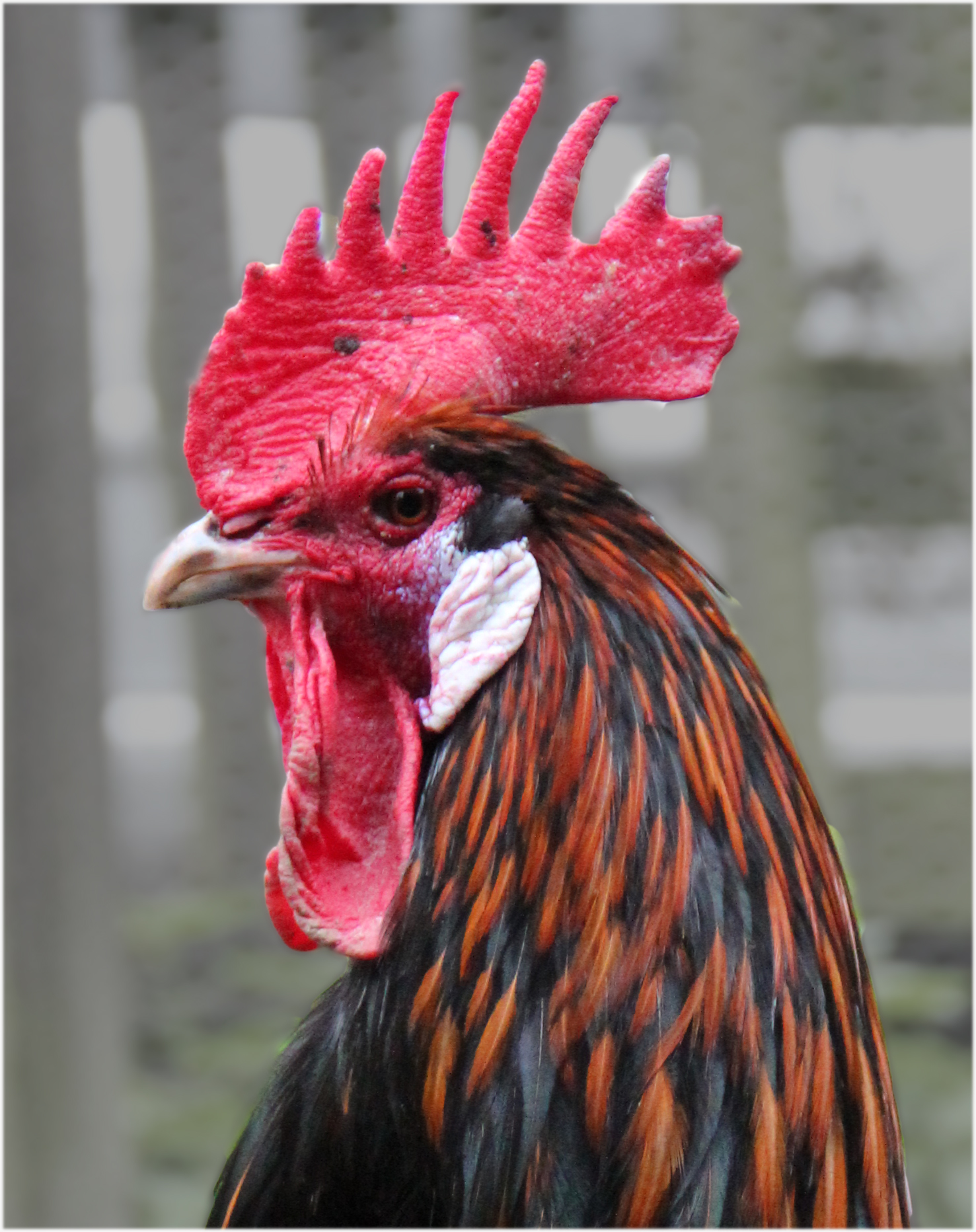
Cock bird

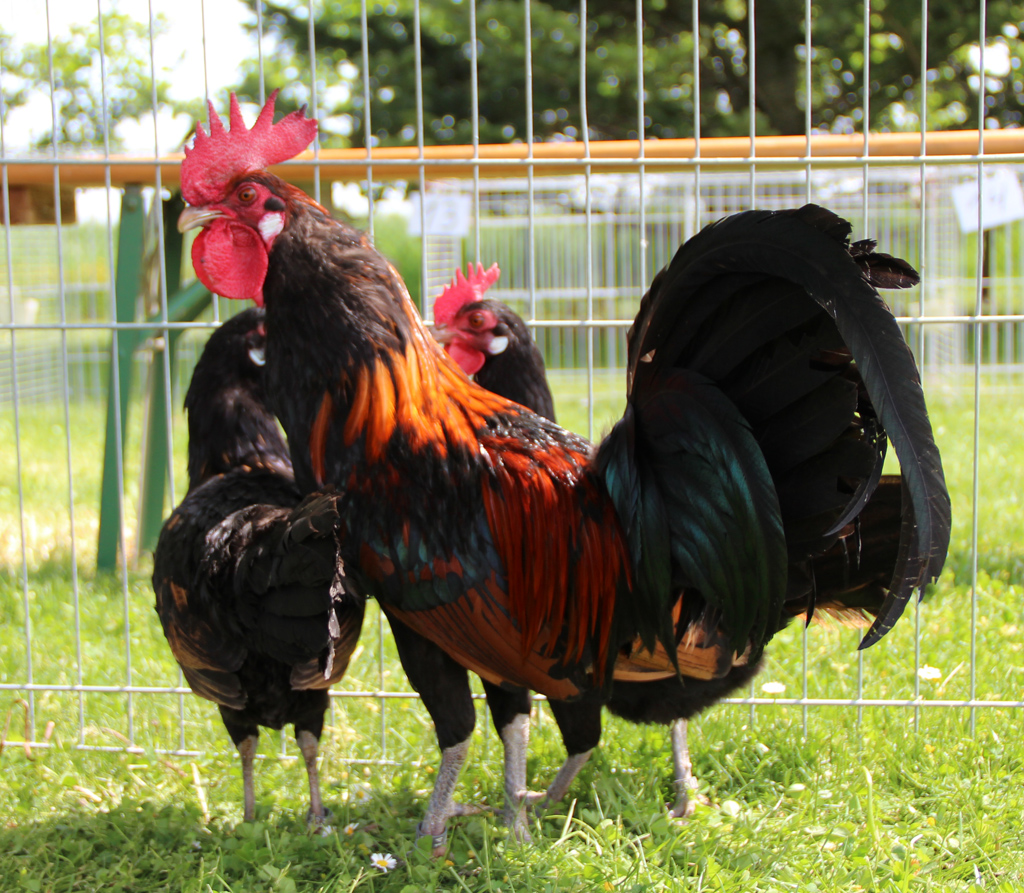
Bantam cock and hens

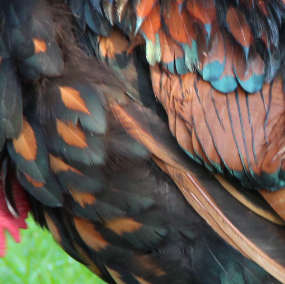
The typical broad lacing (Dobbelung) of the breast feathers

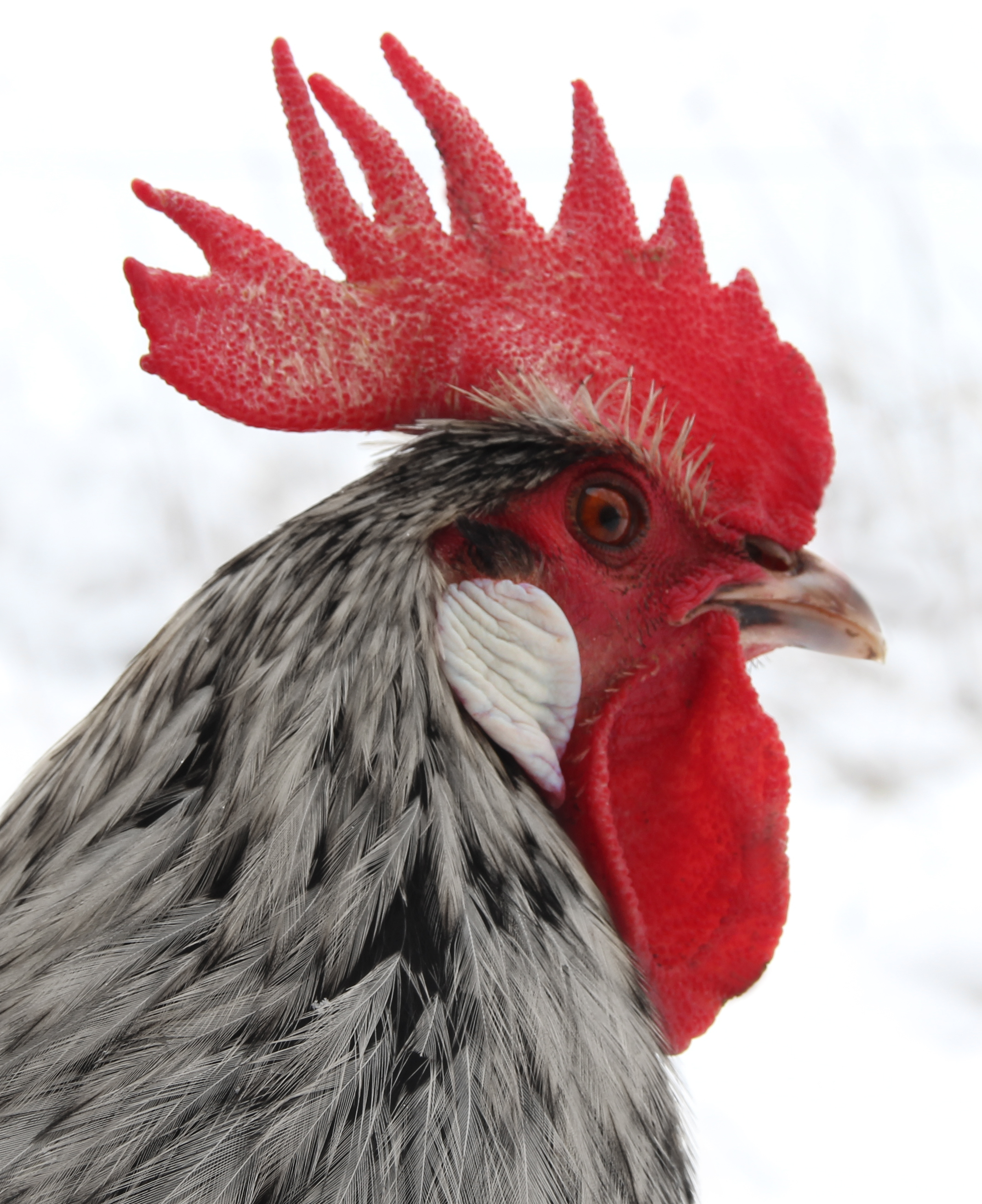
A sliver variety
