= Bruno Dürigen =

Eduard Bruno Dürigen (1 February 1853 – 12 February 1930) was a German science popularizer, teacher, animal keeper, herpetologist, and poultry breed specialist.

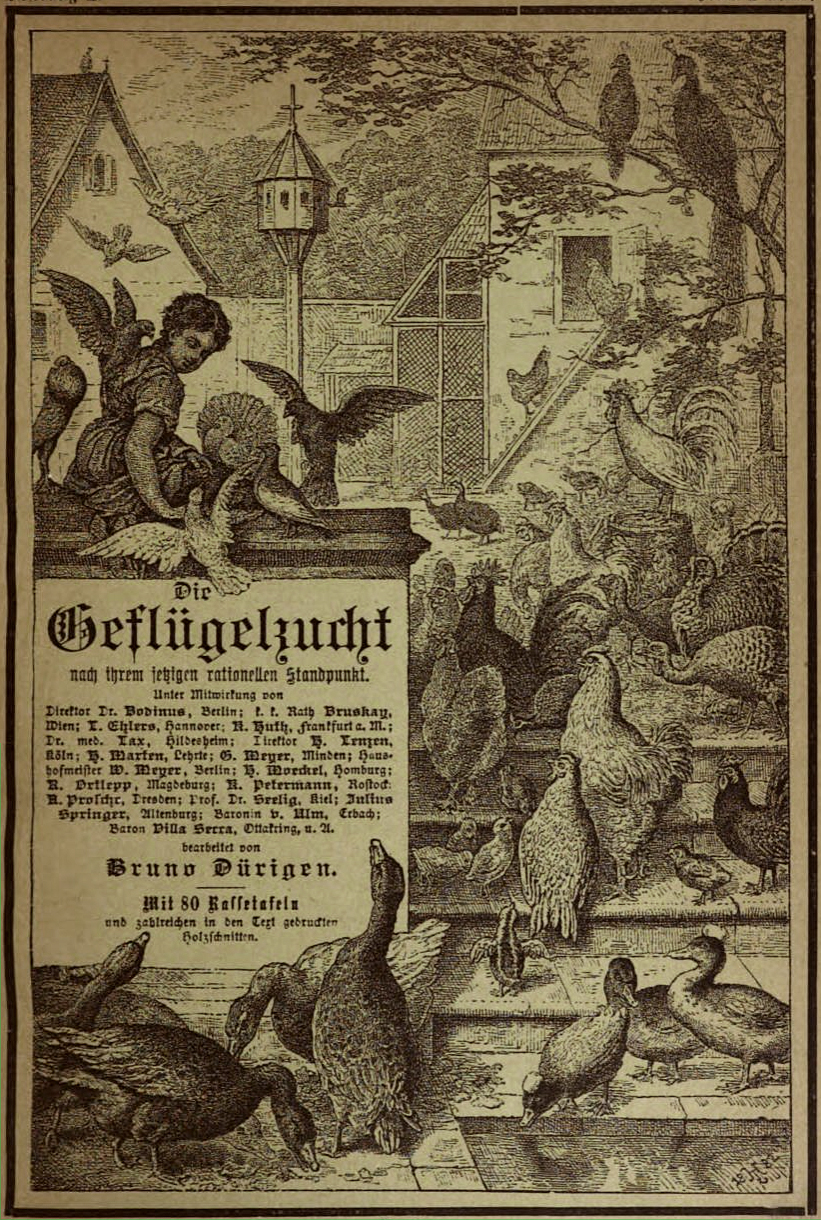
Title page of Die Geflügelzucht (1886)

Dürigen was born in Erdmannsdorf (now part of Augustusburg) near Chemnitz in Saxony to Wilhelm Eduard (born 1817), a master saddler and pigeon fancier from Oberlichtenau who had purchased a home in 848 and married Clara Auguste Thieme in 1849. While just eleven, the young Dürigen kept pigeons and took an interest in other birds as well. He trained in Zschopau as a teacher and was appointed in the Erzgebirge area and then to Dresden where he met Anton Reichenow. In 1874 he taught at a grammar school in Berlin-Steglitz and at the same time attended classes in botany and zoology at Berlin University. Along with Karl Ruß, he founded Isis a magazine for science in 1876. He quit editing in 1884 for unknown reasons and in 1890 he became an editor for an aquarium and terrarium magazine. He published a book on the amphibians and reptiles of Germany in 1897. In 1881 he was associated with the founding of the German Poultry Breeder Association in Elbersfeld and in 1886 he wrote a book on poultry breeding (Die Geflügelzucht). He was widely known as a specialist in the breeding of poultry. He was appointed a lecturer of poultry science in the agricultural academy in Berlin in 1906–07 and in 1925 made an honorary professor. He established a journal on poultry science Archiv fuer Gefluegelkunde (Archive of Poultry Science) and founded a museum of poultry breeds which is now in the Natural History Museum.

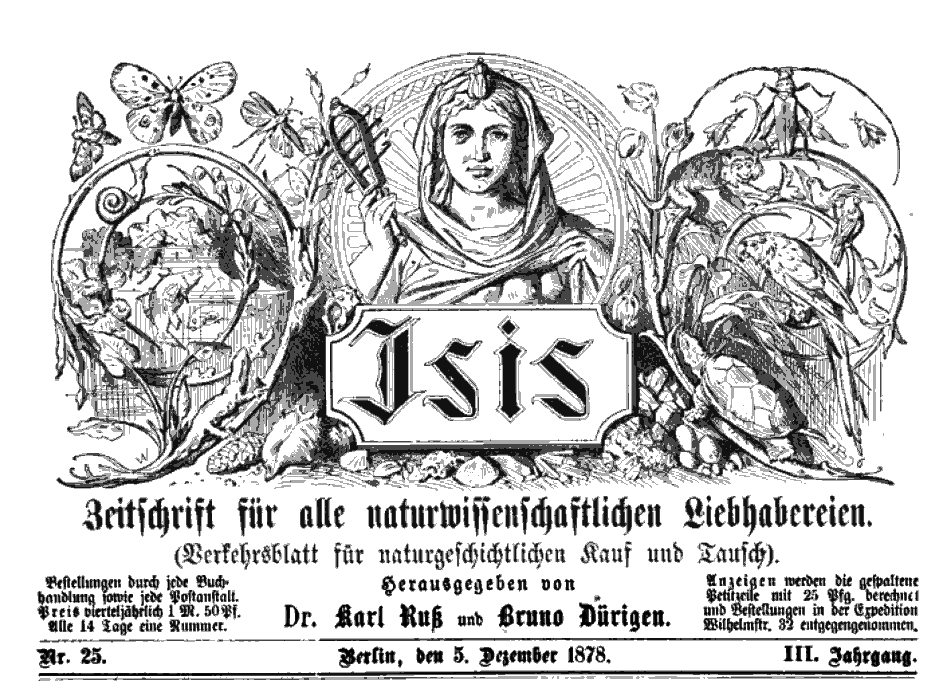
Title page of Isis (1878)
