= Yurlov Crower =

Breed of chicken

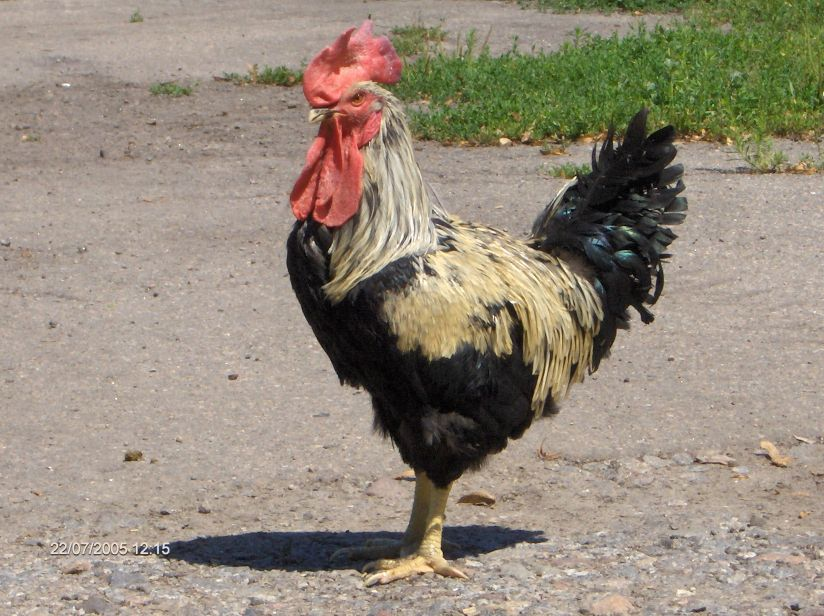
Yurlov Crower (male, a golden variety)

The Yurlov Crower is an old Russian breed of chicken primarily selected and used for long crowing cock contests in Russia.

== Breed names ==
- Russian: юрловская голосистая
- English: Yurlovo Crower, Yurlov Vociferous
- German: Jurlower Kräher
- Dutch: Joerlov-kraaier
- Italian: Canterino di Yurlov

== Breed history ==
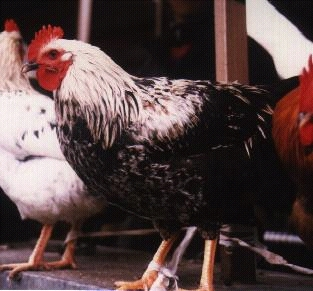
A Yurlov Crower male, of a silver variety. Moscow Bird's Market, Russia

The Yurlov Crower breed was presumably created in the second half of 19th century by crossing Chinese meat-type breeds, fighting cocks and landraces, but doubtfully with the direct influence of the Malay breed. According to Moiseyeva (1992), the known breed's plumage color variants are white, silver, scarlet, black with light yellow, or golden, hackle (most of all), and black.

The breed was a subject of interest among fancy, commercial and state breeders in Russia and Ukraine for a long time in the 20th century. It has been preserved and studied at few state poultry collection farms since the 1970s–1980s. The Geflügel-Börse magazine articles published by two German writers, Rüdiger Wandelt in 1993 and Wolfgang Vits in 1994, introduced the breed to poultry fanciers in Germany. However, the breed was not well known until recent time to a broad community of Western poultry breeders. The continued contacts between German and Russian poultry breeders in the 1990s and 2000s led to the import of the Yurlov Crower breed to Western Europe and growth of its popularity first in Germany and then in other European countries.

According to the USSR Central Statistic Administration, there were only 200 Yurlov chickens registered in the entire Soviet Union by 1985 (Moiseyeva, 1992). After the USSR disintegration, the breed population in independent Russian Federation, Ukraine and other republics dramatically declined. Based on the data collected in 1993, a Ukrainian strain of Yurlov Crowers (line 92) was included in the second edition of the FAO's World Watch List in 1995 (Scherf, 1995). The breed and line 92 data were also summarized in the third edition of the WWL in 2000 (Scherf, 2000), in which, as of 1993, only 205 Yurlov birds (line 92) kept in Kharkov Region of Ukraine were mentioned and the population status was endangered. The current population of the Yurlov Crower chickens in Russia and Ukraine may be several thousands including both state farms and fanciers. However, bird influenza may represent a serious threat to and decrease numbers of pure chicken breeds (including Yurlovs) in these countries to a large extent.

== Genetic analysis ==
The breed was included in the studies of genetic diversity and relationships between various chicken breeds:

- Moiseyeva et al. (1994)
- Nikiforov et al. (1998)
- Romanov and Weigend (2001)
- Semyenova et al. (2002)
- Moiseyeva et al. (2003)
- Hillel et al. (2003)

The latter study was done in 1998—2000 within the framework of an international research project entitled «Development of Strategy and Application of Molecular Tools to Assess Biodiversity in Chicken Genetic Resources», or shortly AVIANDIV, that was sponsored by European Commission and co-ordinated by Prof. Steffen Weigend, of the Institute for Animal Breeding, Mariensee, Germany.

The AVIANDIV project employed anonymous genetic markers, so called microsatellite loci spread across the whole genome. It was shown that 33 populations had no unique alleles, 14 populations had one unique allele, but the Yurlov Crower from Russia has 8 unique alleles. That the Ukrainian population of Yurlov Crowers did not have any unique alleles, that is, had remarkably different genetic features. Overall, the Russian Yurlov Crower population became one of three the most diverse, or polymorphic, populations in the study, along with a wild red junglefowl population and a broiler dam line.
