= Ayam Kampong =

Breed of chicken

Ayam Kampung
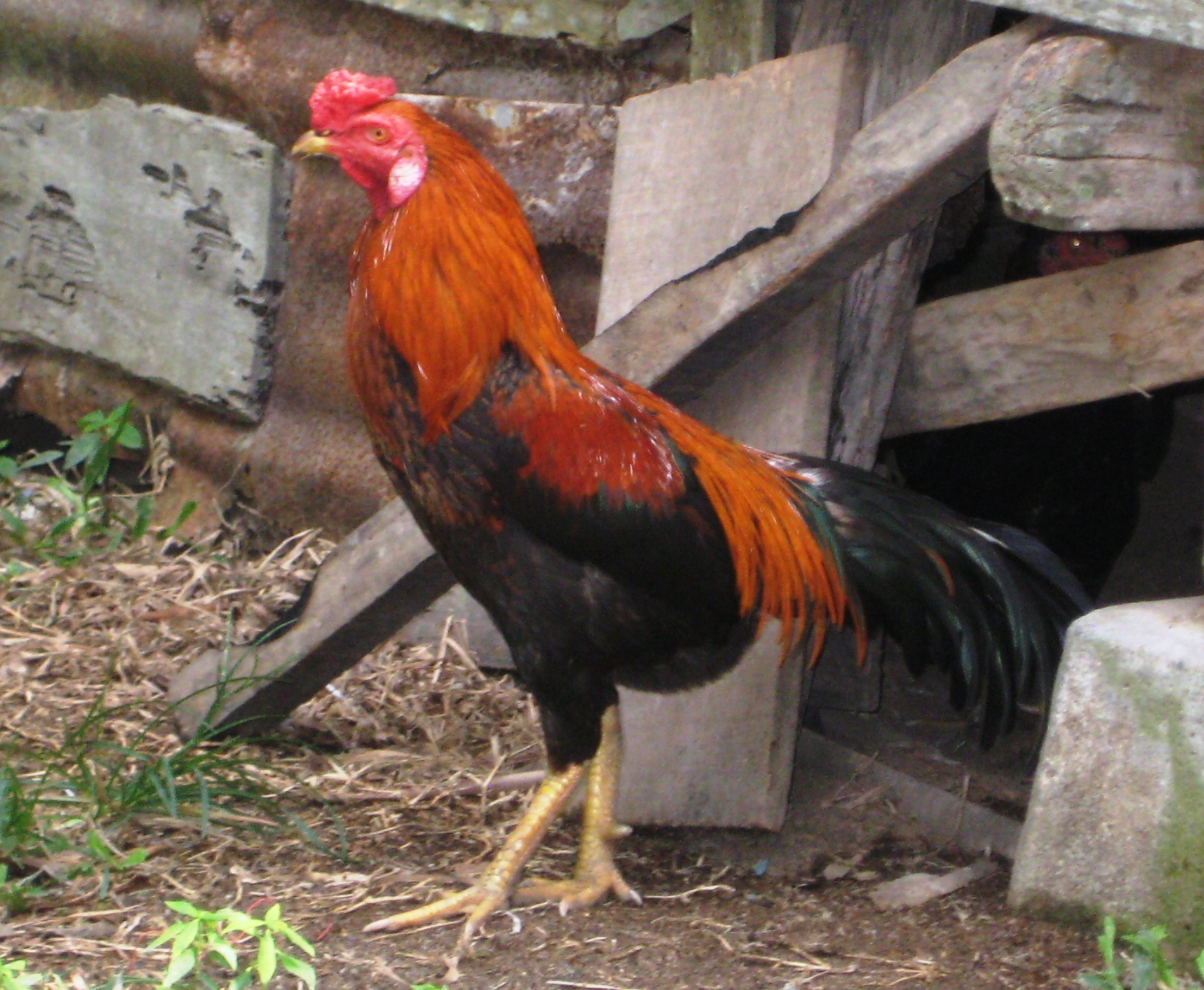
- Cock of the black-red type
- Conservation status: least concern
- Other names: Ayam Kampung
- Country of origin: Indonesia and Malaysia
- Use: dual-purpose

Traits
- Weight: Male: average 2 – 2.5 kg; Female: average 1.5 – 2 kg
- Egg color: white and light brown

Classification
- Chicken; Gallus gallus domesticus

The Ayam Kampong (older spelling) or Ayam Kampung is a chicken breed from Indonesia and Malaysia. The name means simply "free-range chicken" or literally "village chicken". In Indonesia and Malaysia, the term ayam kampung refer to indigenous chickens that are raised using traditional free range production techniques by almost every household in the village. It is a diverse population which resulted from the uncontrolled cross-breeding of red jungle-fowl, indigenous Southeast Asian chickens and exotic chickens of various types imported in the late 1800s by European, mainly Dutch and British, settlers.

== Characteristics ==
The Ayam Kampong is a small dual-purpose chicken. They are slow-growing breed that contributed to its low productivity. Both its physical characteristics and its colouring are highly variable. Three principal colour types are recognised. The commonest is the black-red variety, in which cocks are mainly green-black with glossy red-brown back, neck hackles and saddle feathers. Other varieties are the red type and the naked-neck type.

== Use ==
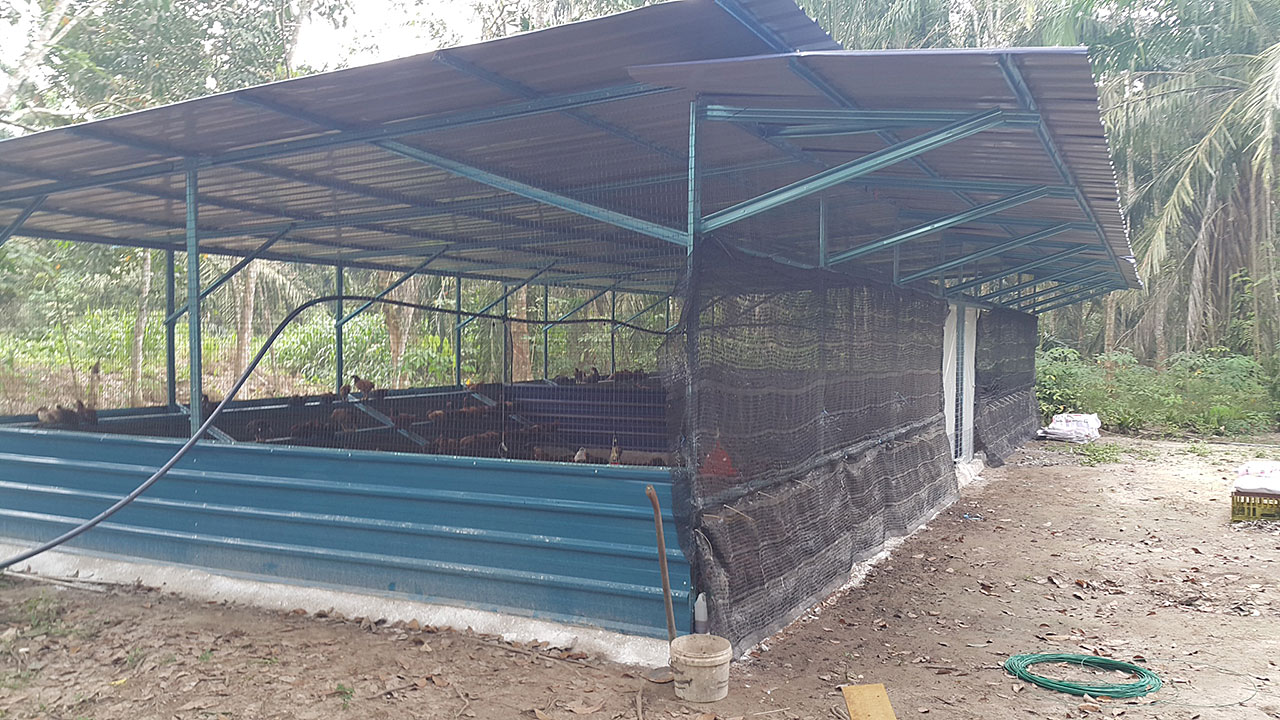
An Ayam Kampong rearing shed in Johor, Malaysia.

Traditionally Ayam Kampong have been raised by most of the rural population of Indonesia and they represent an important source of meat and eggs. However, due to their low production, Ayam Kampong are not able to provide consumption on a daily basis. Nevertheless, they are traditionally consumed on most family occasions and celebrations.

Ayam Kampong hens left to forage lay about 55 or 100 brown eggs per year, with an average weight of 39 g. The poor performance as an egg producer is attributed to the broodiness of the hens.

In meat production, birds reach a market weight of 1–1.5 kg in three or four months. The meat commands a higher price than that of commercial breeds.

== Gallery ==
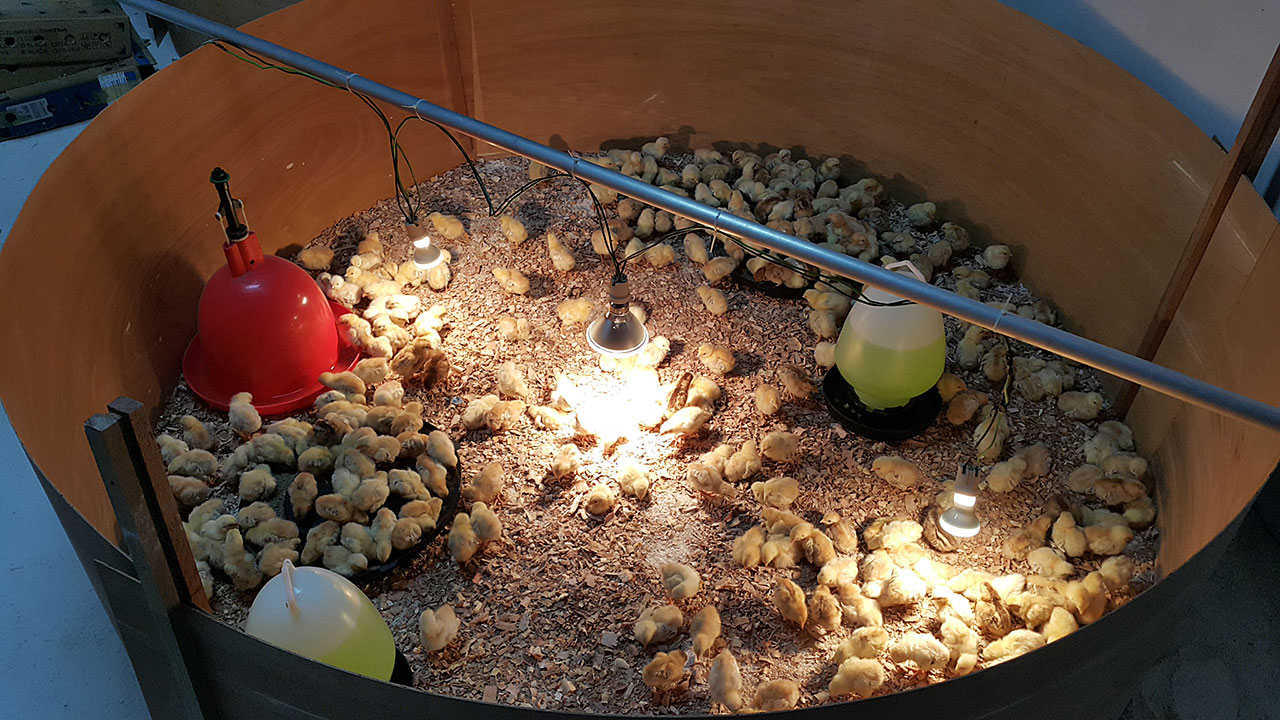
Day-old Ayam Kampung chicks

Ayam Kampung rooster and hen

== See also ==
- List of chicken breeds
