= Ohiki =

Japanesereed of chicken

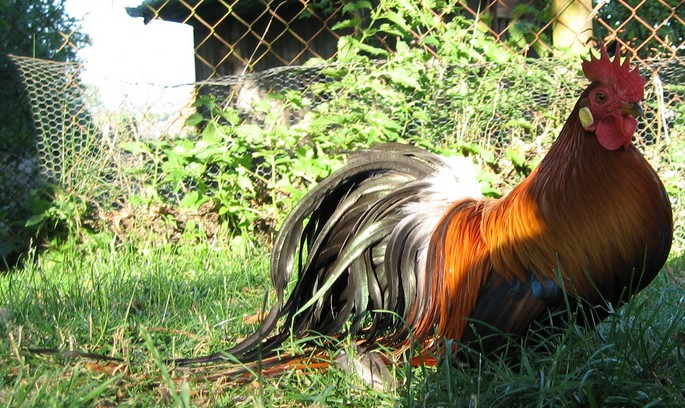
- A black breasted-red cock
- Other names: Japanese: 尾曳
- Country of origin: Japan

Classification
- APA: no
- EE: yes
- PCGB: rare true bantam

The Ohiki (Japanese: 尾曳, Obiki) is a Japanese breed of small chicken, characterised by unusually long tail-feathers in cock birds; the breed name means approximately 'tail dragging'. It is a true bantam, a small-sized bird with no large–fowl counterpart. It originates in Kōchi Prefecture, on the island of Shikoku in southern Japan, and is thought to derive from cross-breeding in the Edo Period (1603–1867) between long-tailed breeds such as the Onagadori and bantams such as the Chabo.

The Ohiki was recognised as a Natural Monument of Japan in 1923.

== History ==
Breeding in the United Kingdom began in the 1990s.

== Characteristics ==
Three colour varieties are recognised in Japan: black-breasted red, black-breasted silver and white. The Entente Européenne recognises the first two of these, and lists four unrecognised colours. The Poultry Club of Great Britain recognises four colours: black-red, gold duckwing, silver duckwing and white.
