= Tomaru =

Japanese breed of chicken

Tōmaru
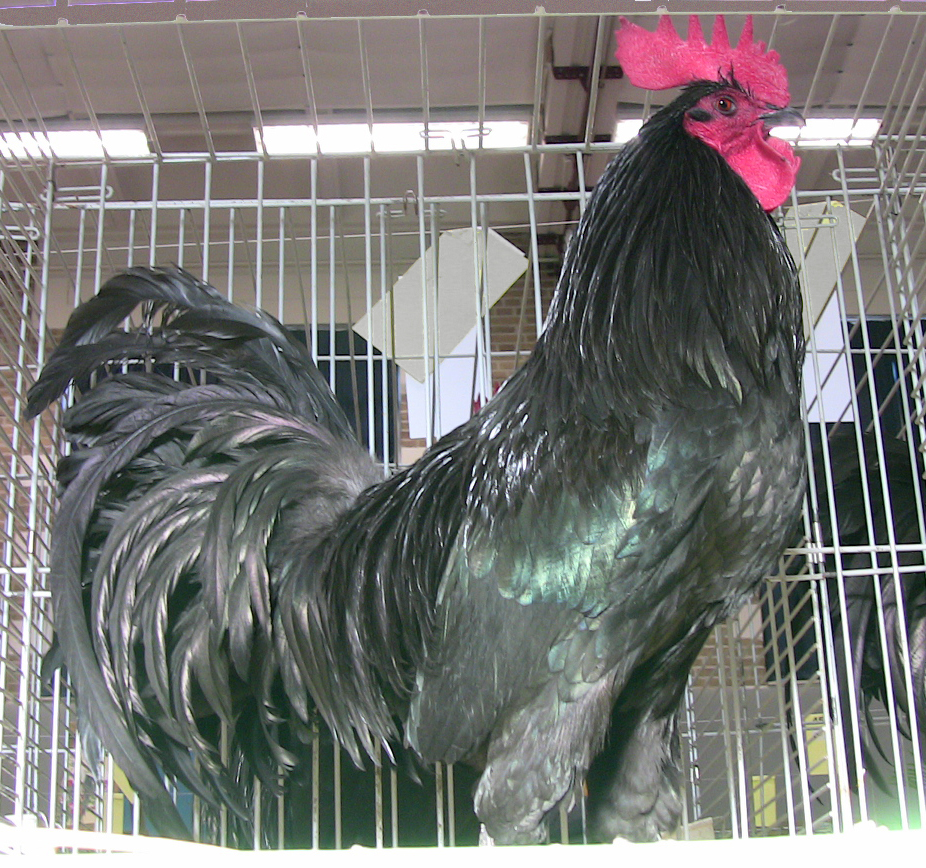
- Conservation status: FAO (2007): not at risk; DAD-IS (2022): unknown
- Country of origin: Japan

Traits
- Weight: Male: 3.3 kg; Female: 2.1 kg
- Colour: black

Classification
- APA: no
- EE: yes
- PCGB: yes
- Chicken; Gallus gallus domesticus

The Tōmaru (唐丸) is a Japanese breed of long-crowing chicken. The crow may be sustained for some 25 seconds. It is one of four Japanese long-crowing breeds, the others being the Koeyoshi, the Kurokashiwa and the Tōtenkō.

== History ==
The Tōmaru is thought to have originated in China at the time of the Tang dynasty; the kanji character 唐, 'tou', represents that dynasty.

The Tomaru was registered as a Japanese natural monument of Niigata Prefecture in 1939.

== Characteristics ==
The Tōmaru has only one colour, black with a greenish sheen. The body is broad and compact with a full breast. The tail is held low, but higher than horizontally; although the sickle feathers may be long enough to touch the ground, this is not usually considered a long-tailed breed. The feet and shanks are dark slate-grey. The comb is single. The ears and face are red, sometimes with dark markings; in hens the face may be entirely black.
