= List of German cattle breeds =

This is a list of the cattle breeds usually considered to be of German origin. Some may have complex or obscure histories, so inclusion here does not necessarily imply that a breed is predominantly or exclusively from Germany.

Name in German	English name if used	Notes	Image
Angler	Angeln		
Angler Rind alter Zuchtrichtung		extremely endangered	
Ansbach-Triesdorfer		extremely endangered	
Berchtesgadener Katze		extinct	
Braunvieh			
Braunvieh alter Zuchtrichtung	Original Braunvieh	gravely endangered	
Deutsch Angus	German Angus		
Deutsche Holstein Rotbunt		see Holstein Friesian	
Deutsche Holstein Schwarzbunt		see Holstein Friesian	
Deutsche Rotbunte			
Deutsches Schwarzbuntes Niederungsrind	German Black Pied	endangered	
Deutsches Shorthorn		gravely endangered	
Doppelnutzung Rotbunt		conservation status: alert	
Fleckvieh			
Fleckvieh Fleischnutzung			
Gelbvieh		endangered	
Gelbvieh Fleischnutzung			
Glanrind	Glan	gravely endangered	
Grauvieh			
Harzer Rotvieh		also Harzer Rote Höhenvieh	
Hinterwälder	Hinterwald	gravely endangered	
Hinterwälder Fleischnutzung			
Lakenvelder Rind	Lakenvelder		
Limpurger		extremely endangered	
Murnau-Werdenfelser	Murnau-Werdenfels	extremely endangered	
Murnau-Werdenfelser Fleischnutzung			
Pinzgauer		gravely endangered	
Pinzgauer Fleischnutzung			
Rotes Höhenvieh		endangered	
Rotvieh alter Angler Zuchtrichtung			
Schwarzbuntes Milchrind	German Black Pied Dairy		
Uckermärker			
Vogesen-Rind			
Vorderwälder	Vorderwald	conservation status: alert	
Vorderwälder Fleischnutzung			
