= Belarus Red =

Breed of cattle

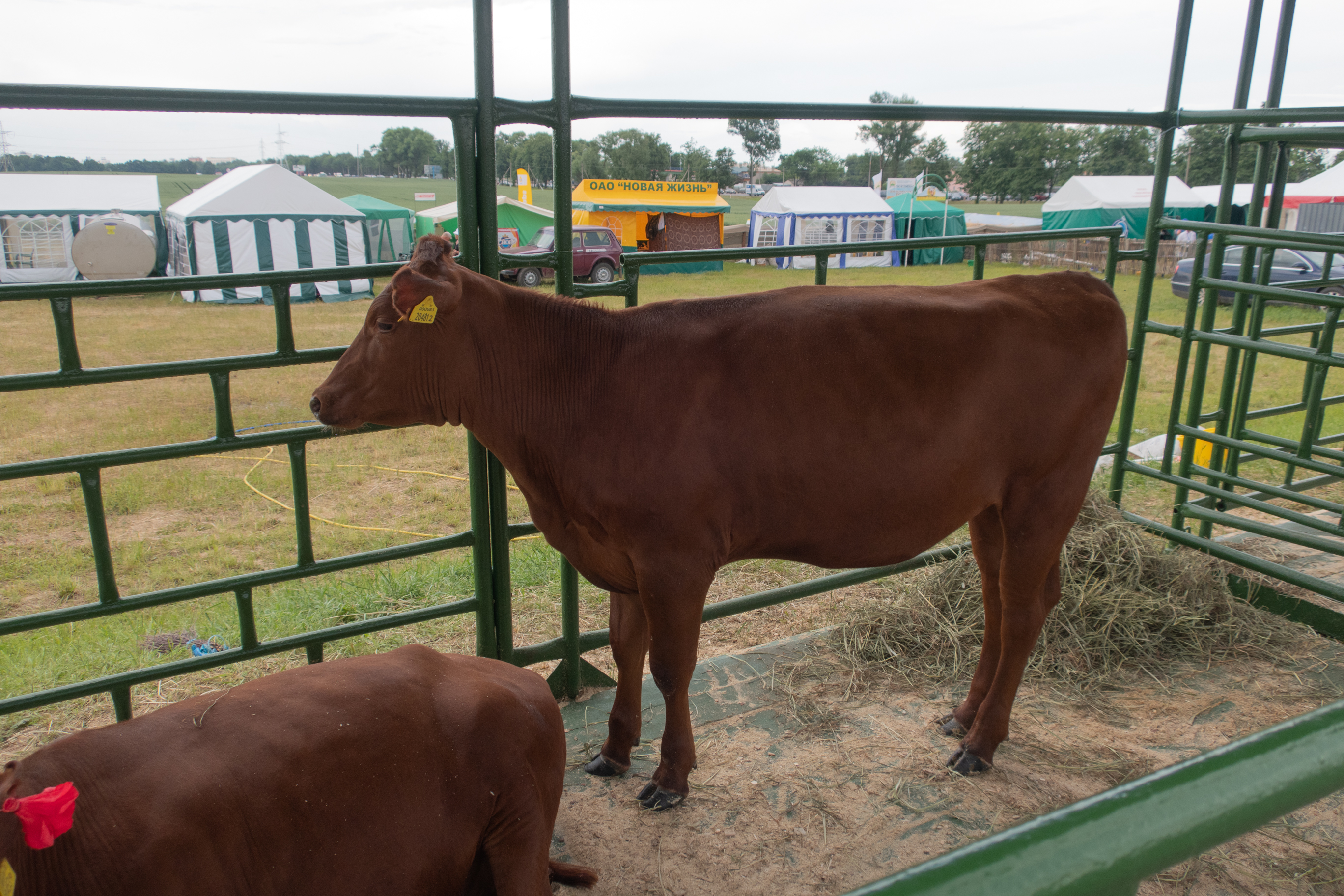
10-month old cow

Belarus Red (Belarusian: Беларуская чырвоная, Russian: Белорусская красная), also known as Byelorussian Red, Krasnaya belorusskaya, and Krasnobelorusskaya, is a Belarusan dairy cattle breed.

The breed has been improved by crossing with Angeln Red, German Red, Polish Red, Danish Red, Estonian Red, and Latvian Brown. They are common in Belarus, mostly around Grodno and Minsk. They are noted for their longevity and undemanding feeding requirements.
