= Red cow =

Red Cow may refer to:

- Red heifer, the sacred cow in Judaism
- Red Cow interchange, an infamous junction located in Dublin, also known as the Mad Cow Roundabout
- Name of many cattle breeds, such as Danish Red, Polish Red
- Akabeko, a legendary cow from the Aizu region of Japan
- Red cow (slang), also known as redbull, a political term used in Vietnam to describe extreme patriots
- Red Cow (film), a 2018 Israeli independent drama film
- The Red or Laughing Cow, the symbol of The Laughing Cow dairy products

== See also ==
- Red Bull (disambiguation)
