= Red Bull (disambiguation) =

Red Bull is a brand of energy drinks.

Red Bull (also redbull) may also refer to:

- Red Bull (fictional creature) from the 1968 fantasy novel and 1982 film The Last Unicorn by Peter S. Beagle
- Red bull ant, a species of ant found in Australia
- Red Bull Culture Clash, a sound clash competition
- Red Bull GmbH, the private company owner of the brand
- Red bull (slang), a political term in Vietnam describing people who follow extreme patriotism
- Red Bull Highway (Minnesota), a section of Interstate 35 in Minnesota, US
- Red Bull Highway (Iowa), a section of U.S. Route 34 in Iowa, US
- Red Bulls, nickname for the 34th Infantry Division of the US Army
- Red Bull Theatre, a seventeenth century playhouse in London
- Red Bull, a cultivar of Brussels sprout
- Schlitz Red Bull, a malt liquor
- Akabeko, a legendary cow from the Aizu region of Japan

== Sport ==
- Red Bull Racing, a Formula One team
- Red Bull Ring, a racing circuit in Austria
- RB Leipzig, German football club nicknamed the Red Bulls
- Red Bulls (esports), a League of Legends videogame professional gaming team
- New York Red Bulls, an American soccer club
- FC Red Bull Salzburg, an Austrian football club
- Red Bull Bragantino, a Brazilian football club

== See also ==
- Red Bullock (1911–1988), American baseball player
- Red Bullet (born 1997), American racehorse
- Krating Daeng, the original Thai drink that became Red Bull
- Red Bull Racing (disambiguation)
- Red Bull Salzburg (disambiguation)
- Red cow
