= Belted cow =

A belted cow (nicknamed beltie or Oreo cow) may refer to:

- Belted Galloway from Scotland
- Dutch Belted (Lakenvelder)
