= Glan cattle =

Breed of cattle

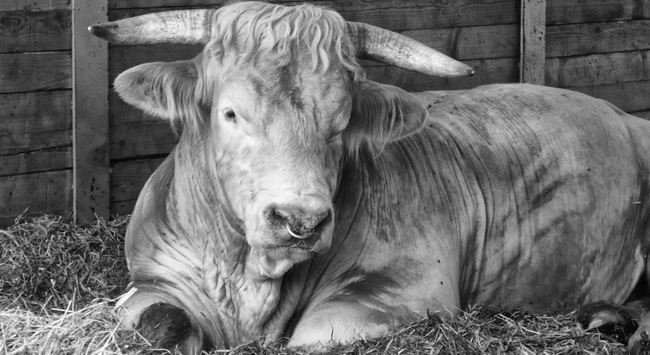
Glan bull

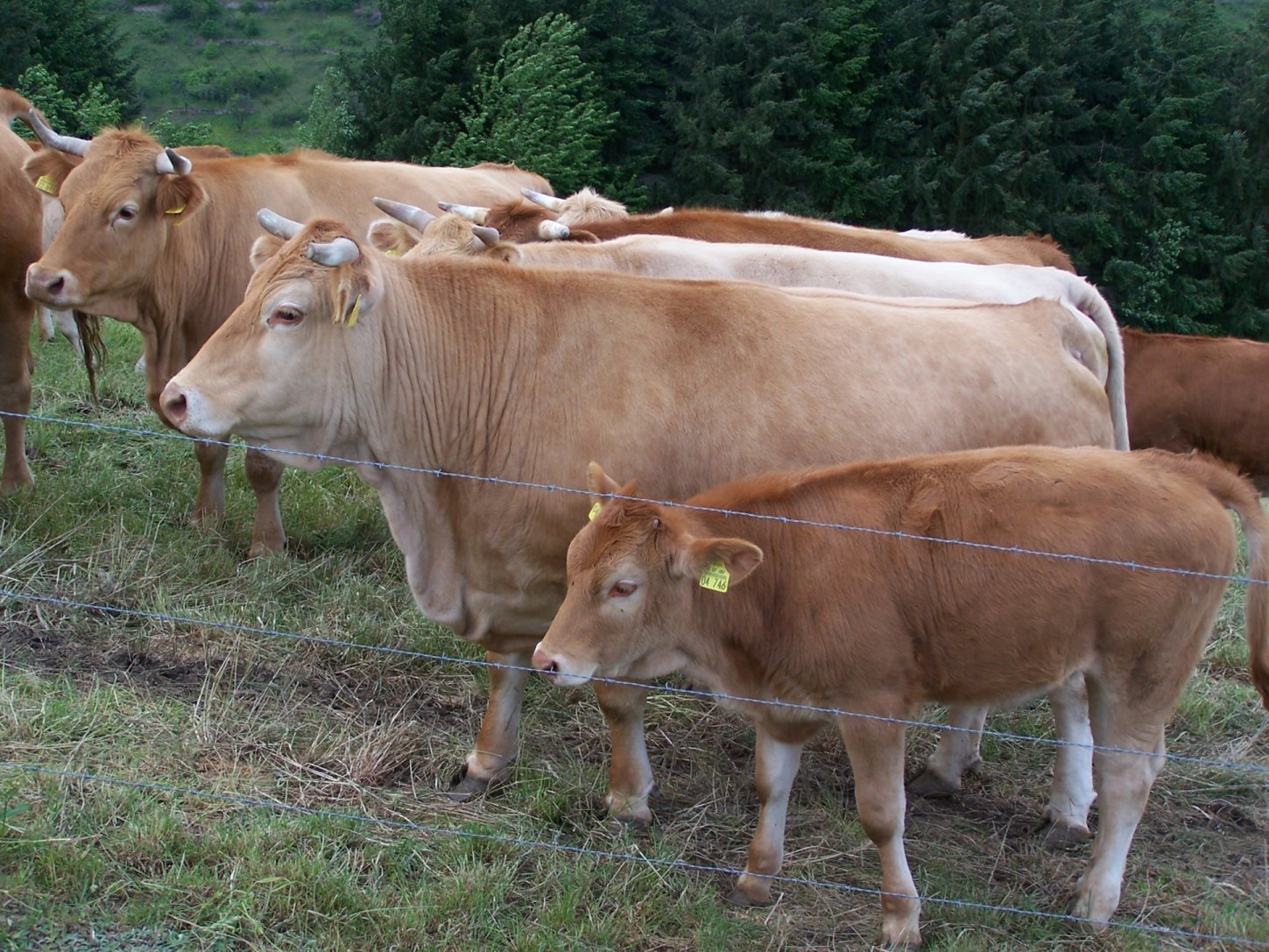
Cows and calves

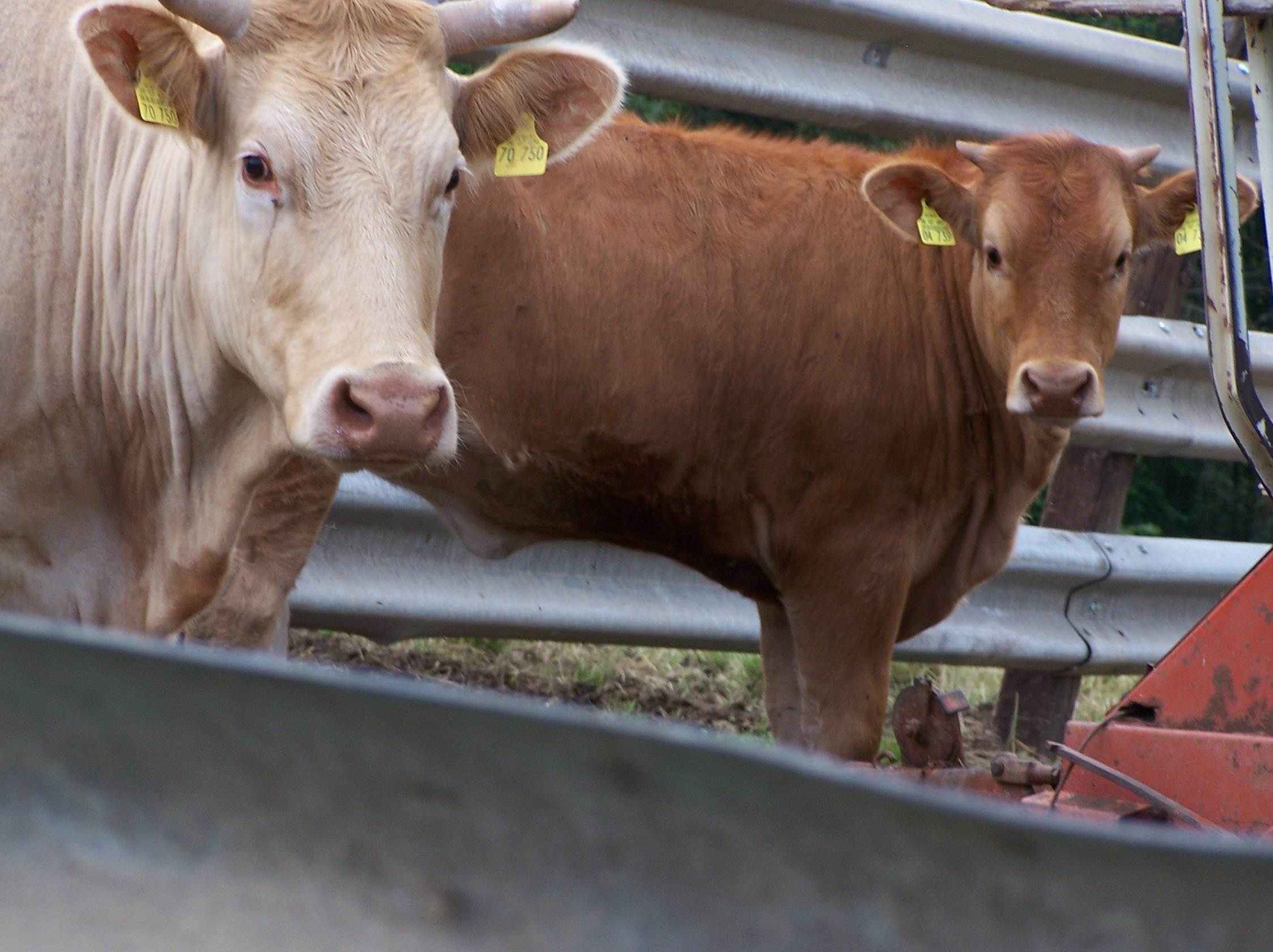
Different fur colours

Glan cattle are a traditional cattle breed particularly found in the Rhineland-Palatinate region of Germany. At one time they were almost extinct, but today there are about 2,000 animals. Originally multipurpose, they are nowadays mainly used for beef production.

== Characteristics ==
- Height: bulls 140–145 cm; cows 135–140 cm
- Weight: bulls 1,000–1,200 kg; cows 600–750 kg

An important breeding aim is the unicoloured yellowish fur.

== History ==
The modern type of Glan multipurpose cattle was established by Duke Christian IV, Count Palatine of Zweibrücken, through an inspection decree of 12 September 1773 that demanded the improvement of the local small red breed through using Simmental and Berne Mountain bulls. By 1762 the import of Swiss cattle had already begun; this was the beginning of Glan cattle breeding.

In Donnersberg and Glan, two different cattle breeds developed: the light, dairy "Glan cattle" and the heavy draught "Donnersberg cattle". In the 19th century the two breeds mixed and became the "Glan-Donnersberg cattle" that were exported to the Hunsrück, the Westerwald and the Eifel.

The first breed associations were founded in 1880 in Meisenheim and Quirnbach, later followed in 1898 by the Glan-Donnersberg Breeding Association based in Kaiserslautern and in 1912 the revived Association of the Rhenish Glan Cattle Breeding Cooperatives (later Association of the Rhenish Glan Cattle Breeders).

In the 1920s they began crossing with Gelbvieh. One decade later they changed the breeding aim: the draught performance, once one of the advantages, became less important. Since 1950 they crossed in Danish Red cattle that caused either the loss of milk performance or of beef performance. This was the beginning of the end of purebred Glan cattle. The crossing in of Gelbvieh, Danish Red cattle and Angeln cattle was continued. In 1967 the pure breed was abandoned, and in 1972 the Association of the Rhenish Glan Cattle Breeders closed.

In 1984 or 1985 an Association for the Conservation and Promotion of the Glan Cattle was founded. In search of old type Glan cattle they discovered 25 cows, among them only 4 purebreds. No living purebred bulls were found, but they found frozen sperm of purebred bulls. For the conservation of the breed they also used bulls of related breeds like Gelbvieh.

Many associations breed Glan cattle today, with the main focus on the beef performance. Noteworthy populations are in Rhineland-Palatinate, Saarland and North Rhine-Westphalia.
