= Harzer Rotvieh =

Breed of cattle

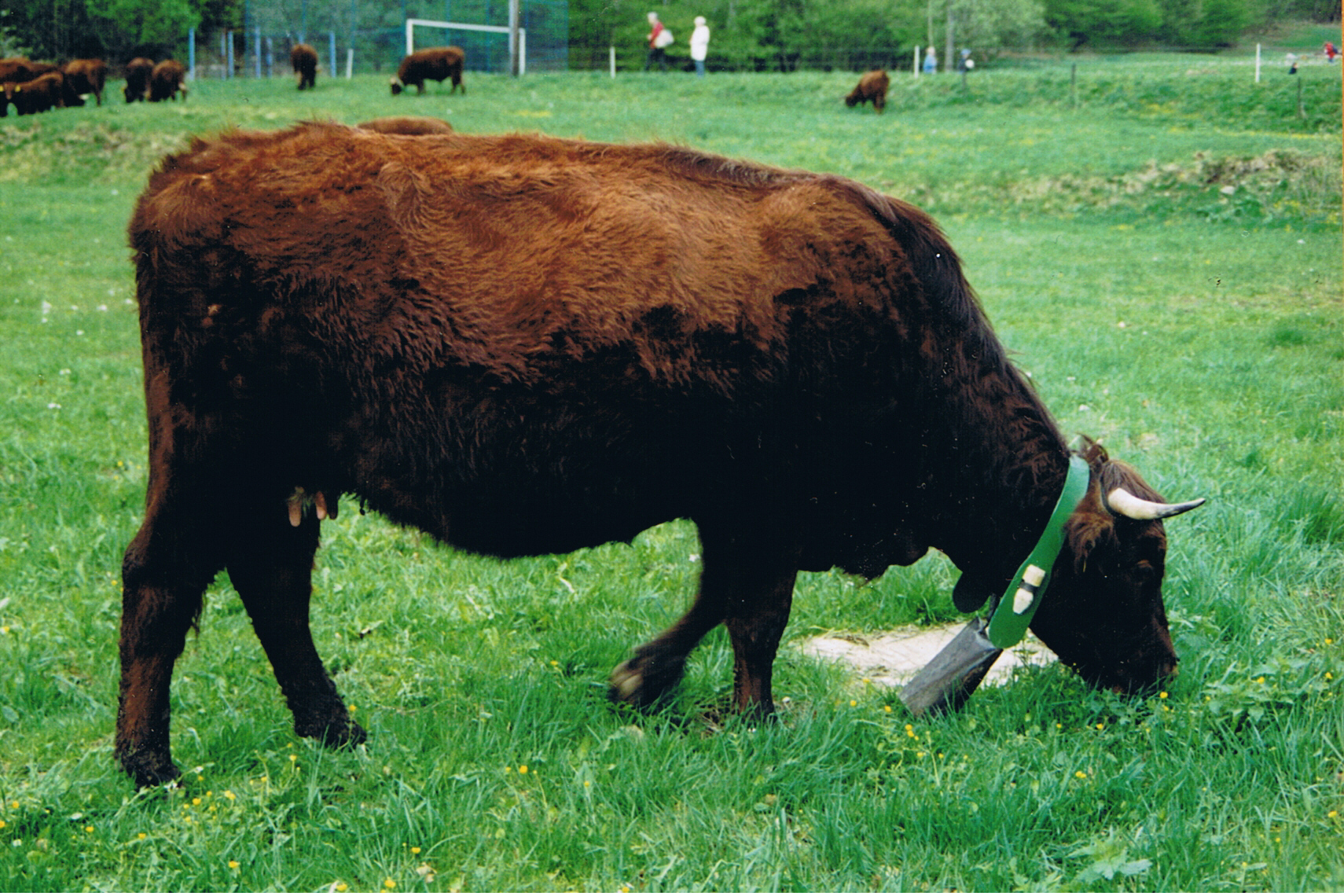
Harzer Rotvieh

The Harzer Rotvieh is a unicoloured red cattle breed from the Harz in Germany. They serve the purposes of providing milk, beef and draught power. The name means "red cattle of the Harz".

== History ==
This cattle breed stemmed from the red cattle breeds of South and Middle Germany and traced probably back to unicoloured red Germanic-Celtic Cattle. Out of them a local cattle breed developed under the tough conditions of the Harz mountain range.

In the 1950s this cattle breed was crossed with Danish Red bulls to increase milk yields. Later they crossed in Angeln cattle. Since 1980 the Harzer Rotvieh has been only a variety of the Angeln breed.

In the middle of the 1980s they took remaining animals of the old Harzer Rotvieh (that were already mixed) to synthesize a new population of "Red Cattle, breeding type upland cattle", the Rotes Höhenvieh.

== Breed farms ==
The Harzer Rotvieh is bred on only a few farms:

- Mountainfarmer Wolfgang Beuse on the Farm of „Klein-Tirol“, 20 cows, 1 bull
- Thielecke, a farmer at the foot of Brocken in Tanne
- Claus and Katharina Kohlrusch, 21 cows, 5 bulls

== Sources ==
- Association Harz Cows: Harz heardsmen, Harz Cows in history, present and future, Clausthal-Zellerfeld, 1998 ISBN 3-89720-139-9
