= Ox =

Common bovine draft and riding animal

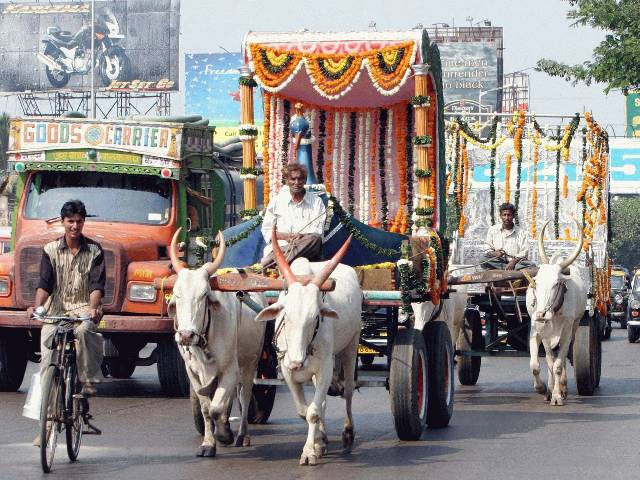
Zebu oxen in Mumbai, India

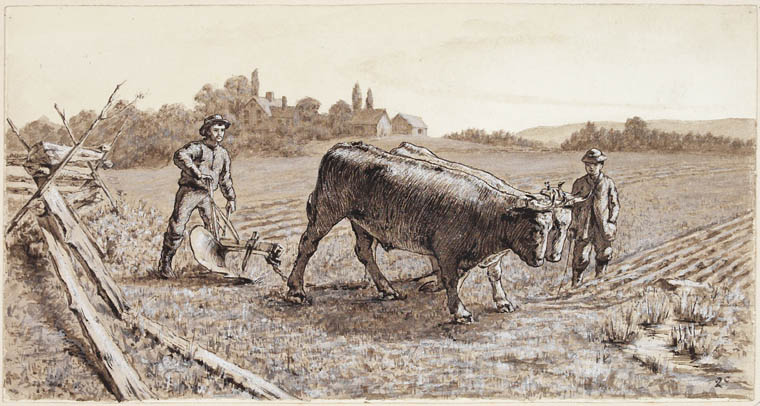
Ploughing with Oxen by George H. Harvey, Nova Scotia, Canada, 1881

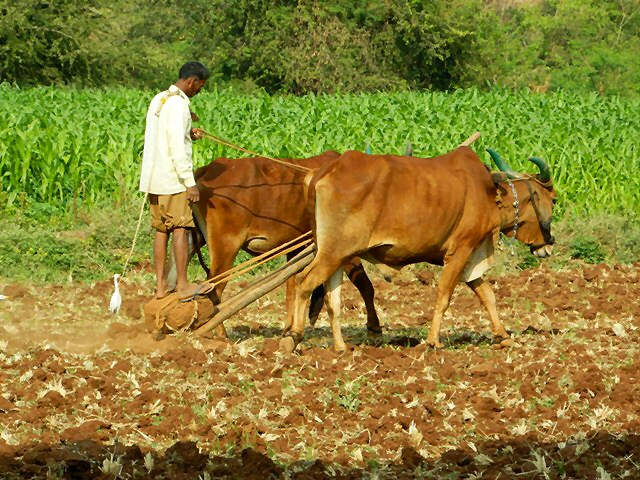
Oxen used for plowing, 2013

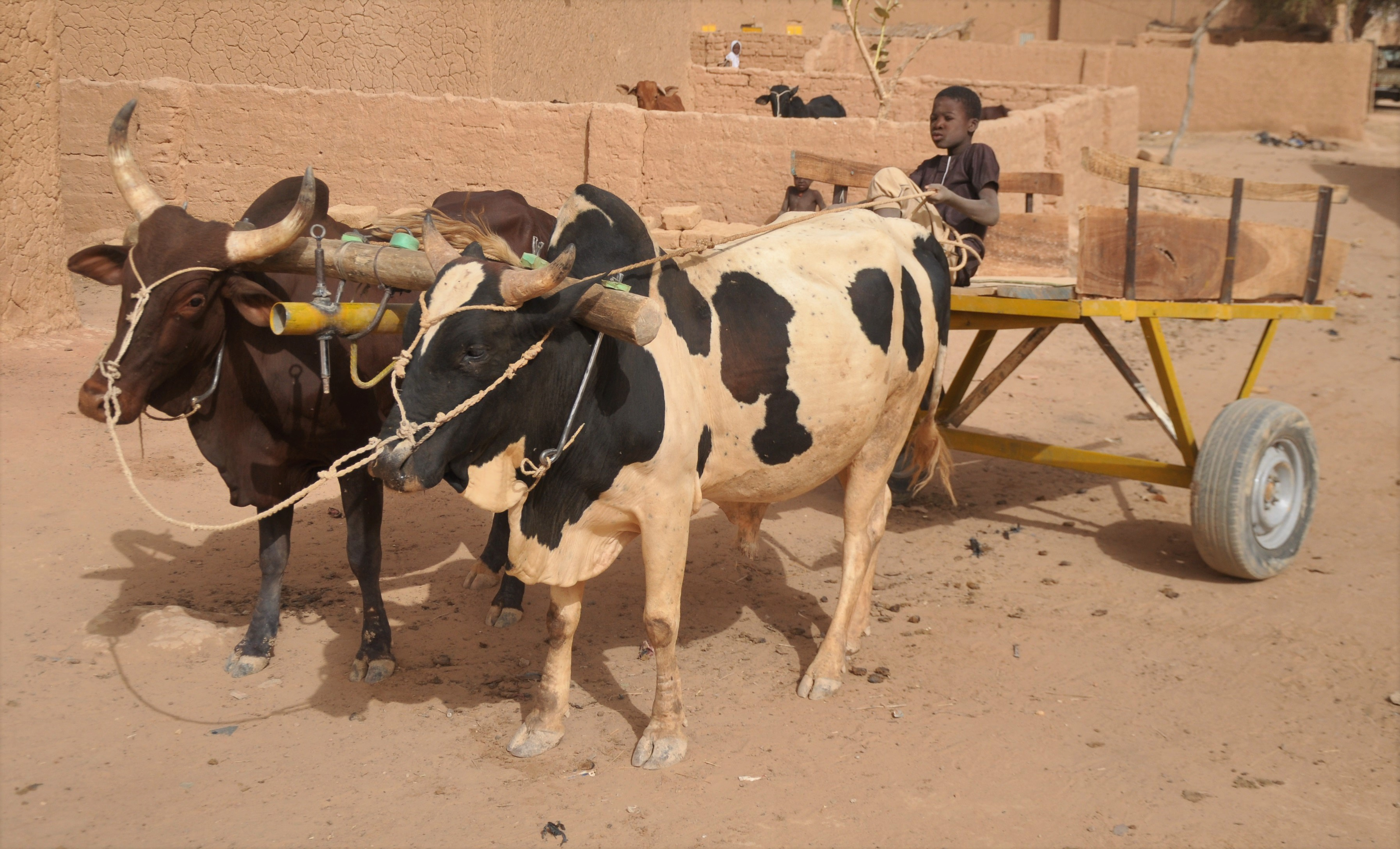
Boy on an ox-drawn cart in Niger

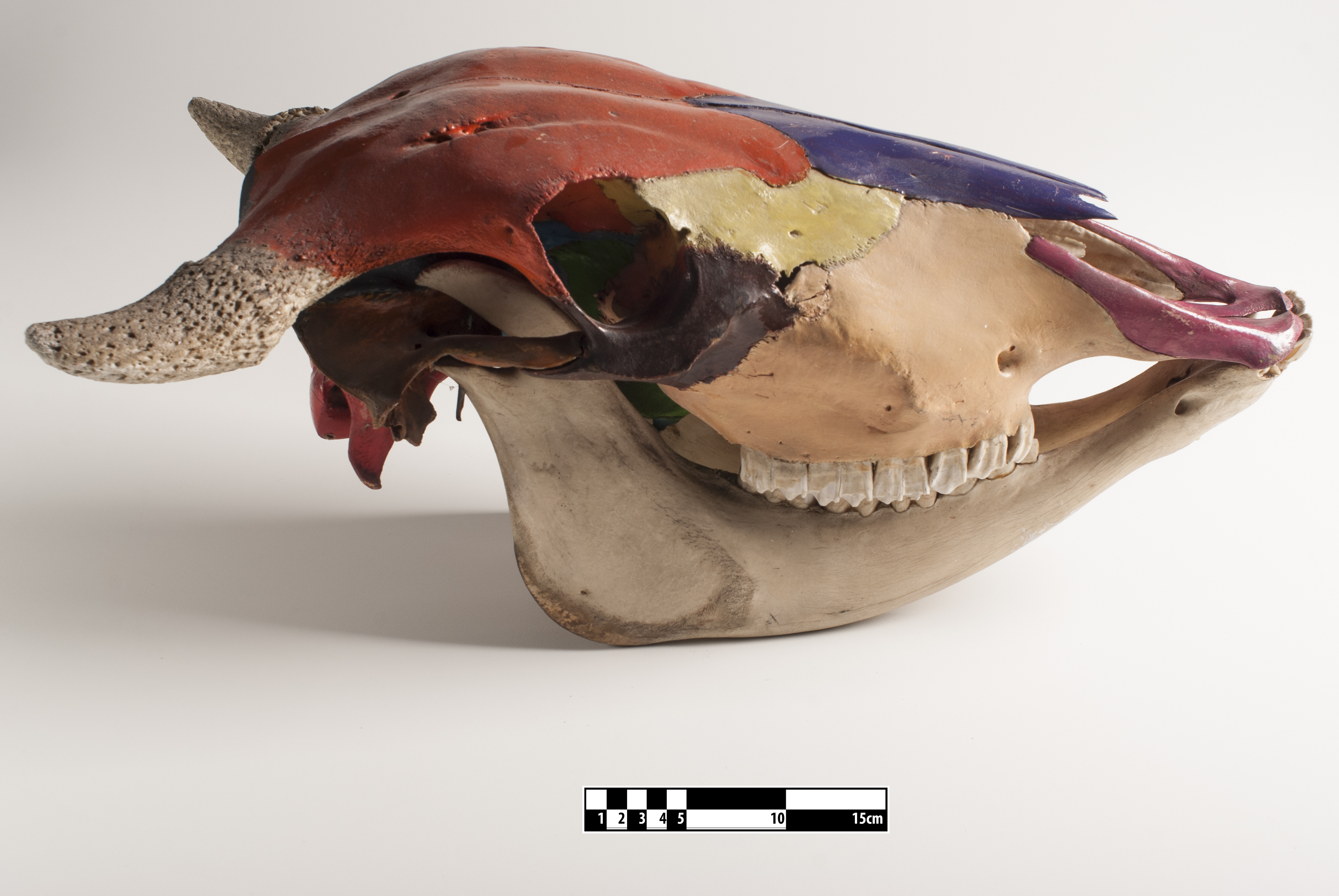
Ox skull

An ox (pl.: oxen), also known as a steer or bullock (in British, Australian, and Indian English), is a large bovine, trained and used as a draft animal. Oxen are commonly castrated adult male cattle, because castration inhibits testosterone and aggression, which makes the males docile and safer to work with. Cows (intact females) or bulls (intact males) may also be used in some areas.

Oxen are used for ploughing, for transport (pulling carts, hauling wagons, and even riding), for threshing grain by trampling, and for powering machines that grind grain or supply irrigation among other purposes. Oxen may be also used to skid logs in forests, particularly in low-impact, select-cut logging.

Oxen are usually yoked in pairs. Light work such as carting household items on good roads might require just one pair, while for heavier work, further pairs would be added as necessary. A team used for a heavy load over difficult ground might exceed nine or ten pairs.

Oxen are thought to have first been harnessed and put to work around 4000 BC.

== Etymology ==
The word ox derives from the reconstructed Proto-Indo-European root *uks-en-, translated as 'male animal'. The term has been reconstructed using cognates from several separate branches of Indo-European languages: Welsh ych meaning 'ox', Middle Irish oss 'stag', Avestan uxshan- 'ox' or 'bull', and Sanskrit uksa, inferred to relate to cattle. Welsh and Middle Irish are Celtic languages, while Avestan and Sanskrit are Indo-Iranian languages. The wide usage of the root throughout Eurasia serves as evidence for the existence of shared Proto-Indo-European ancestry.

The prefix *uks-en- is possibly from the reconstructed root *uks- which has been translated as 'to sprinkle'. It could also relate to ugw-, relating to 'wet' or 'moist'. Therefore, *uks-en- could be translated to 'besprinkler'. Another interpretation could take the en- root, meaning 'onto', into account, translating the term as 'to sprinkle onto'.

The reconstructed Proto-Germanic word *ukhson, meaning 'ox', derives from the Proto-Indo-European root *uks-en-. The word led to terms meaning 'ox' used in East, West, and North Germanic languages: Old Norse oxi, Old Frisian oxa, Middle Dutch osse, Old High German ohso, German ochse, and Gothic auhsa. The term then evolved into the Old English oxa and later into Middle English oxe. Its current form, ox, has come to mean 'a domestic bovine mammal' or, broadly, 'a bovine mammal'. Some definitions specify an ox as a "bull that has been castrated".

== Training ==
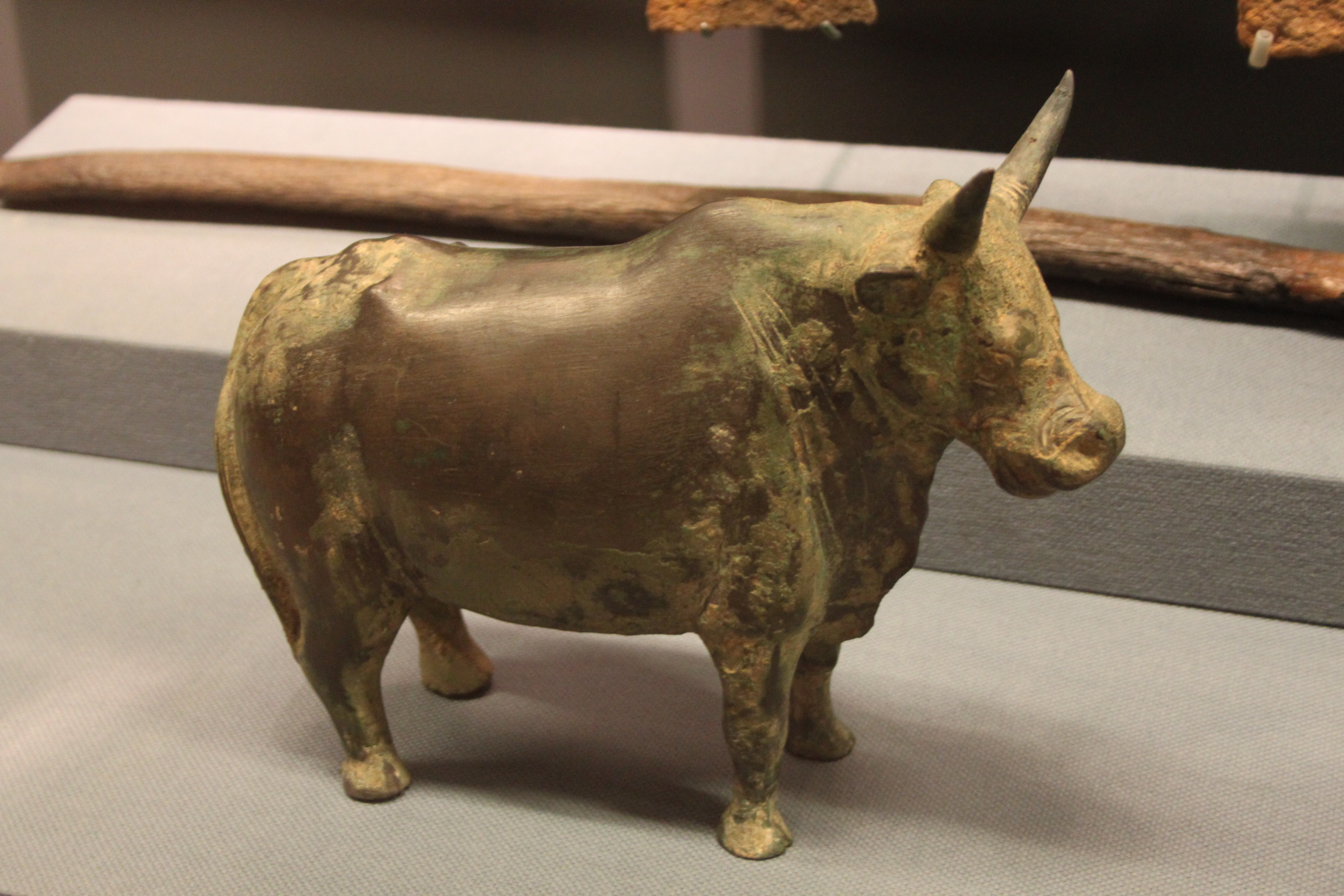
Tang dynasty bronze ox

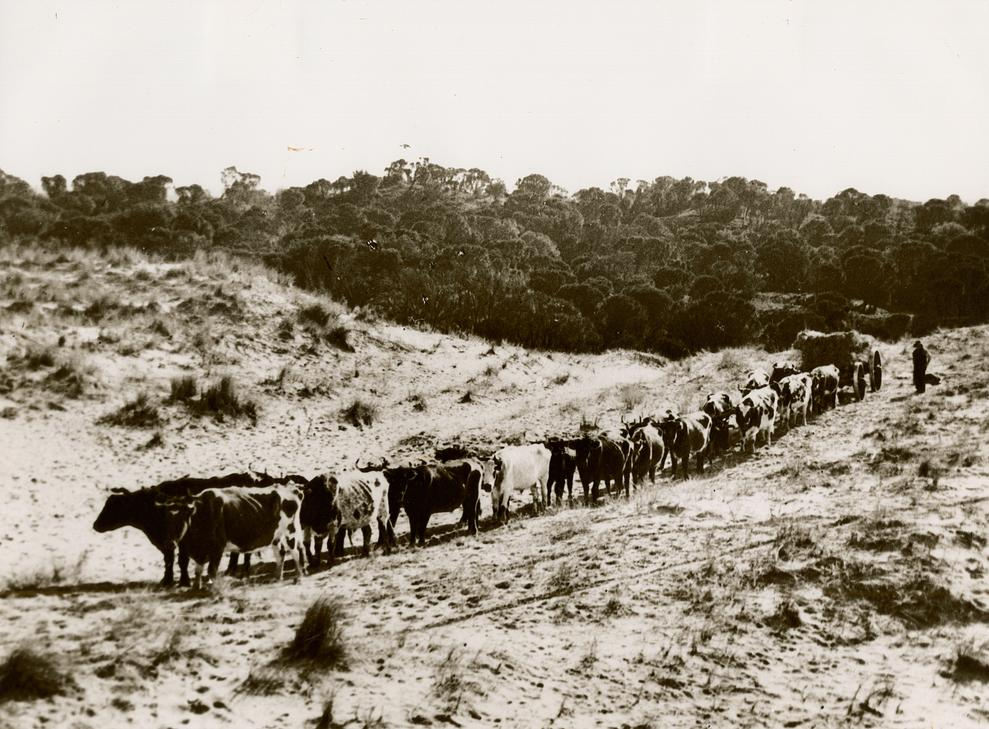
A team of ten pair of oxen in Australia, 1937

In the New England tradition, young castrated cattle selected for draft are known as working steers and are trained from a young age. Their teamster makes or buys as many as a dozen yokes of different sizes for each animal as it grows. The steers are normally considered fully trained at the age of four and only then become known as oxen.

Pairs of oxen were always hitched the same way round, and they were often given paired names. In southern England, it was traditional to call the near-side (left) ox of a pair by a single-syllable name and the off-side (right) one by a longer one (for example: Lark and Linnet, Turk and Tiger).

Ox trainers favour larger animals for their ability to do more work. Oxen are therefore usually of larger breeds, and are usually males because they are generally larger. Females can also be trained as oxen, but as well as being smaller are often more valued for producing calves and milk. Bulls (intact males) are also used in many parts of the world, especially in Asia and Africa.

== Shoeing ==
Working oxen usually require shoes, although in England not all working oxen were shod. Since their hooves are cloven, two shoes are required for each hoof, as opposed to a single shoe for horses. Ox shoes are usually of approximately half-moon or banana shape, either with or without caulkins, and are fitted in symmetrical pairs to the hooves. Unlike horses, oxen are not easily able to balance on three legs while a farrier shoes the fourth.

In England, shoeing was accomplished by throwing the ox to the ground and lashing all four feet to a heavy wooden tripod until the shoeing was complete. A similar technique was used in Serbia and, in a simpler form, in India, where it is still practiced.

In Italy, where oxen may be very large, shoeing is accomplished using a massive framework of beams in which the animal can be partly or completely lifted from the ground by slings passed under the body; the feet are then lashed to lateral beams or held with a rope while the shoes are fitted.

Such devices were made of wood in the past, but may today be of metal. Similar devices are found in France, Austria, Germany, Spain, Canada and the United States, where they may be called ox slings, ox presses or shoeing stalls.

The system was sometimes adopted in England also, where the device was called a crush or trevis; one example is recorded in the Vale of Pewsey. The shoeing of an ox partly lifted in a sling is the subject of John Singer Sargent's painting Shoeing the Ox, while A Smith Shoeing an Ox by Karel Dujardin shows an ox being shod standing, tied to a post by the horns and balanced by supporting the raised hoof.

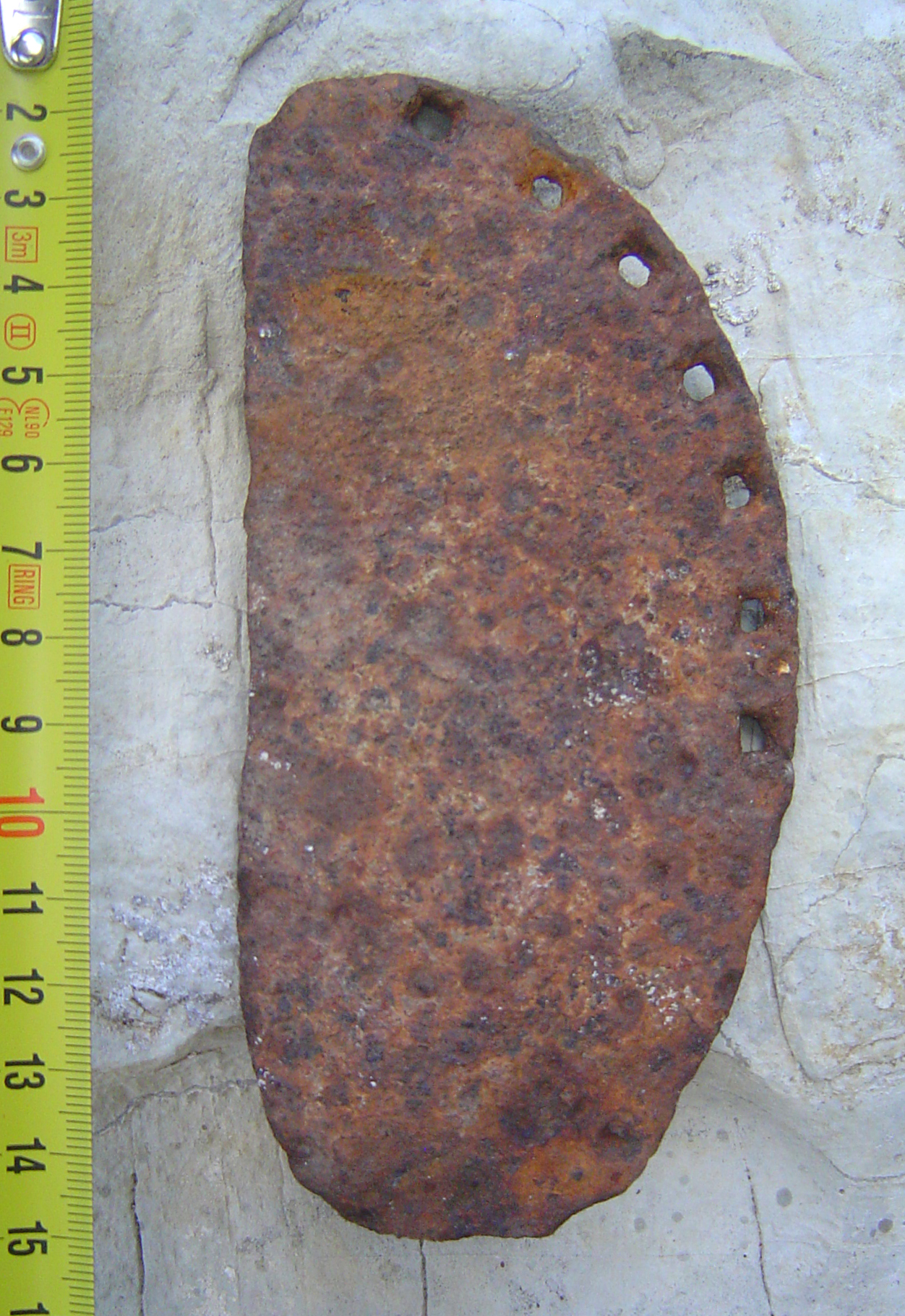
A single left-hand ox shoe of the type used for large Chianina oxen in Tuscany

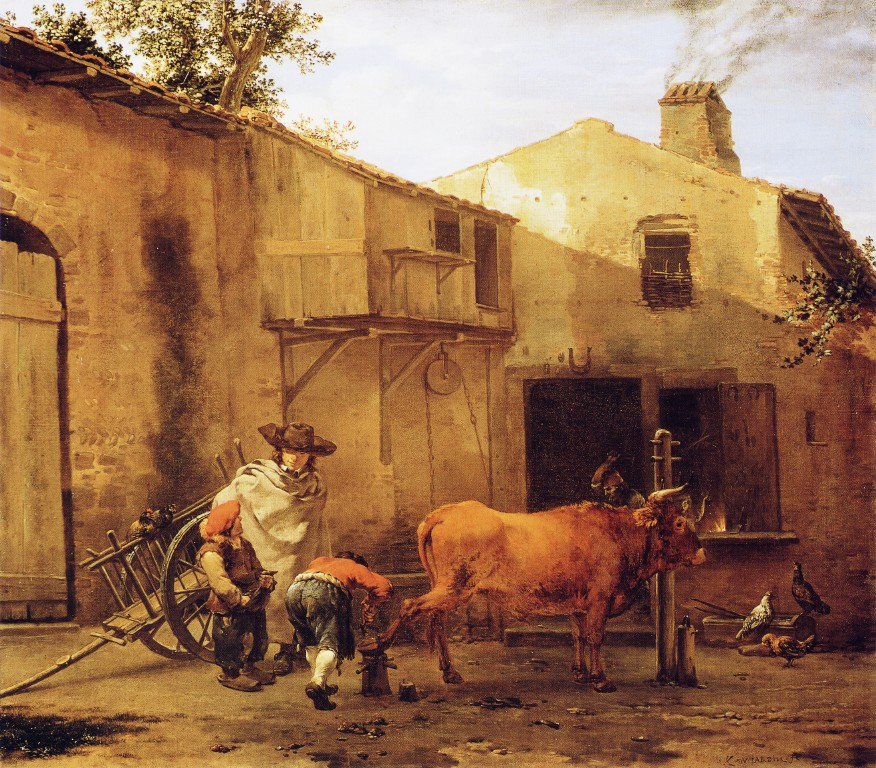
Karel Dujardin, 1622–1678: A Smith Shoeing an Ox

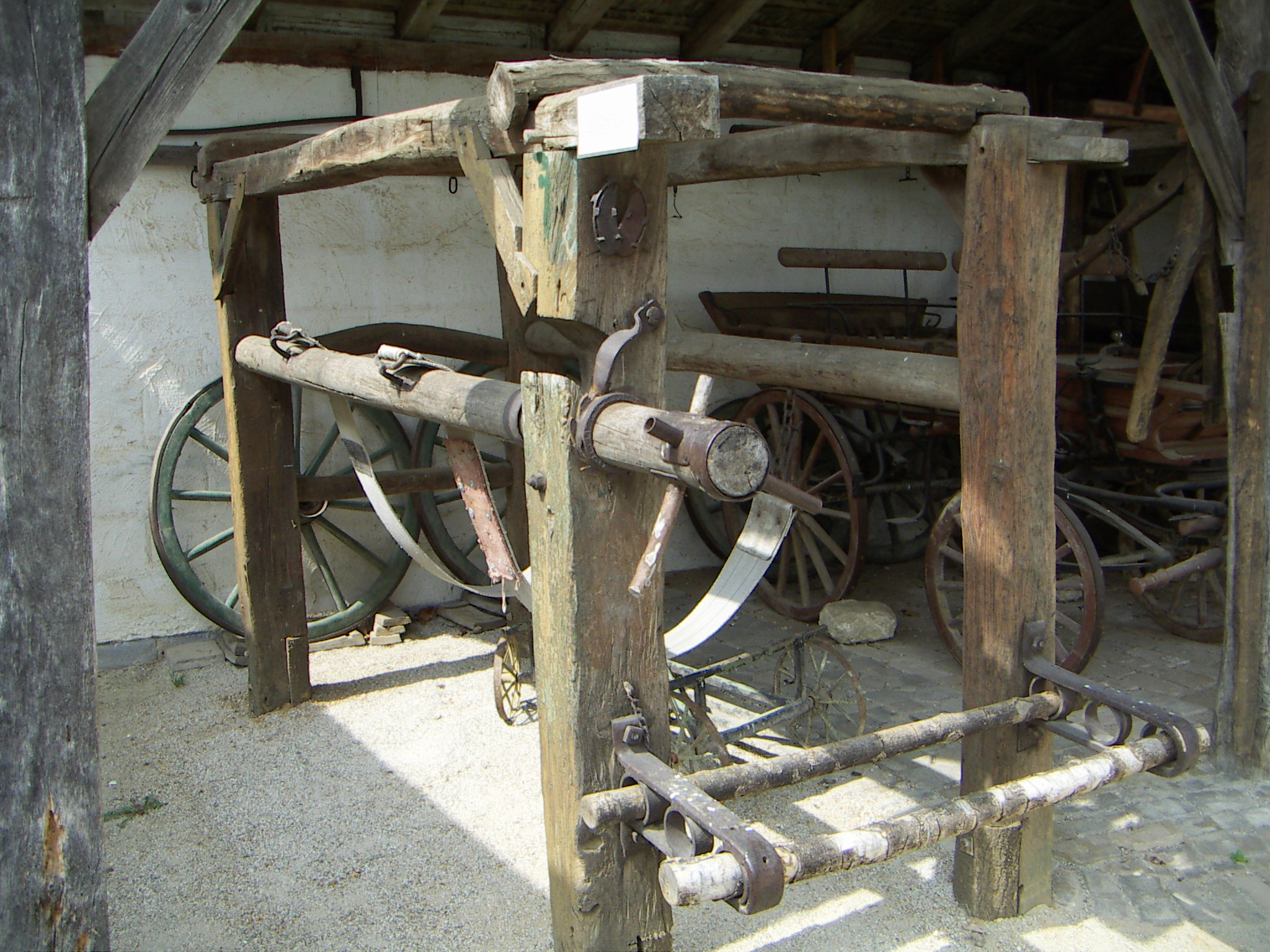
Ox shoeing sling in the Dorfmuseum of Mönchhof, Austria; a pair of ox shoes is attached to the near left column.

== Uses and comparison to horses ==
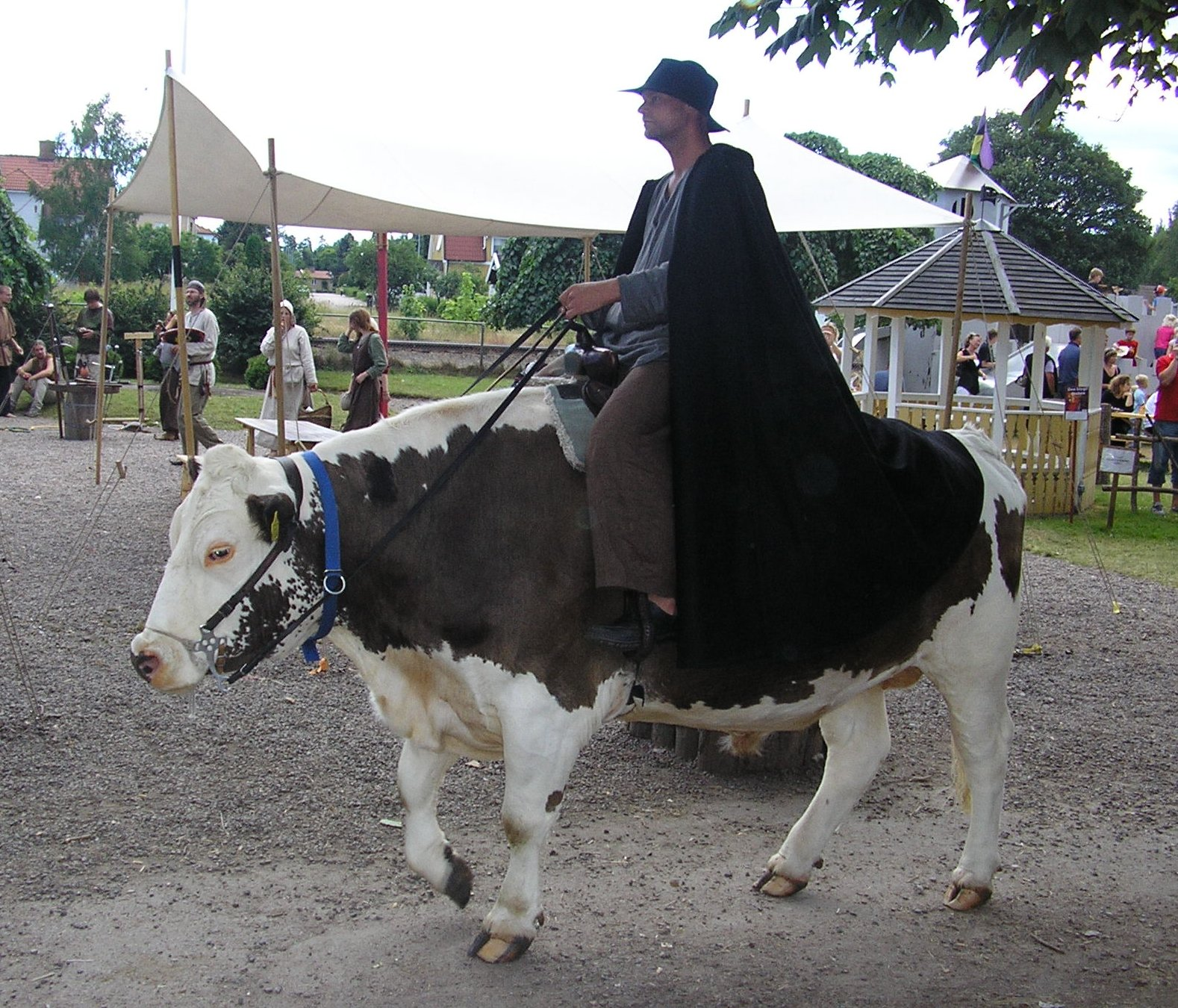
Riding an ox in Hova, Sweden, 2009

Oxen can pull heavier loads, and pull for a longer period of time than horses, depending on weather conditions.

On the other hand, they are also slower than horses, which has both advantages and disadvantages. Their pulling style is steadier, but they cannot travel as far in a given period of time. For agricultural purposes, oxen are more suitable for heavy tasks such as breaking sod or plowing in wet, heavy, or clay-filled soil.

When hauling freight, oxen can move very heavy loads in a slow and steady fashion. They are not as useful as horses when it is necessary to pull a plow or load of freight relatively quickly.

For millennia, oxen also could pull heavier loads because of the use of the yoke, which was designed to work best with the neck and shoulder anatomy of cattle. Until the invention of the horse collar, which allowed the horse to engage the pushing power of its hindquarters in moving a load, horses could not pull with their full strength because the yoke was incompatible with their anatomy. Yokes press on their chest, inhibiting their breathing.

== Types of oxen ==
The following are types of oxen:

- American Brahman
- American Milking Devon
- Ayrshire cattle
- Brown Swiss cattle
- Chianina
- Dutch Belted
- English Longhorn
- Hariana cattle
- Holstein Friesian
- North Devon cattle
- Ongole cattle
- Shorthorn
- Water buffalo
- Zebu

== See also ==
- Aurochs
- Bucranium; ox skulls used as a form of carved decoration commonly used in Classical architecture
- Ox (zodiac)
- Ox in Chinese mythology
- Oxtail
- Boeuf gras
