= Rotes Höhenvieh =

German breed of cattle

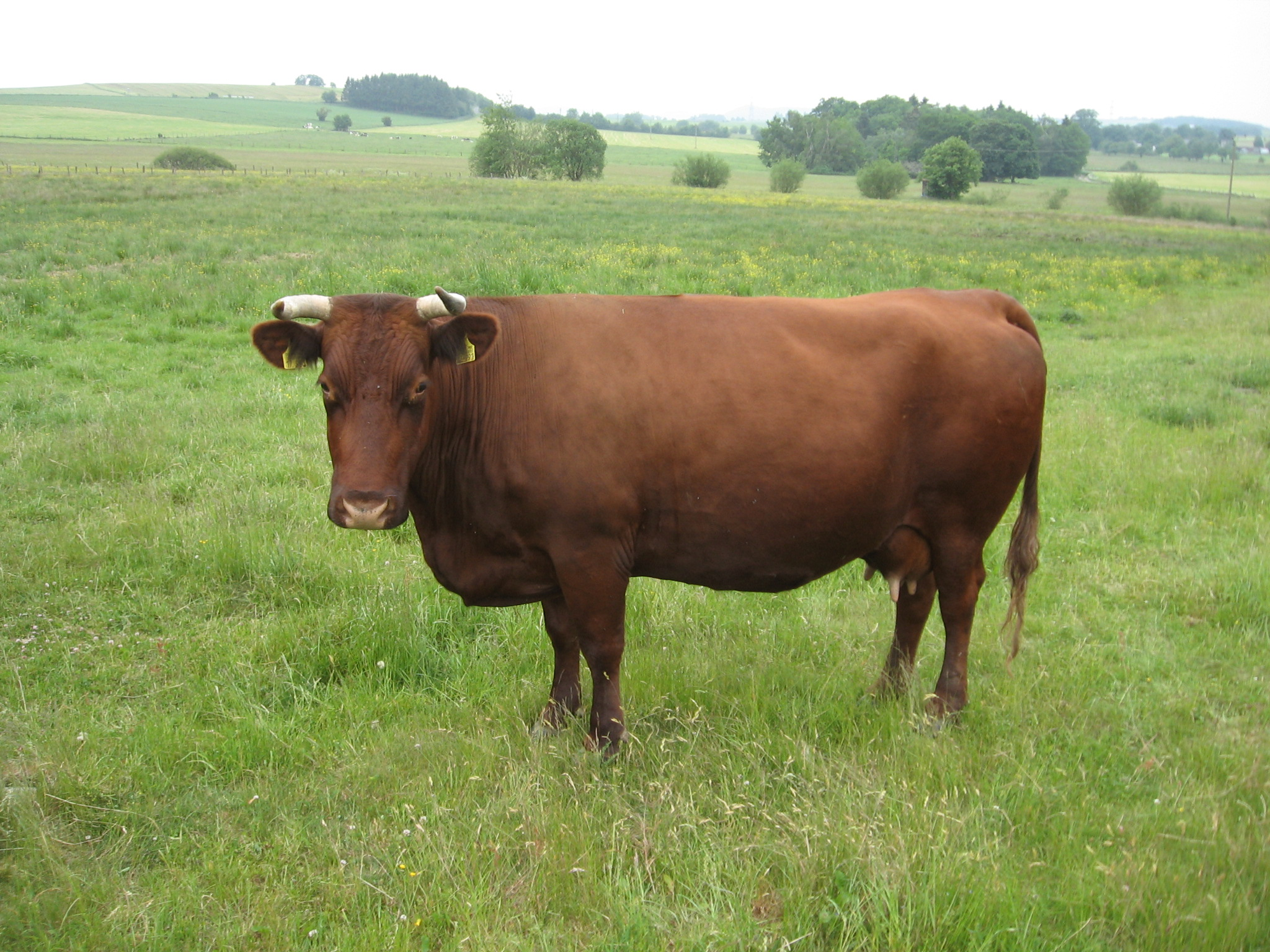
- German Red (Highland type) cow
- Conservation status: FAO (2007): endangered; GEH Red List: II, seriously endangered
- Other names: German Red (Highland type)
- Country of origin: Germany
- Distribution: Central Uplands
- Use: formerly triple-purpose: meat, milk, draught; now meat, vegetation management

Traits
- Weight: Male: 875 kg; Female: 600 kg
- Height: Male: 140–145 cm; Female: 130–135 cm
- Coat: red, with pale muzzle
- Horn status: horned
- Cattle; Bos (primigenius) taurus

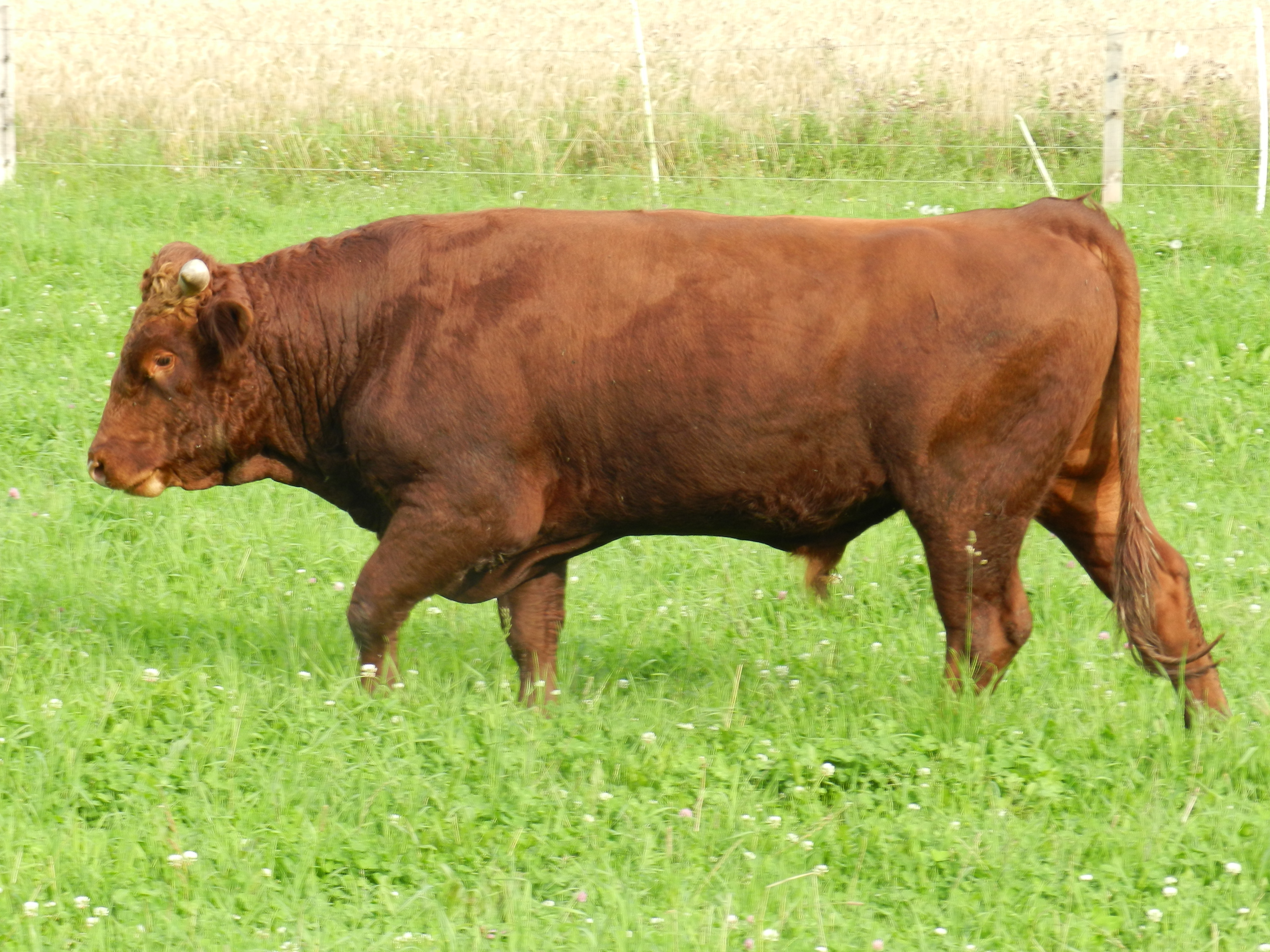
A bull

The Rotes Höhenvieh is a breed of red cattle from the Central Uplands of Germany. It was created in 1985 as a merger of the few remaining examples of a number of closely similar regional breeds of upland red cattle. Reconstruction of the breed was made possible by the discovery of a stock of semen in a sperm bank. The name means "red upland cattle".

== History ==
The mechanisation of agriculture in the years after the Second World War meant that the draught power of the traditional upland red cattle of the Central Uplands was no longer required. They became essentially useless, and by about 1980 had all but disappeared. Recovery of the breed was based on about 20 cows, not pure-bred but retaining some characteristics of the old breed, and on the rediscovery in the Zentralbesamungsstation or semen collection centre of Giessen, in Hesse, of about 60 doses of semen from a pure-bred bull.

The Rotes Höhenvieh was the first variety of Deutsches Rotvieh ('German Red') to adopt a recovery plan. Among other local varieties of the combined German Red herd-book to be re-established were the Waldeck, the Red Wittgenstein of Siegen-Wittgenstein in North Rhine-Westphalia, the Bavarian Red, the Thüringer Rotvieh ('Thuringia Red'), the Harzer Rotvieh and the Vogtland. Others including the Westerwald and Kelheimer were completely absorbed into the German Red and irretrievably lost.

Numbers of the Rotes Höhenvieh have risen steadily in recent years, from 387 in 1997 to 1521 in 2012. It was listed as "endangered" by the Food and Agriculture Organization of the United Nations in 2007, and is listed as "Category II: seriously endangered" on the Rote Liste or red list of the Gesellschaft zur Erhaltung alter und gefährdeter Haustierrassen. It was named the "endangered breed of the year" by the GEH in 1997.

== Use ==
Rotes Höhenvieh cows give about 4000 kg of milk per lactation; the milk has 3% fat and 4% protein.

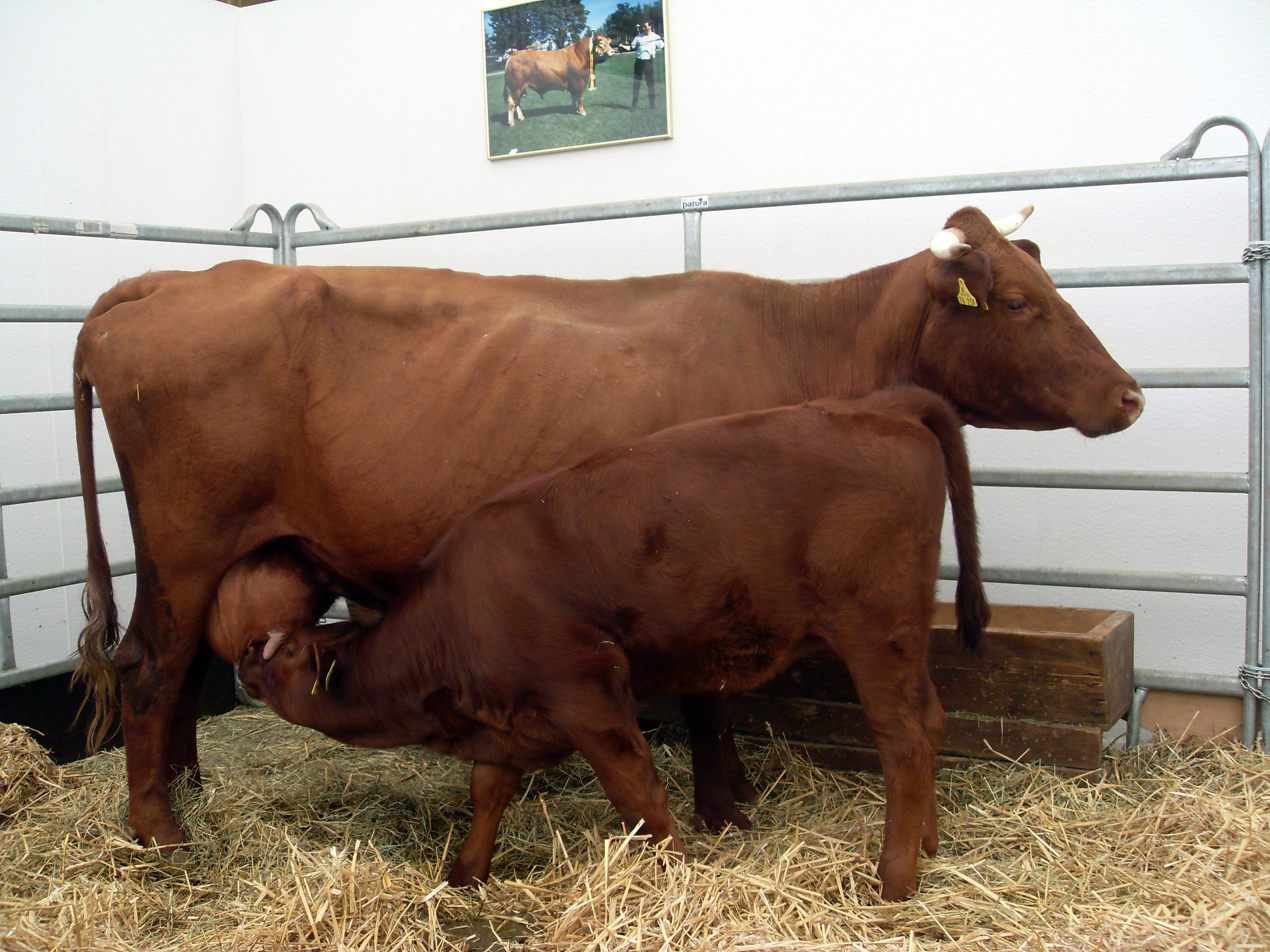
Cow with calf

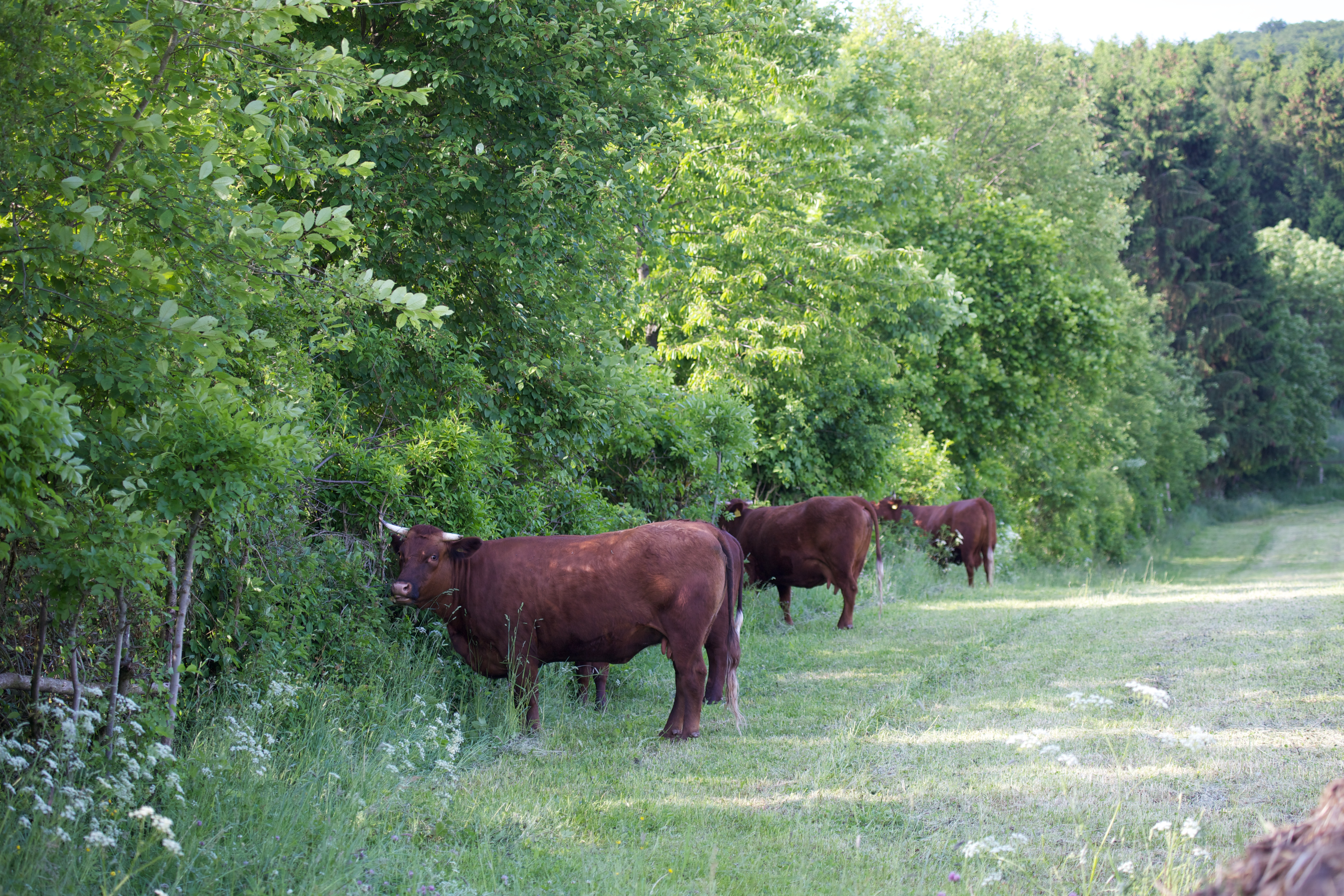
Use in vegetation management

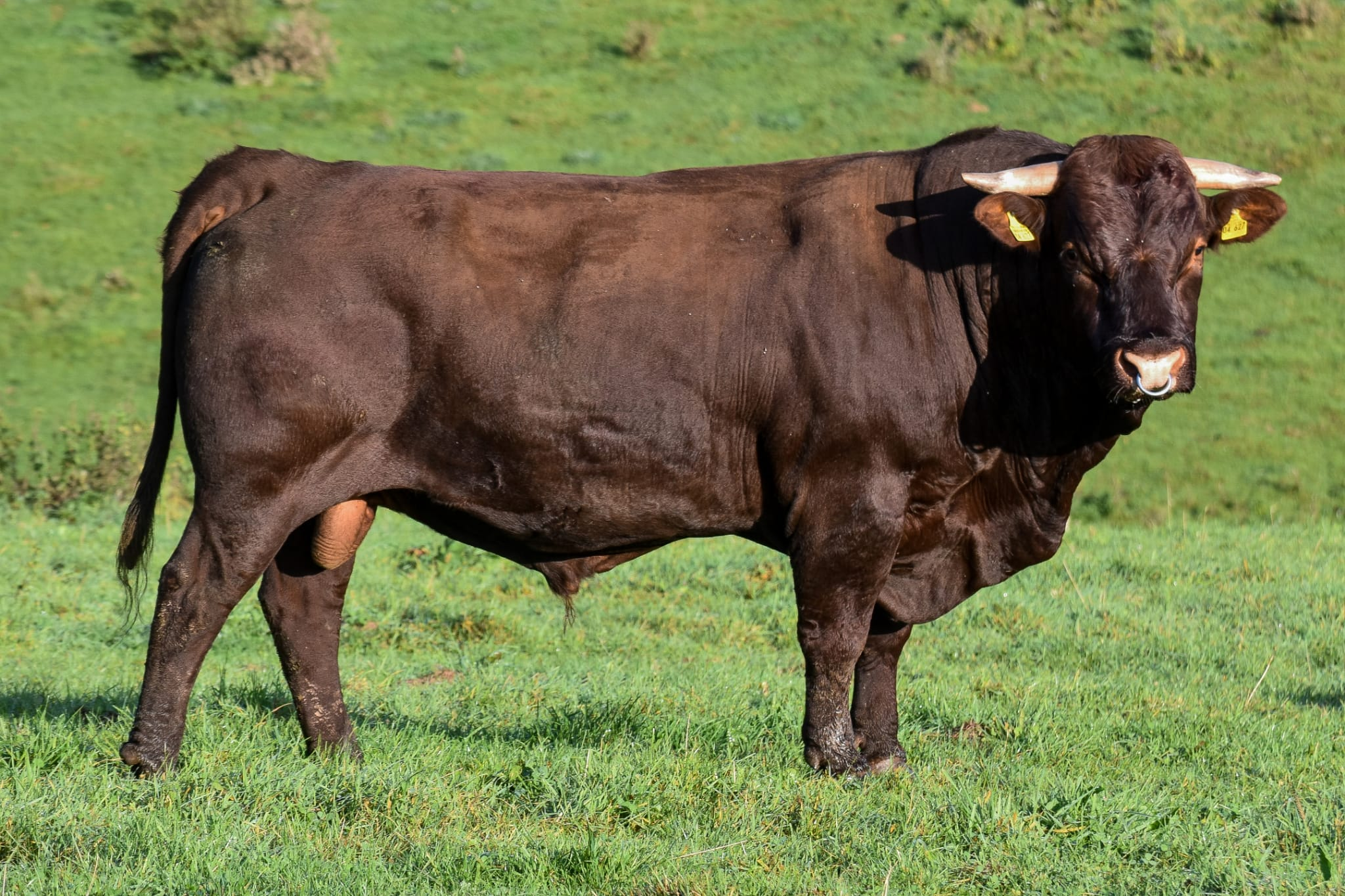
Rosso (DE0540404627), a bull with 77% Red Highland cattle genetics, the highest proportion documented in a living bull as of 2026.
