= Estonian Red =

Breed of cattle

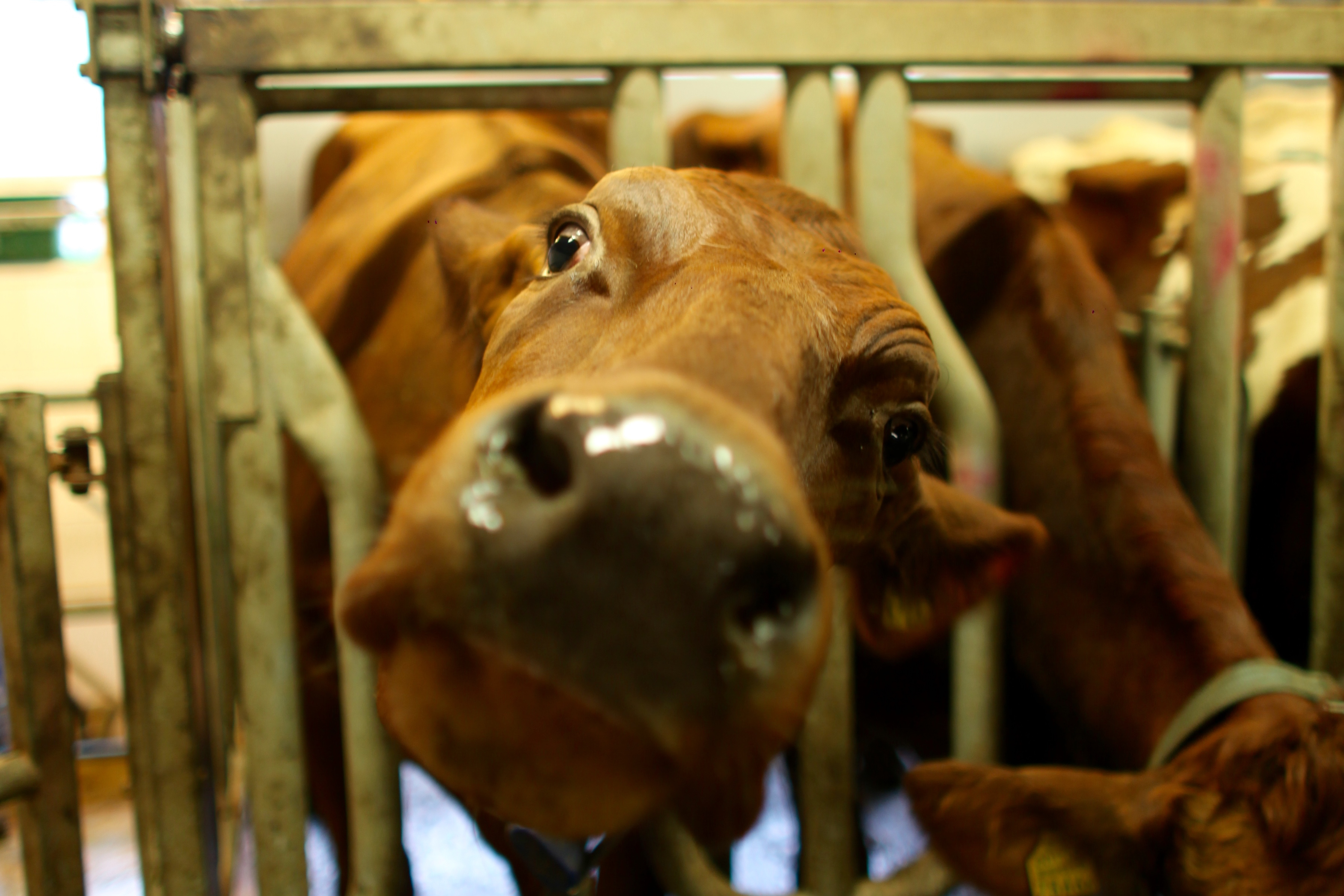
An Estonian Red cow in the barn of Estonian University of Life Sciences near Tartu

The Estonian Red (Estonian: Eesti punane veis) is an Estonian breed of dairy cattle. It was developed in the second half of the nineteenth century from cross-breeding of local cattle with imported stock of the Angeln, Danish Red and North Slesvig Red breeds. The coat is red, but sometimes it varies from red-white to brown and rarely black.

Its conservation status was not listed by the Food and Agriculture Organization of the United Nations in 2007; in 2021 it was reported to DAD-IS as "endangered". It is one of the constituent breeds of the European Red Dairy Breed.
