= Red Bull Racing (disambiguation) =

Red Bull Racing (RBR) is a Formula One team owned by Austrian beverage company Red Bull, based in England.

Red Bull Racing may also refer to:

- Red Bull Racing Team (RBRT), a defunct NASCAR Cup team owned by Red Bull based in Mooresville, North Carolina
- Triple Eight Race Engineering, an Australian Supercar team, competing as the Red Bull Ampol Racing Team
- Ten Kate Racing, a Superbike World Championship racing team that races under the name Red Bull Honda World Superbike Team
- A.Mattheis Motorsport, a Stock Car Brasil team owned by Andreas Mattheis that formerly competed as Red Bull Racing Brasil
- Alinghi Red Bull Racing, a yacht racing team organized to compete in the 2023 37th America's Cup
- AF Corse, a Deutsche Tourenwagen Masters team, that formerly competed as Red Bull AlphaTauri AF Corse

== See also ==
- Red Bull Powertrains, a Formula One power unit manufacturer
- Red Bull Junior Team, Red Bull's driver development program
- RB Formula One Team, formerly Scuderia AlphaTauri and Scuderia Toro Rosso (Italian: Team Red Bull), an F1 racing team
- Red Bull Drifting World Championship
- Red Bull Trolley Grand Prix
- Red Bull MotoGP Rookies Cup, a 125cc class run at selected rounds of MotoGP
- Red Bull Air Race World Series, an air racing world series
- Red Bull 400, an uphill sprint competition
- Red Bull (disambiguation)
