= Latvian Brown =

Breed of cattle

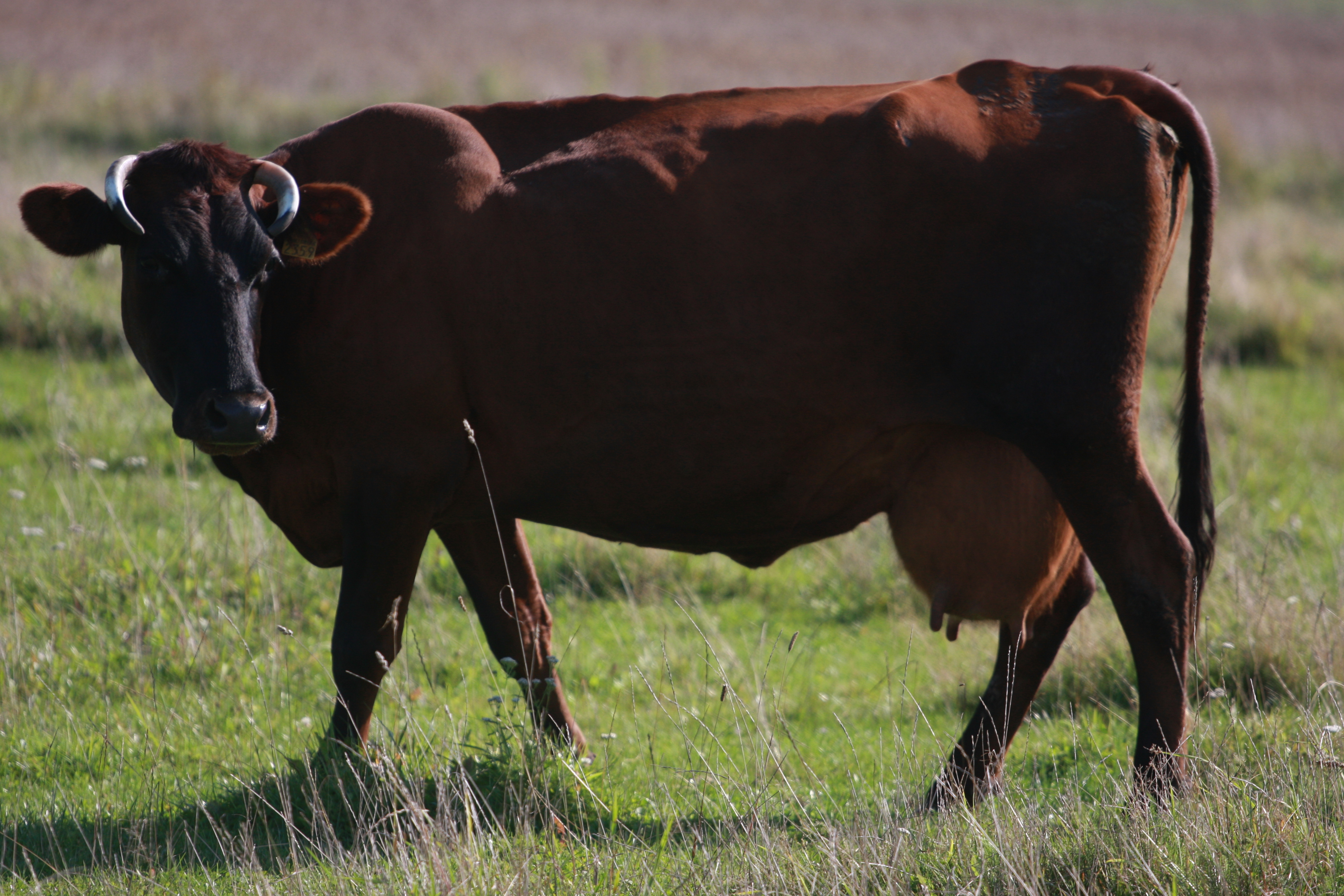

The Latvian Brown is a cattle breed that began to be formed when Angeln cattle were imported into Latvia to improve the local, low-productive cattle.

In 1947 the breed was given a new name - Red-Brown Latvian. By 1980, numbers had reached over one million.

These cattle vary in color from light-red to dark-red and the bulls can be as heavy as 1000 kilograms (2205 pounds).
