= Lithuanian Red =

Breed of cattle

- Country of origin: Lithuania

Traits
- Weight: 413 kilograms (as yearlings)

The Lithuanian Red (Lithuanian: Lietuvos žalieji) is a breed of cattle that was formed by crossing the Danish Red with the local Lithuanian cattle. In 1951 the cross was recognized as a new breed. It currently accounts for about 33% of the entire cattle population in Lithuania. The young stock of the Lithuanian Red breed are noted for their rapid growth rate, good food conversion and high carcass quality. When intensively fattened, steers weigh roughly 413 kilograms (911 pounds) as yearlings. Management is performed by the Lithuanian Red Cattle Improvement Association according to the National Red Cattle Improvement Selection Program. The Lithuanian Red Herd book was established in 1924.
