= Belted Galloway =

Scottish breed of cattle

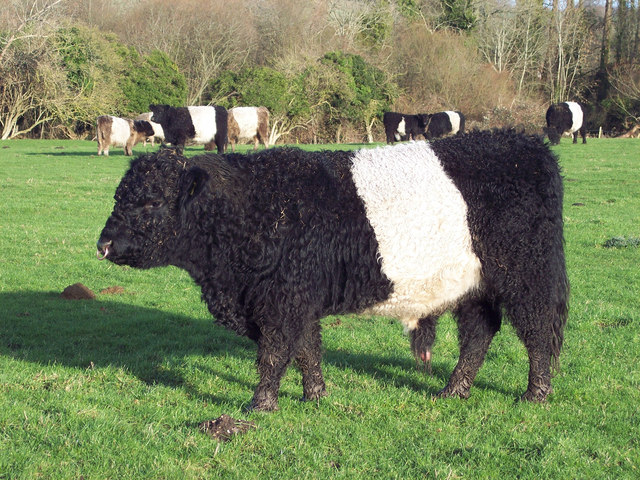
- Bull close to Bishopstone, near Salisbury

- Cow in the Lake District
- Conservation status: FAO (2007): not at risk; RBST (2019): not listed; Livestock Conservancy: recovering
- Other names: Beltie; Sheeted Galloway; White-middled Galloway
- Country of origin: United Kingdom (Scotland)
- Distribution: world-wide
- Use: beef; vegetation management

Traits
- Weight: Male: 750–1000 kg; Female: 450–600 kg
- Coat: black with broad white stripe around middle
- Horn status: polled

The Belted Galloway is a traditional Scottish breed of beef cattle. It derives from the Galloway stock of the Galloway region of south-western Scotland, and was established as a separate breed in 1921. It is adapted to living on the poor upland pastures and windswept moorlands of the region. The exact origin of the breed is unclear, although the white belt for which they are named, and which distinguishes the breed from black Galloway cattle, is often surmised to be the result of cross-breeding with the similarly coloured Dutch Lakenvelder.

The cattle are reared principally for beef; they may also be kept for ornament or for conservation grazing (vegetation management).

== History ==
The Belted Galloway derives from the traditional Galloway stock of the Galloway region of south-western Scotland, which in turn form part of a broader group of traditional Scottish cattle including the Aberdeen Angus and Highland breeds. The Galloway is most often black, but other colours occur; the white-belted or white-middled Galloway was one of them. The origin of the white belt is unknown; it is thought to have resulted from some cross-breeding with the Dutch Lakenvelder in the seventeenth century.

From 1852, both Aberdeen Angus and Galloways could be registered in a herd-book for polled cattle. A separate Galloway herd-book was established in 1878. In 1921 a group of breeders set up the Dun and Belted Galloway Association, which – as the name suggests – registered both belted and dun-coloured animals; its first herd-book was published in 1922. In 1951 registration of non-belted dun cattle was discontinued, and the society changed its name to the Belted Galloway Society. It also maintains herd-books for the Red Galloway and the White Galloway.

In the twentieth century the Belted Galloway was exported to many countries including Australia, Brazil, Canada, France, Germany, the Netherlands, New Zealand and the United States. Breed societies were started in New Zealand in 1948, in the United States in 1951, and in Australia in 1975.

Like other breeds, the Belted Galloway suffered heavily during the epidemic of foot-and-mouth disease in the British Isles in 2001, and a substantial part of the total population was lost. By 2007, numbers had recovered to the point where it could be removed from the endangered native breed watchlist of the Rare Breeds Survival Trust; in the same year the global breed population was listed by the Food and Agriculture Organization of the United Nations as 'not at risk'. In 2012, there were approximately 3500 registered breeding cows in the United Kingdom.

In 2022 it was listed by the American Livestock Conservancy as "watch"; in 2015 the total number in the United States was reported to be 1468.

== Characteristics ==
The cattle are always belted, with a broad white belt completely encircling the body between the shoulder and the hind legs. For bulls, no white is permitted anywhere else on the animal; cows with some limited white markings on the lower legs can be registered in an appendix of the herd-book. The rest of the coat is normally black, but can also be dun or – more rarely – red. The dun colour is caused by a mutation in the PMEL gene, the same mutation that causes dun and silver dun in Highland cattle. The coat is double: a long coarse outer coat gives protection from rain, and a fine soft undercoat keeps the animal warm; the cattle do not need to develop thick subcutaneous fat for warmth in winter, and the meat tends to leanness as a result.

Body weights may depend both on climatic conditions and on the type of forage available. They are usually in the range 450 to 600 kg for cows, and 750 to 1000 kg for bulls. Belted Galloways are generally of a quiet temperament, but cows have a strong maternal instinct and protect calves against perceived threats. At least one person has been trampled by a herd of these cattle.

The Belted Galloway is well adapted to harsh climatic conditions, hill terrain and rough grazing on coarse grasses; it is normal for the cattle to be kept out throughout the winter, regardless of the weather.

== Use ==
The Belted Galloway is reared mainly for beef; it may also be used for vegetation management, otherwise known as conservation grazing. Cattle reared on forage alone may take up to four years to be ready for slaughter; beef from such cattle may have higher-than-usual levels of omega-3 polyunsaturated fatty acids.

An old strain is listed as the "Original Belted Galloway Cattle" in the Ark of Taste of the Slow Food Foundation for Biodiversity.

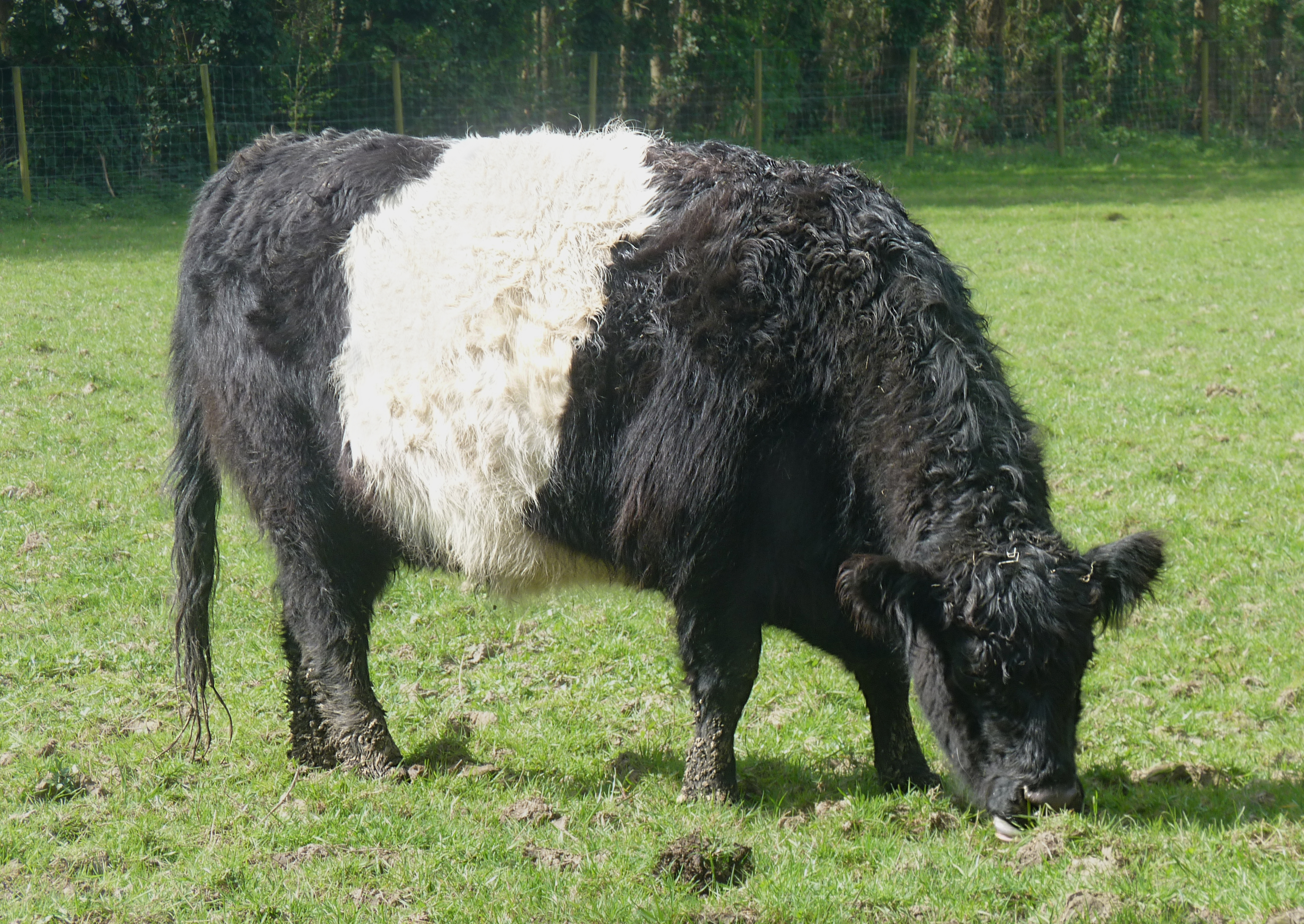
Cow in Belgium

Bull in Denmark

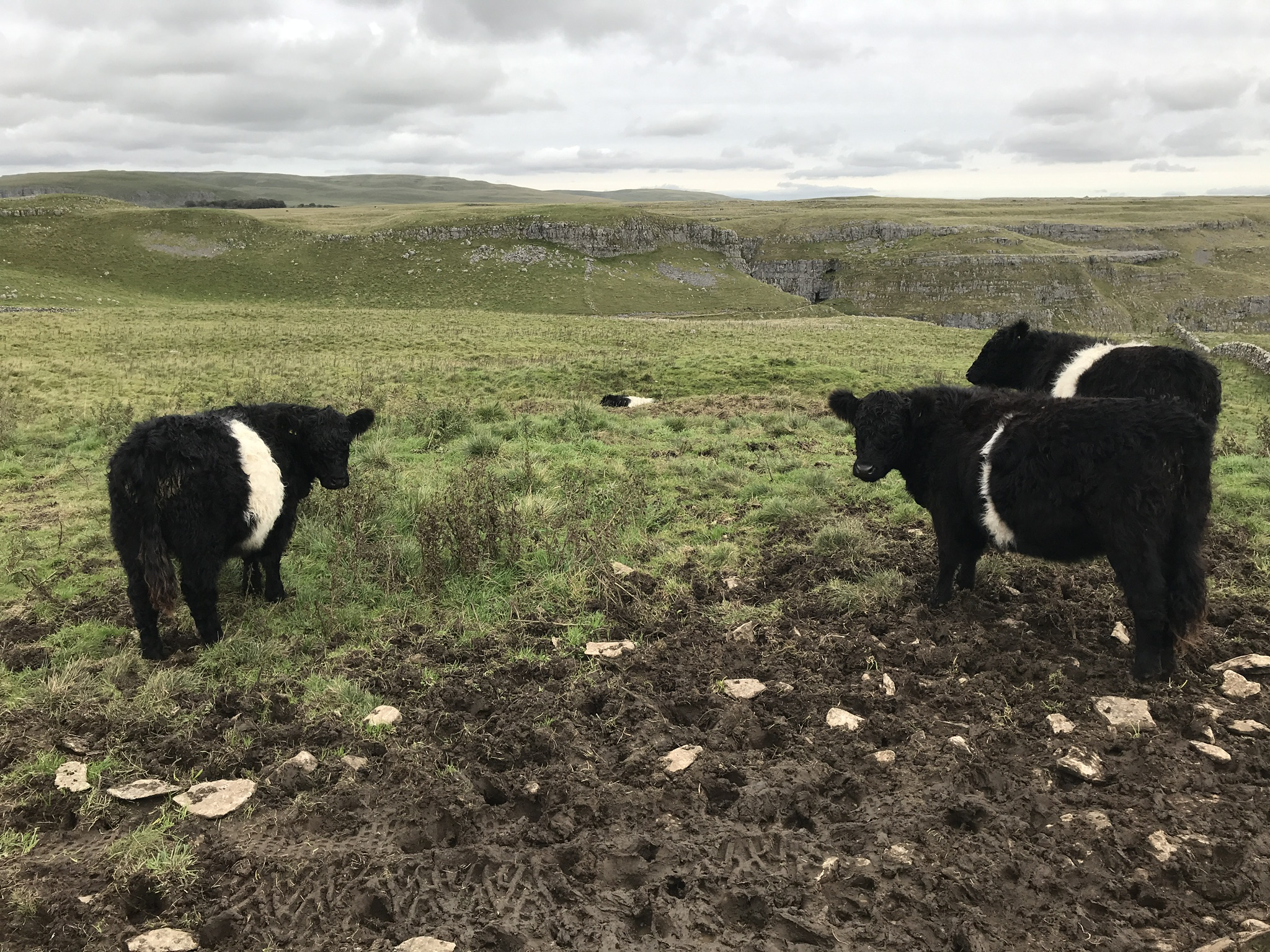
In the Yorkshire Dales

Red bull calf in Gloucestershire
