= Dutch Belted =

American breed of cattle

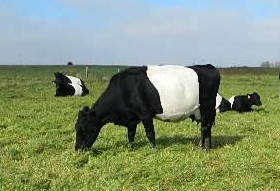
- Conservation status: FAO (2007): endangered; Livestock Conservancy (2021): critical; DAD-IS (2022): endangered-maintained
- Other names: American Dutch Belted; Dutch Belt
- Country of origin: United States
- Use: dairy

Traits
- Weight: Male: average 760 kg; Female: average 544 kg
- Coat: black or red, with broad white belt
- Horn status: usually horned; may be polled
- Cattle; Bos (primigenius) taurus

The Dutch Belted or Dutch Belt is an American breed of dairy cattle. It derives from the Lakenvelder of Germany and the Netherlands, of which examples were imported to the United States from 1838. It became an important dairy breed in the early twentieth century, but could not compete with the Holstein-Friesian. By 1970 it was close to extinction; from 1993 the American Livestock Breeds Conservancy (later The Livestock Conservancy) was active in the recovery of the breed. In 2021 it was listed as "critical" on the watchlist of the conservancy.

== History ==
The first importation of Lakenvelder stock into the United States was in 1838, when D.H. Haight brought some to Goshen, New York; others were brought to Orange County and to Pennsylvania in 1848, and a single cow was imported to New Jersey in 1906. In the 1840s P.T. Barnum exhibited some in his travelling circus. Sixteen of the cattle were shown in Chicago in 1893 at the World's Columbian Exposition. A breed society, the Dutch Belted Cattle Association of America, was formed in 1886 or 1901; it was incorporated in New Jersey in 1909.

By 1916 the Dutch Belted, as it was now known, had spread to some twenty-five states and had reached about 1500 in number. It became well-known as a useful dairy breed, but numbers never rose very high. With the rapid spread of the Holstein in the mid-twentieth century, numbers fell and in the 1970s the breed association became dormant. In the 1980s, further pressure on the breed came from the policy of the Department of Agriculture to encourage the sale of dairy cattle for beef, with the aim of increasing the price of milk.

From 1993 the American Livestock Breeds Conservancy (later The Livestock Conservancy) was active in the recovery of the breed and conducted a survey, which found that between 1981 and 1995 the average number of annual registrations had been 28 (21 cows and 7 bulls); in 1995 the total number of registered purebred stock was 34.

By 2010 the population had increased to total of about 1500 head, including some 70 bulls and 700 breeding cows. The breed association resumed registrations in 2013. In 2016 the total Dutch Belted population was reported to DAD-IS at 464; in 2021 the breed was listed as "critical" on the watchlist of the Livestock Conservancy.

== Characteristics ==
The cattle are either black or red, with a broad white belt encircling the back, flanks and belly. Average weights are approximately 760 kg for bulls and 545 kg for cows.
