= Red Tambov =

Breed of cattle

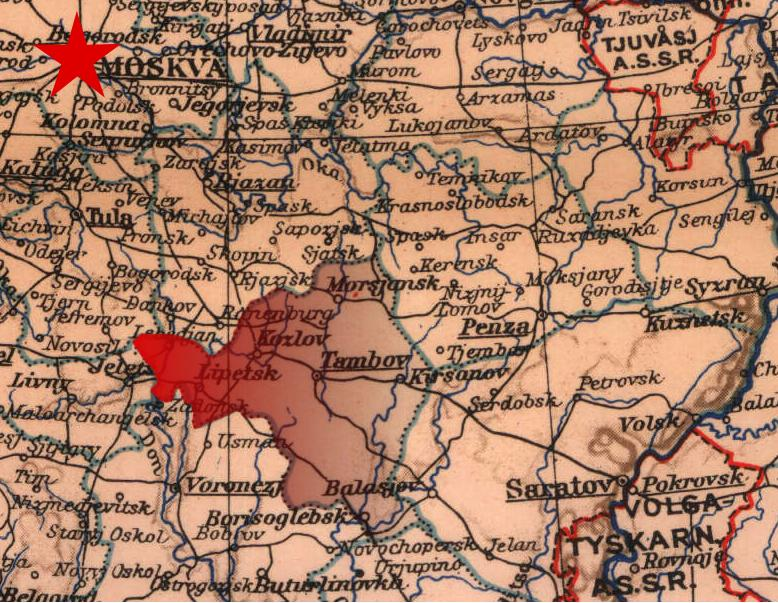
Map of the Tambov region

Red Tambov cattle (Russian: Kpacнaя тaмбoвcкaя, Krasnaya tambovskaya) are a cattle breed from the Tambov Oblast of Russia.

The breed, used for milk and beef production, was formed in the mid 19th century by crossing cattle from the Tyrol and some Devon and Simmental onto the local cattle. From 1911 Prof. M.M. Pridorogin recommended closed breeding of the cattle to conserve some of their adaptations to the local conditions. After 1924 the Kirsanov state breeding station and the Lenin collective farm in Kirsanov district were responsible for developing the breed. The breed numbered some 45,000 in 1980.

== Characteristics ==
The cattle are coloured various shades of red with occasional white markings on the abdomen, udder, chest and legs. Cows are typically 127 cm. tall at the withers.
