= Red Bull Salzburg =

Red Bull Salzburg may refer to:

- FC Red Bull Salzburg, association football club
- EC Red Bull Salzburg, ice hockey club
