= Danish Red =

Danish breed of cattle

- Conservation status: FAO (2007): not listed; DAD-IS (2026): not at risk
- Other names: Fünen; Fynsk; Red Dane; Red Danish; Red Danish Dairy; Rød Dansk Malkerace; Rød Dansk Malkekvæg
- Country of origin: Denmark
- Cattle; Bos (primigenius) taurus

The Danish Red or Rød Dansk Malkerace is a Danish breed of dairy cattle. It derives from the traditional local cattle breeds of the islands of Fyn (Funen) and Sjælland (Zealand), with influence from red cattle from elsewhere in Europe. It falls within a group of red Central European breeds, many of which now form part of the modern European Red Dairy Breed group.

There are two distinct and separate types: the modern Rød Dansk Malkerace, which since about 1975 has been heavily influenced by cross-breeding with imported American Brown Swiss and other breeds; and the traditional type, the Rød Dansk Malkerace anno 1970 or RDM-1970.

== History ==
The first recorded use of the name 'Rød Dansk Malkekvæg' was in 1878, at a farmers' assembly in Svendborg; a herd-book was started in 1885. A breed society, the Landsforeningen for Rød Dansk Malkerace, was formed in Skejby in Aarhus in 1967, and became inactive in 2002.

The breed was developed in Denmark based on local breeds bred with Angeln cattle from Angeln, Schleswig. Danish Red cattle (and, earlier, Angeln cattle) have been imported to many other countries and have been used to improve and form many local breeds, such as Lithuanian Red, Estonian Red, Latvian Red, Polish Red, Belarus Red, Tambov Red (Russian Red), Bulgarian Red, etc.

Between 1934 and about 1960 the cattle were reared in the United States, where they known as 'Red Dane'; from about 1948 to 1968 they were also bred – as the 'Dinemarquês' – in Brazil. Some were exported in the 1960s and 1970s to India and to Thailand, where experimental crosses were made with zebuine breeds such as the Hallikar, Red Sindhi and Sahiwal. They are good milk cows, yielding milk with higher butter fat and protein content than the Holstein Friesian does.
