= Red bull (slang) =

Political slang in Vietnam

Red bull (feminine: red cow) (Note: Vietnamese: Bò đỏ) is a pejorative label from Vietnamese social media used to describe Vietnamese public opinion commentator. Red bulls not only support Vietnamese government unreasonably but also monitor active Internet users and harass or scare dissidents. This label is similar to 50 Cent Party of the Chinese Communist Party (CCP).

Other political extremist groups aside from the red bull include the "yellow bull" or "yellow cow", which describe the extreme opposition group of red bull, who anti-communists or held a revisionist view of the defunct South Vietnam. The slang was inspired by the South Vietnam flag and its yellow background.

Both "red/yellow oxen" pejorative terms are also used by Overseas Vietnamese communities to denigrate people with opposing political beliefs within these communities.

Sometimes, people who do not criticize the Vietnamese government or praise state-made films such as Đào, phở và piano are labeled as red bulls. According to PhD Nguyễn Phương Mai, this is an indication of political polarization.

== See also ==
- Politics of Vietnam
- Public opinion brigades
- State-sponsored Internet propaganda
- Vatnik
