= Lakenvelder cattle =

Dutch breed of dairy cattle

Lakenvelder
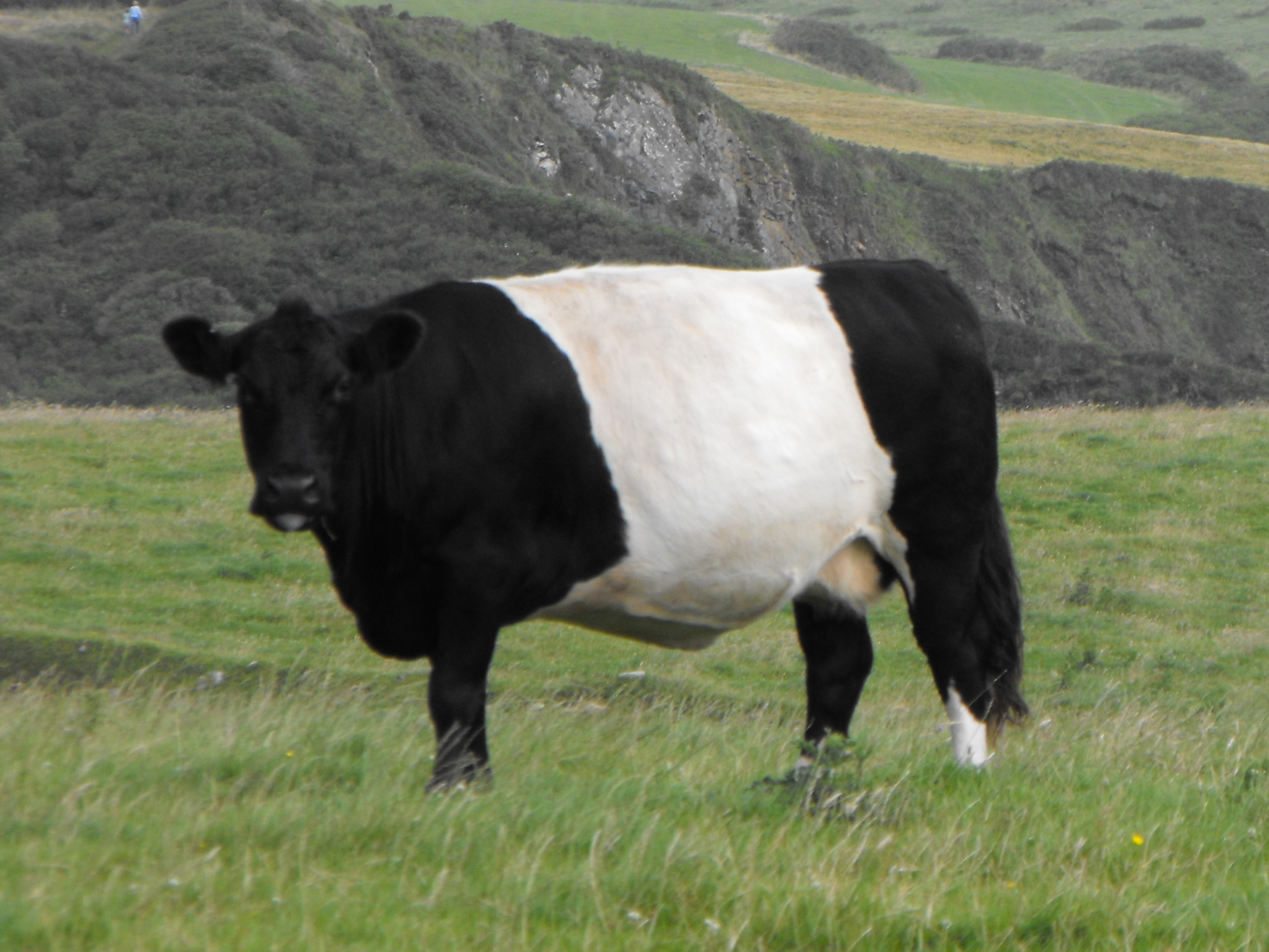
- Conservation status: FAO (2007): not listed; DAD-IS (2022): endangered-maintained
- Country of origin: Netherlands
- Use: dual-purpose, dairy and beef

Traits
- Weight: Male: 700 kg; Female: 550 kg
- Height: Male: 137 cm; Female: 126–136 cm
- Coat: black or dusky red, with broad white belt
- Horn status: horned; rarely polled
- Cattle; Bos (primigenius) taurus

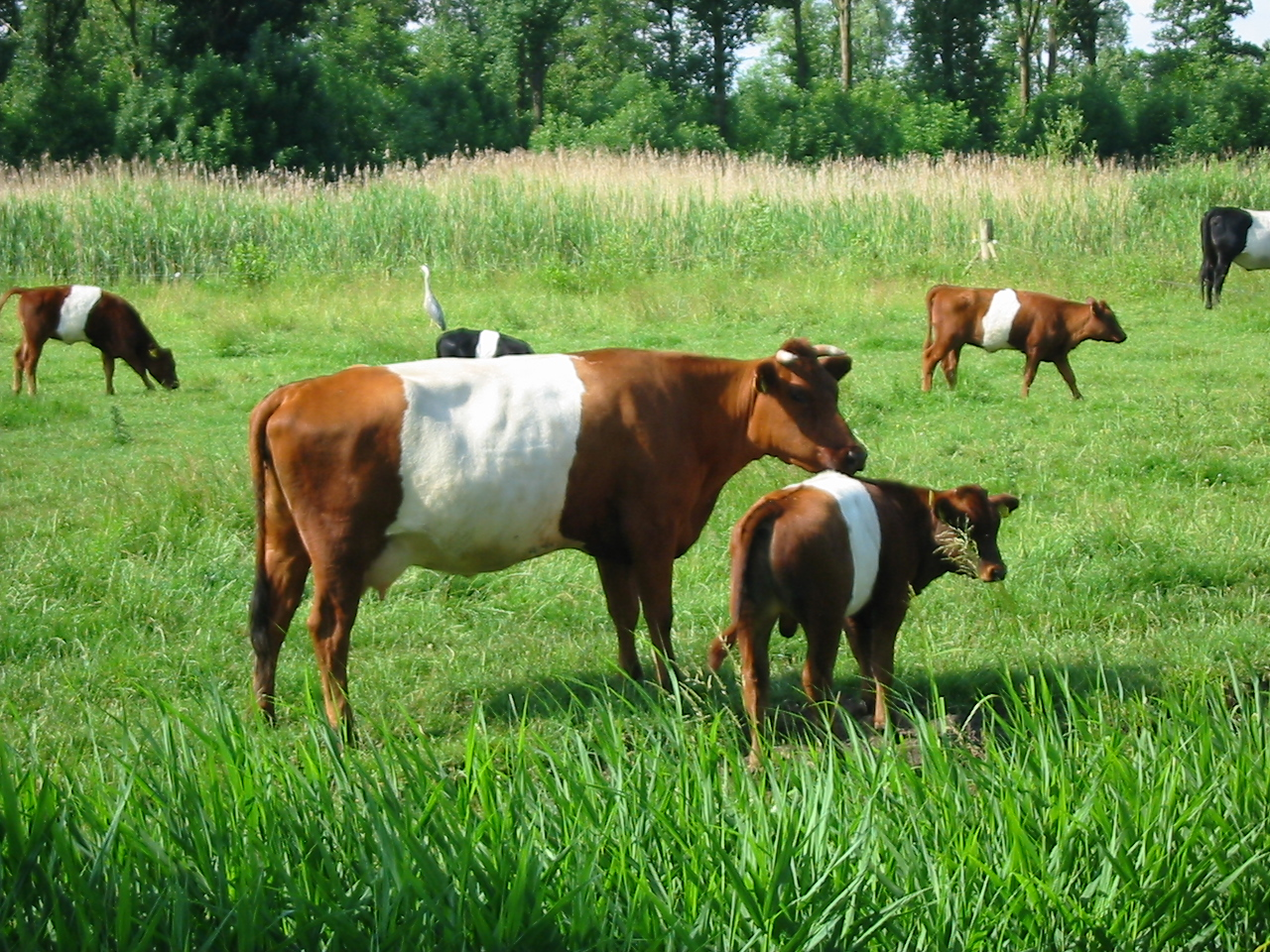
Lakenvelders near Leusden, the Netherlands

The Lakenvelder is a Dutch and German breed of dairy cattle. It is reported from the Netherlands and Belgium, but may be extinct in Germany.

== History ==
No written evidence supports an often-repeated claim that the Lakenvelder derives from cattle of the Gurtenvieh or belted Braunvieh of Switzerland, brought to the Netherlands in or after Mediaeval times by the nobility or the wealthy. It is however supported by molecular genetic studies, which have shown that the Gurtenvieh, the Lakenvelder and the Belted Galloway all carry the same candidate gene for the belted phenotype. Cattle with this characteristic are shown in Dutch paintings from the seventeenth century. It seems likely that the Lakenvelder derives directly from Swiss and Austrian belted cattle, and that during the reign of William of Orange some cattle of this type found their way to Scotland, where they inter-bred with Galloway stock, giving rise to the Belted Galloway.

A herd-book for the Lakenvelder was started in 1918; at that time there were about fifteen farms breeding the cattle, with some 200 head between them. In 1930 regulations were introduced to control milk production and to make testing for tuberculosis obligatory; by the end of the Second World War only five herds remained.

== Characteristics ==
The Lakenvelder is finely built and of small to medium size, with a withers height in the range 126–136 cm for cows and averaging 133 cm or 137 cm for bulls. Body weights are variously reported as 500 kg or 700 kg for bulls, and 450 kg or 550 kg for cows.

The coat may be either black or dusky red, always with a broad belt of white encircling the body behind the shoulder and in front of the hip; black and red animals are in approximately equal numbers. There are no other white markings on the head or body; the horns, tongue and udder are pigmented. Both sexes normally carry horns, but polled animals can occur.

== Use ==
It is a dual-purpose breed, with both dairy and beef strains. Beef yields are not high, but the meat is of good quality and has achieved good results in comparative taste tests. The milk is high in protein and low in fat; milk yields are of the order of 5000–6000 kg per year.
