= Polish Red =

Breed of cattle

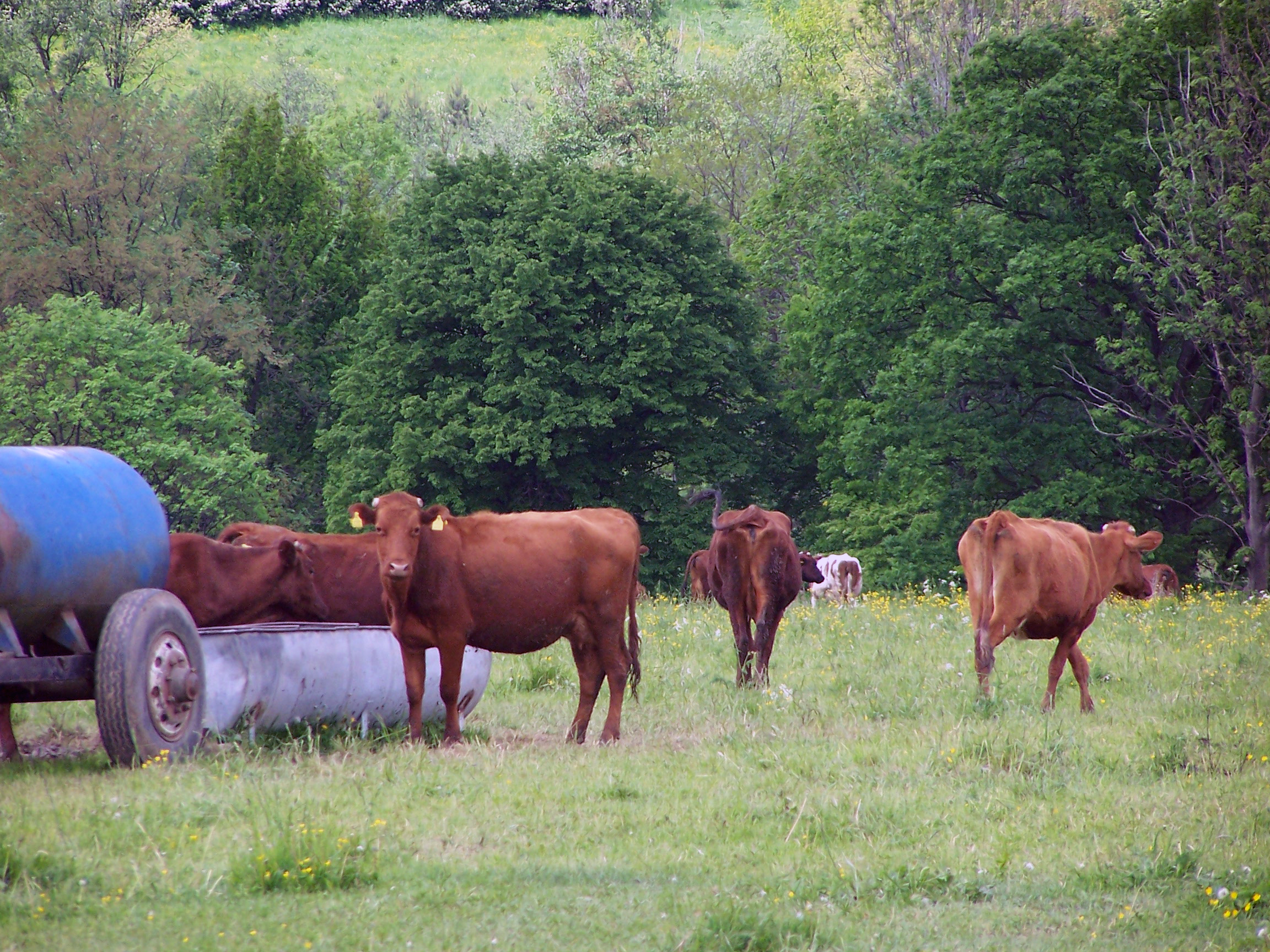
Cows in the Lesser Poland voivodeship, near Szczyrzyc

The Polish Red, Polish: 'Polska czerwona', is a Polish breed of dual-purpose cattle. It was established in the late 19th century, when red cattle from Denmark, Germany and Sweden were cross-bred with various local strains of red Polish cattle.

== Characteristics ==
Cows weigh 500 kg on average and stand about 128 cm at the withers; bulls average 770 kg in weight and 139 cm in height.

== Use ==
Cows produce approximately 4000 kg of milk per year, with a fat content of some 4–4.5%.
