= Angeln cattle =

German breed of cattle

Angeln
- Conservation status: Modern type: FAO (2007): not at risk; DAD-IS (2026): not at risk; Traditional type: FAO (2007): endangered; DAD-IS (2026): at risk/critical; GEH (2026): I: extremely endangered
- Other names: Angler; Angler Rind alter Zuchtrichtung; Angler Rotvieh; Angler-Deutsches Rotvieh; Deutsches Rotvieh-Angler; Red Angeln; Rotvieh alter Angler Zuchtrichtung
- Country of origin: Germany
- Distribution: world-wide
- Use: milk

Traits
- Coat: deep red

Die Angler Kuh, historic illustration of a cow by Benno Adam, 1851

The Angeln or Angler is a German breed of cattle originally from Angeln in Schleswig-Holstein, formerly a part of Denmark. The coat is a uniform solid dark red, and the skin is pigmented (black).

Its history is closely linked to that of the Danish Red, which developed with Angeln influence in the nineteenth century, and was later used to improve the Angeln. Both fall within a group of red Central European breeds, many of which now form part of the modern European Red Dairy Breed group.

In the twenty-first century two types are recognised: the modern Angeln, which has substantial introgression from Finnish Ayrshire, Red Holstein and Swedish Red-and-White and is known as the Deutsches Rotvieh-Angler; and the endangered traditional type, the Angler Rind alter Zuchtrichtung or Rotvieh alter Angler Zuchtrichtung.

== History ==
A breed society was formed in 1879, and a herd-book was started in 1885.

== Characteristics ==
In the traditional type, body weights for cows are usually between 450 and 650 kg and heights at the withers from 126 to 142 cm; bulls weigh on average 1100 kg and stand about 150 cm. In the modern type, average weight for cows is about 650 kg with a height of some 140 to 145 cm; bulls weigh approximately 1000 kg and stand about 155 cm.

== Use ==
In 2018 the milk yield per lactation was reported at about 5500 kg for the traditional type and about 7000 kg for the modern type, with a butter-fat content of 5.5% and milk protein content of 3.5% for both types. A higher yield is reported elsewhere for the modern type in 2007–2008: 8385 kg, with 4.73% fat and 3.63% protein.
