= Original Braunvieh =

Breed of cattle

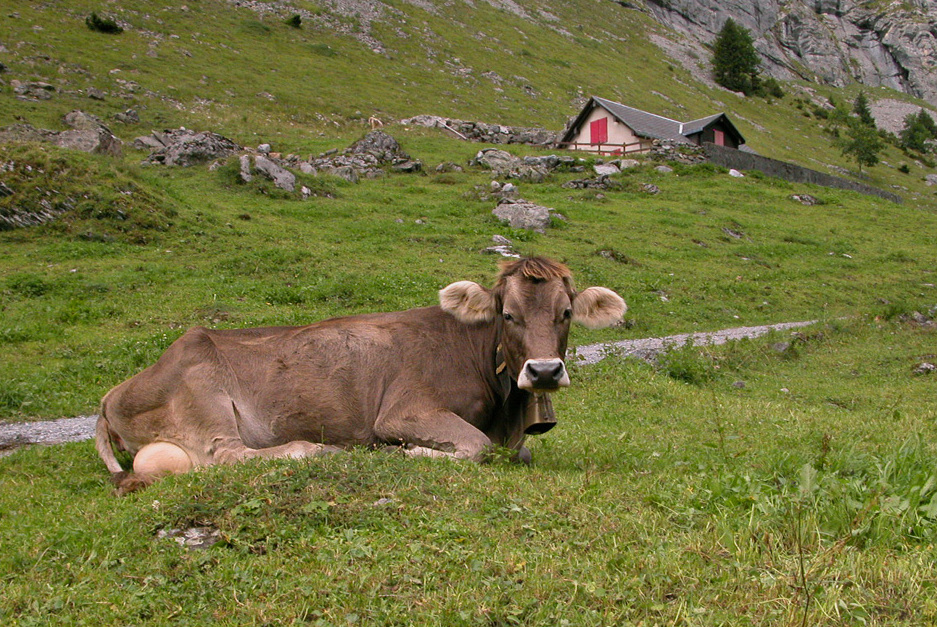
Original Braunvieh

The Original Braunvieh is a dual purpose dairy and beef cattle breed from the Switzerland. Braunvieh means "brown cow" and the animals are coloured grey to brown with white ears and muzzle and have horns. These cattle have been maintained as a pure breed, while the modern Braunvieh cattle have been crossed with Brown Swiss. They have contributed to the American Brown Swiss breed. In the 1980s breeding associations were formed in Germany and Austria to conserve the breed.

== Characteristics ==
Mature cows weigh approximately 700 kg (1,500 lb) and stand 135 to 145 cm (53 to 57 in) tall at the hips. Mature bulls weigh 1,000 to 1,100 kg (2,200 to 2,400 lb) and are 140 to 160 cm (55 to 63 in) tall at the hips.

The most fundamental differences between Original Braunvieh and Braunvieh are lower height, lower milk yield, larger muscles and the better beef performance.

== History ==
Monks at the Monastery of Einsiedeln bred the cattle for several centuries, keeping records showing the breeding principles and early Braunvieh breeding philosophy. The monks kept detailed records and diaries of their breeding principles. Braunvieh cattle exported from Switzerland to the United States between 1869 and 1880 were selected for milk production and formed the basis of the American Brown Swiss breed.
