= Braunvieh =

Swiss breed of cattle

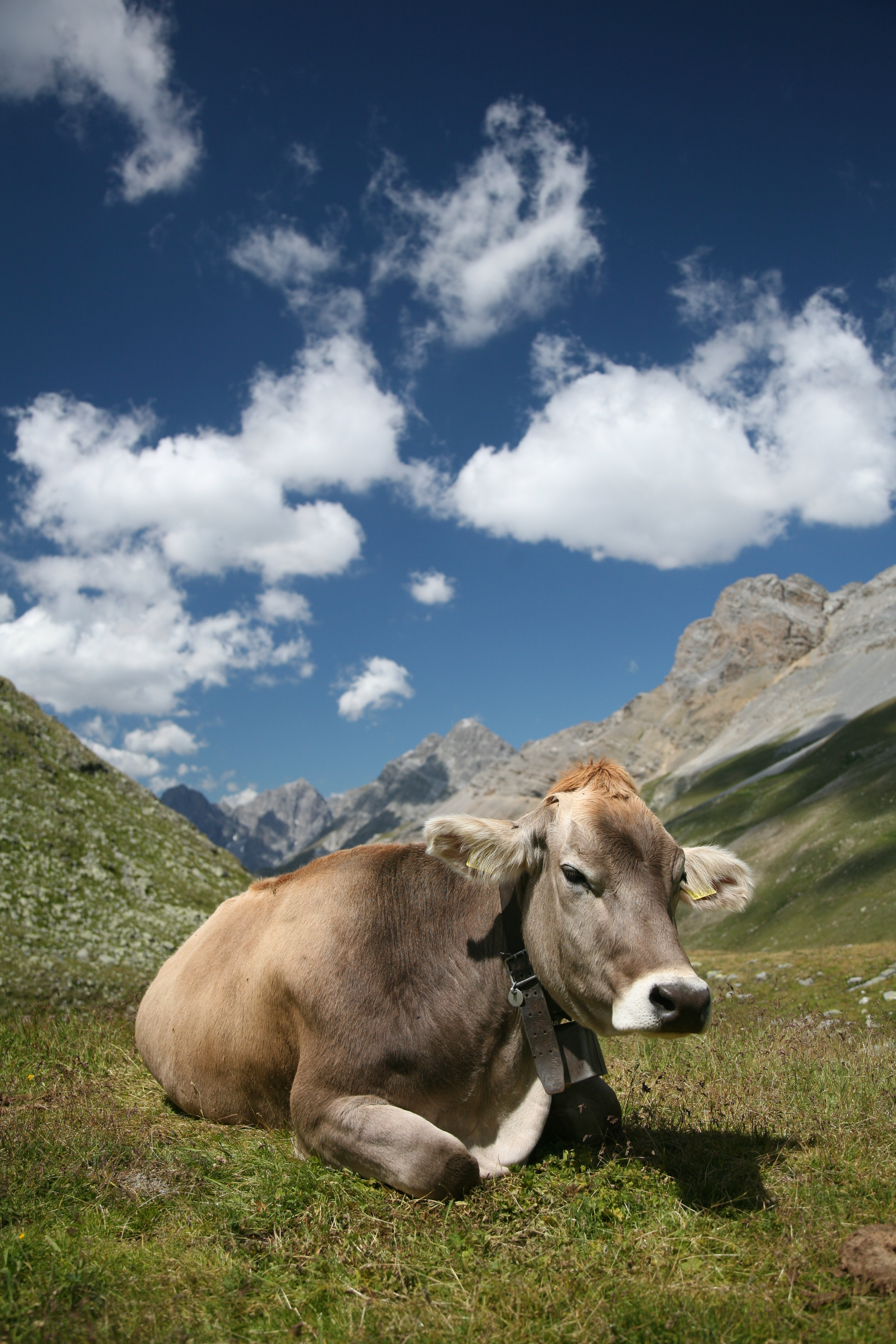
- Conservation status: FAO (2007): not at risk; DAD-IS (2025): not at risk
- Other names: Bruna Alpina; Bruna Italiana; Brune Suisse; Schweizerisches Braunvieh; Schwyz; Schwyzer; Swiss Brown
- Country of origin: Switzerland
- Use: dairy

Traits
- Weight: Male: average 1050 kg; Female: average 610 kg
- Height: Male: average 152 cm; Female: average 135 cm

Notes
- originally a triple-purpose breed, for milk, meat and draught

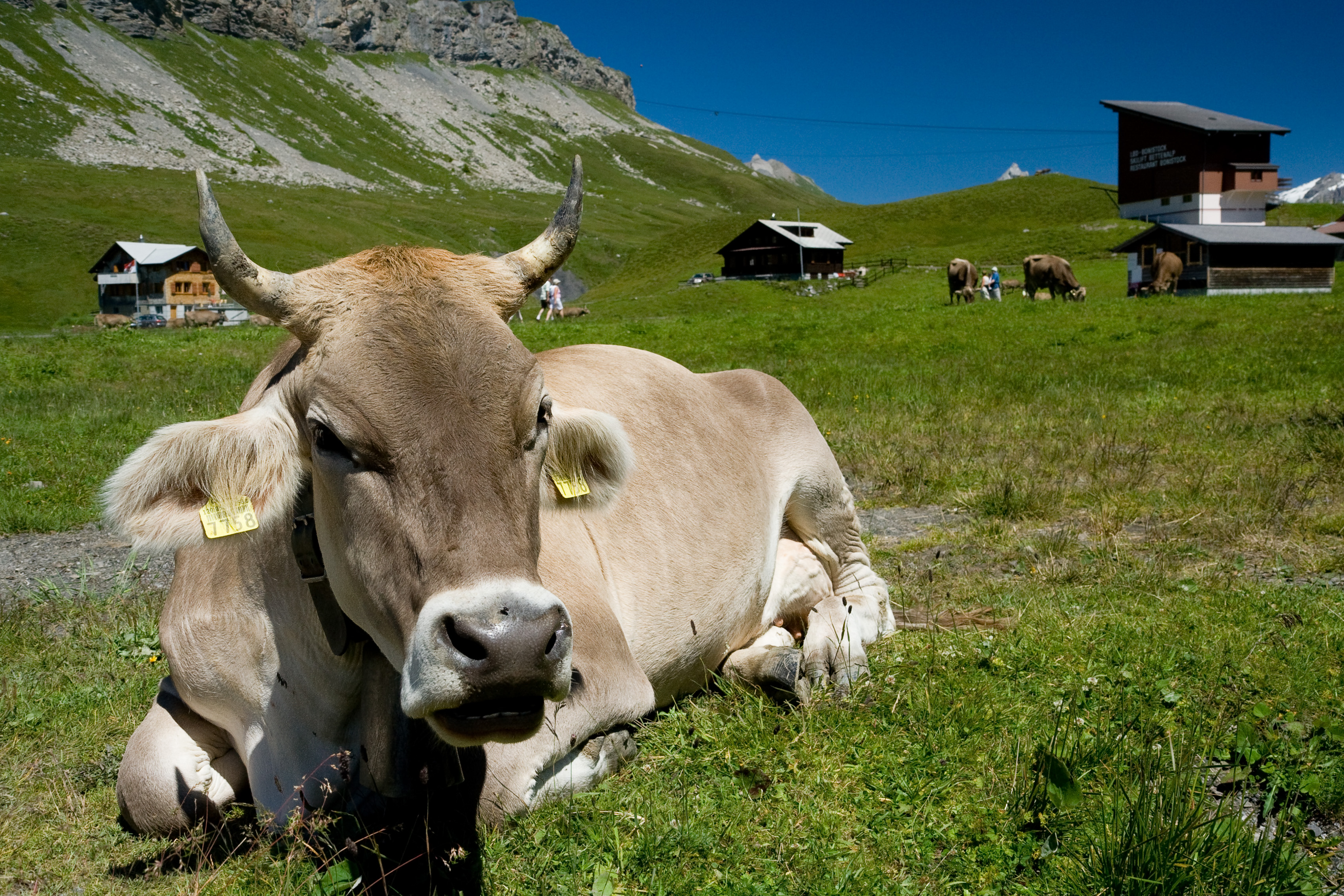
In Melchsee-Frutt, in the canton of Obwalden

The Braunvieh (Note: German pronunciation: [ˈbʁaʊnˌfiː], 'brown cattle') or Swiss Brown is a breed or group of breeds of domestic cattle originating in Switzerland and distributed throughout the Alpine region. It falls within the "Brown Mountain" group of cattle breeds. The Swiss Braunvieh was originally a triple-purpose animal, used for milk production, for meat and for draught work; the modern Braunvieh is predominantly a dairy breed.

In the latter part of the nineteenth century cattle of this type were exported to the United States, where they were selectively bred for dairy qualities only, and developed into a distinct breed, the American Brown Swiss. From about 1960 the Braunvieh was extensively cross-bred with these American cattle, such that over 75% of the genetic make-up of the Swiss Braunvieh is from the American breed. Small numbers of the original breed, unaffected by cross-breeding, are registered as Original Schweizer Braunvieh or Original Braunvieh.

== History ==
The Braunvieh derives from the grey-brown mountain cattle raised from mediaeval times in the Swiss canton of Schwyz in Central Switzerland. Documents from the late fourteenth century at the Monastery of Einsiedeln record the export of such cattle to Vorarlberg, now part of Austria. The first known herd-book for a cattle breed was that kept at the monastery for the Braunvieh from 1775 to 1782. A description from 1795 of Schwyzer cattle calls them the largest and finest of the country.

Cattle of this type were shown at the Exposition Universelle of 1855 in Paris, and at the International Exhibition of 1862 in London.

The Schwyz and two other breeds of Alpine brown cattle were recognised in 1875, and in 1879 the three were combined into a single-herd book with the name Schweizerische Braunvieh. In 1897 a breeders' association, the Verbands Schweizerischer Braunviehzucht-Genossenschaften, was founded in Bünzen, in the canton of Aargau.

Between 1967 and 1998 there was substantial cross-breeding with the American Brown Swiss with the aim of improving milk yield, physical size, and udder conformation. In Germany what began as a programme of improvement became in effect a programme of substitution; by 1994 the genetic contribution of the Brown Swiss to the Braunvieh had reached 60%.

=== The Original Braunvieh ===
In Switzerland some breeders had continued to breed the traditional type of dual-purpose Braunvieh, and this was formalised as the Schweizer Original Braunvieh in 1993. It is registered in the same herd book as the modern-type Braunvieh, but has different breeding aims. Efforts to preserve the original Braunvieh type had begun in Germany in 1988 with the formation of the Arbeitsgemeinschaft zur Erhaltung und Züchtung des Original Braunviehs im Allgäu. In Italy it is known as the Bruna Italiana Vecchio Ceppo or Bruna Originaria.

=== In other countries ===
The Braunvieh has given rise to several European cattle breeds in the Alpine region – in Austria, in Germany, in Italy and in Spain – as well as the Brown Swiss in the United States.

The Montafon of the southern Vorarlberg of Austria was of medium weight, muscular, usually brown with a pale dorsal stripe. In 1923 the name was changed to Voralberger Braunvieh.

The Bruna Alpina or Bruna Italiana is distributed throughout Italy. Braunvieh were imported from central Switzerland from the sixteenth century, and diffused from the Alpine valleys into the flat country of Lombardy and the Veneto – where they rapidly supplanted the mostly red-coated local breeds – and then further south as far as Calabria. In 1950 it was still the principal dairy breed of Italy, before the Frisona Italiana, the Italian Holstein-Friesian breed, achieved dominance. In Sardinia, Bruna bulls were used to cover local cows, leading to the creation of the tough and productive Sardo-Bruna.

Braunvieh exported to the United States from about 1870 were bred exclusively for milk production, and developed into the modern American Brown Swiss.

== Characteristics ==
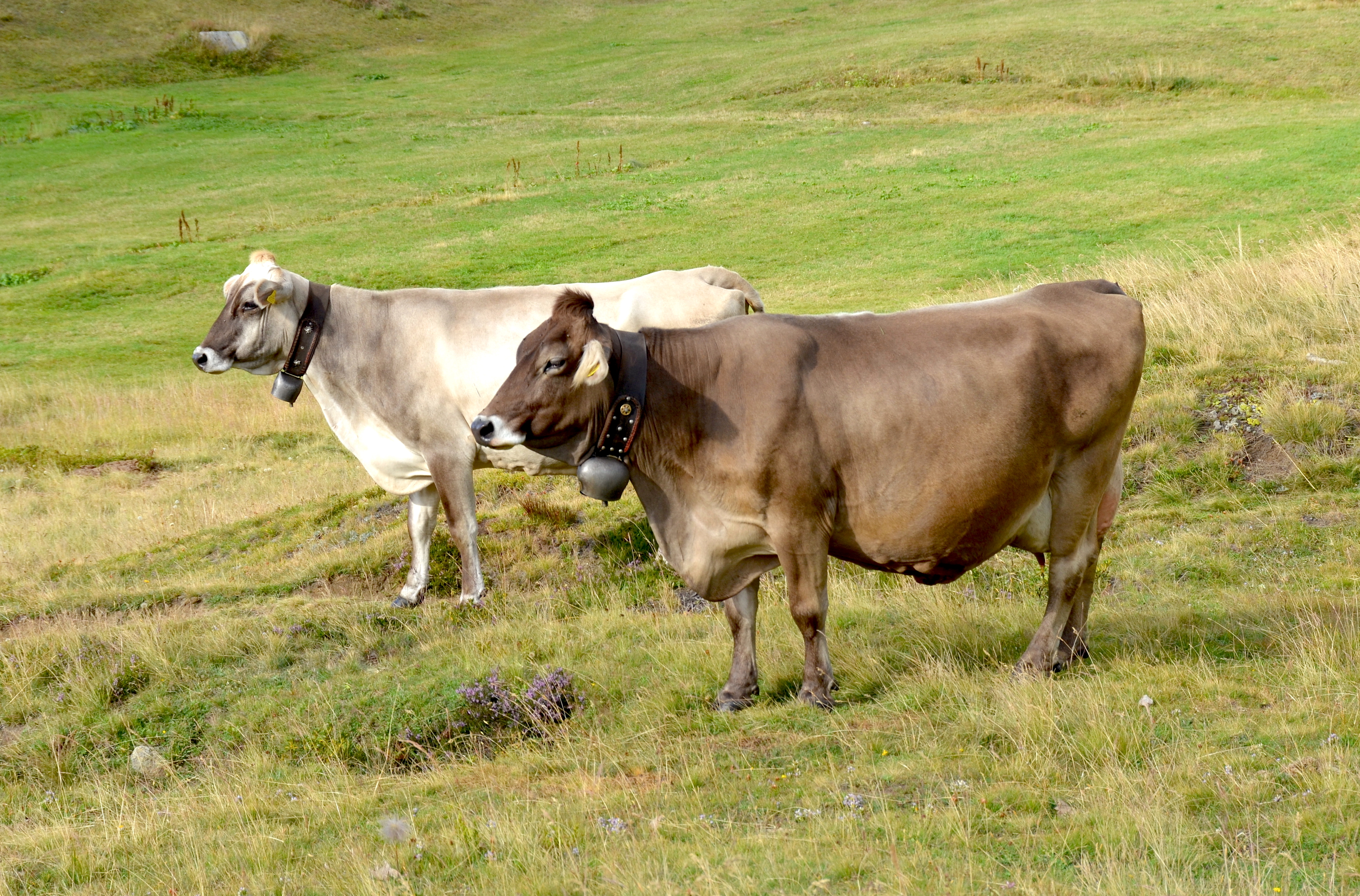
Brown and grey-brown cows at the Simplon Pass

The Braunvieh is a uniform brown or grey-brown in colour; the nose is black and encircled by a pale ring. The horns are pale with dark points. Cows weigh some 650–700 kg, with a height at the withers in the range 140–152 cm; bulls weigh on average 1050 kg, with an average height of 152 cm.

== Use ==
The modern Braunvieh is a dairy breed. The average milk yield is 6735 kg in a lactation of 300 days; the milk contains on average 3.97% milk-fat and 3.35% milk protein.
