= Harris Hill Farm =

Farmstead in New Milford, Connecticut, US

Coordinates: 41.594075°N 73.370156°W

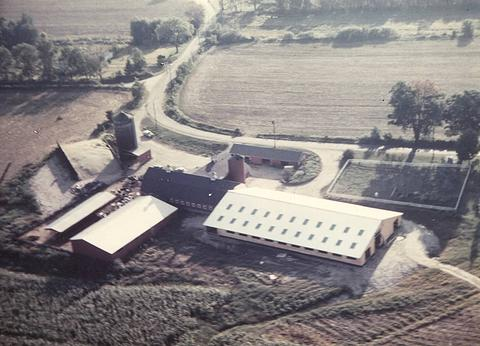

Harris Hill Farm is a family-owned farmstead in New Milford, Litchfield County, Connecticut. It began as a dairy farm on Prospect Street in Wethersfield. George W. Harris was among the first farmers to import a specific breed of Brown Swiss dairy cattle to the United States. He acquired his first Brown Swiss in 1882, and the farm made its first exhibition of the breed at the Charter Oak Fair in Hartford in 1883.

The farm was moved in 1957 by George G. and Vivian Harris to New Milford.

They farmed the land and ran a successful Brown Swiss cattle breeding program. Harris Hill Brown Swiss were shown and sold nationally and internationally. In 1981 George G. Harris started working for the National Brown Swiss Cattle Breeders Association at which time his future son-in-law took over the dairy operation. Harris Hill Farm was a working dairy farm until 1987. Upon George G's retirement, the Harris family started a pumpkin patch. George, Vivian, their children and grandchildren all contributed to the operation. Upon the death of George G and Vivian Harris, the next generation of The Harris Family (George O, Susan, and Janet) continues Harris Hill Farm. In 2012 the Harris Family sold the development rights to 79 acres (32 ha) of the farm to the Town of New Milford and State of Connecticut. Hay is produced by the family, a local farmer leases fields to grow feed corn, another local farmer leases pastures to raise sheep and The New Milford Youth Agency uses one field to raise garden vegetables for their summer program. The Harris Family continues to own and operate the Pick Your Own Pumpkin Patch each October.
