= Bovine progressive degenerative myeloencephalopathy =

Genetic disorder of cattle

Bovine progressive degenerative myeloencephalopathy (BPDME), also known as weaver syndrome, is a genetic disorder of cattle, characterized by hindlimb weakness and ataxia. It has been observed in male and female Brown Swiss cattle. It is known as weaver syndrome because of the animals' weaving gait while walking. BPDME is a genetic autosomal recessive disorder.

The signs of BPDME are first noticed in cattle aged 5–8 months, and include a weaving gait, along with weakness and lack of voluntary coordination of the muscles of the hind limbs (known as ataxia). Signs progressively worsen, and by 18–36 months of age, the animal is unable to rise. Affected animals are euthanized for welfare reasons.
