= Sunandini =

Breed of cattle

- Other names: Sunandini
- Country of origin: India
- Distribution: India
- Use: Dairy and meat (ground beef and roast beef)

Notes
- Used for dairy.

Sunandini is a composite breed of cattle developed in India by crossing undistinguished cattle with Brown Swiss, Jersey cattle and Holstein Friesian cattle. Jersey and HF bulls from many parts of the world are extensively utilized to generate this breed.
