= Dry cow =

Dairy cow lactation stage

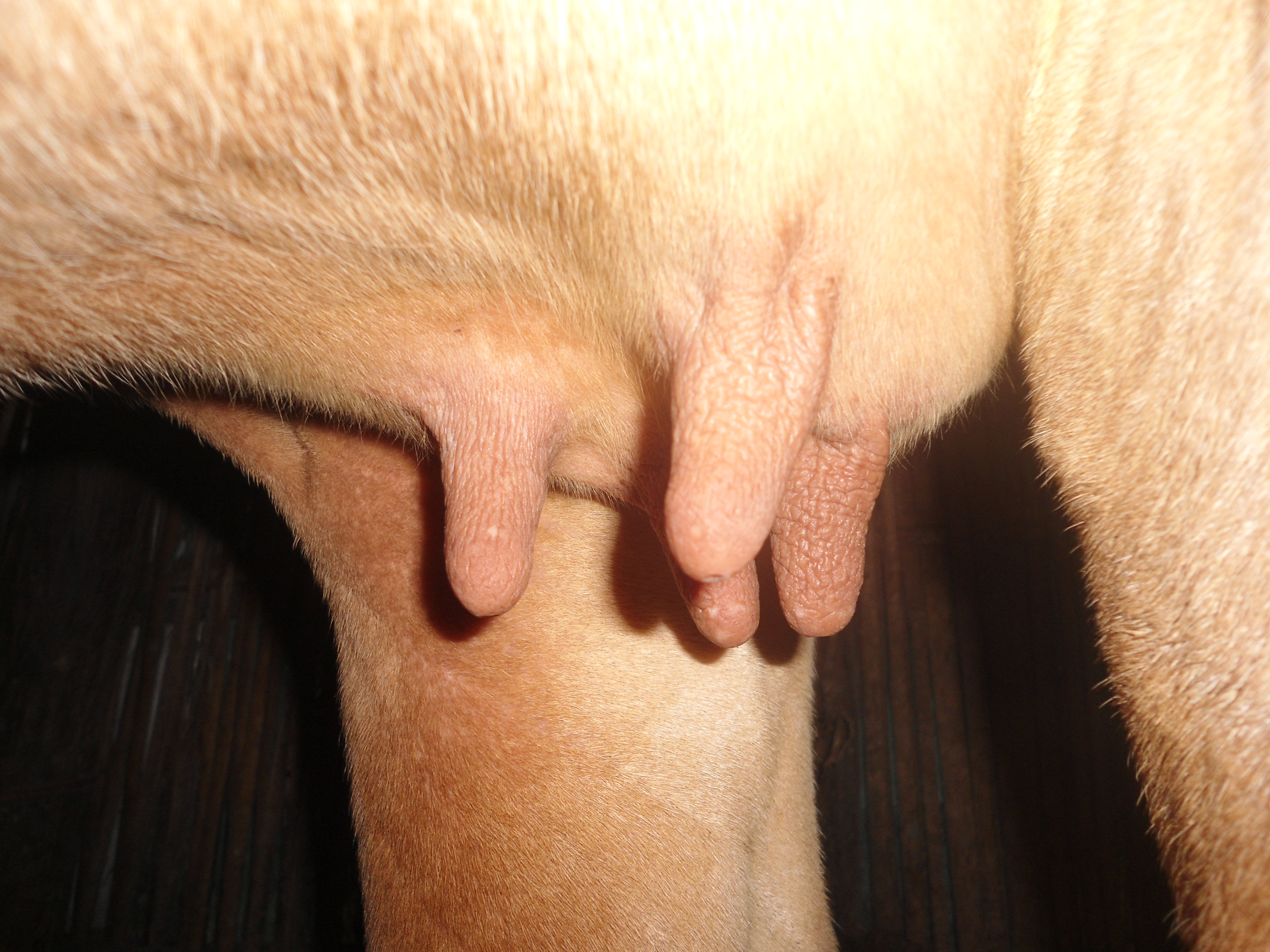
The cows teat is a projection of the mammary gland that is sealed during their dry period.

A dry cow refers to a dairy cow that is in a stage of her lactation cycle where milk production ceases prior to calving. This part of her lactation cycle is referred to as the cow's dry period and typically last between 40 and 65 days. Dry cows are typically divided into two groups: far-off (60–21 days before calving) and close-up (21 days to calving). Once the cow has entered this stage, producers will seal the cow's teat while following a veterinarian-recommended dry cow therapy for their herd. This dry period is a critical part of her lactation cycle and is important for the cow's health, the newborn calf, and future milk production, as it allows the cow time to rest, eat, and prepare for birth. During this time, the cow will produce colostrum for the newly born calf.

Research has shown that this period impacts overall milk production yields during cows' next lactations. Dry periods that are too short have been associated with reduced milk yields and increased risk of infection. Dry periods that are too long have also been linked to an overall decrease in lifetime milk yields but could also lead to over-conditioning, metabolic diseases, and infections. During this time the cow is highly susceptible to intra-mammary infections due to the anatomical and functional changes occurring within the mammary gland. Proper individualized treatments and management must be implemented for optimal health and production as well as disease prevention.

== Physiology ==
During the dry period, changes begin to occur within the mammary gland which correspond to milk synthesis and secretion. This period is important for the rejuvenation of new udder tissue in preparation for lactation. It also provides the cow the opportunity to eliminate mastitis-causing pathogens within the udder.

In the early stages of the non-lactating period (between 12 and 24 hours) there is decrease of milk protein and cell survival genes, resulting in a loss of epithelial cells. The change in intracellular processes and gene regulation causes a decrease in milk production until all milk production from mammary epithelial cells cease. Concentrations of milk-specific components such as lactose and fat will also decrease as milk production decreases. This stage is followed by a steady state period where the mammary glands remain in a non-lactating state. Preceding parturition, parenchymal tissue within the mammary gland will redevelop, allowing the reconstruction of new udder tissue in preparation for lactation. This step is important for optimal milk production in dairy cows which undergo consecutive lactations. Nutrient- and antibody-rich milk, colostrum, will also be produced during the end of this phase.

== Drying off protocol ==
Proper hygiene and sterilization techniques are essential when the cow is dried off. Veterinarians will often recommend an appropriate drying off protocol and therapy, which can help prevent common infections such as E.coli, Streptococcus spp and mastitis. Cows that are being dried off are often identified and marked to differentiate them from other cows in the herd that are still being milked. During the drying off procedure, gloves are worn and should be changed in between drying off each cow. Once the cow's teat is wiped clean and disinfected, a teat sealant will be applied to stop milk production. Teat sealants may be internally or externally administered depending on the chosen protocol. Antibiotics are commonly used within treatments, which will be inserted into the teat before the sealant is applied. Once these treatments are administered, a post-milking teat dip or spray may be applied. The cow should also remain in a clean area for at least 30 minutes, and avoid walking long distances after drying-off. Once the cow is dried off, it is important to monitor the cow's udder condition to check for inflammation and signs of infection.

== Management ==
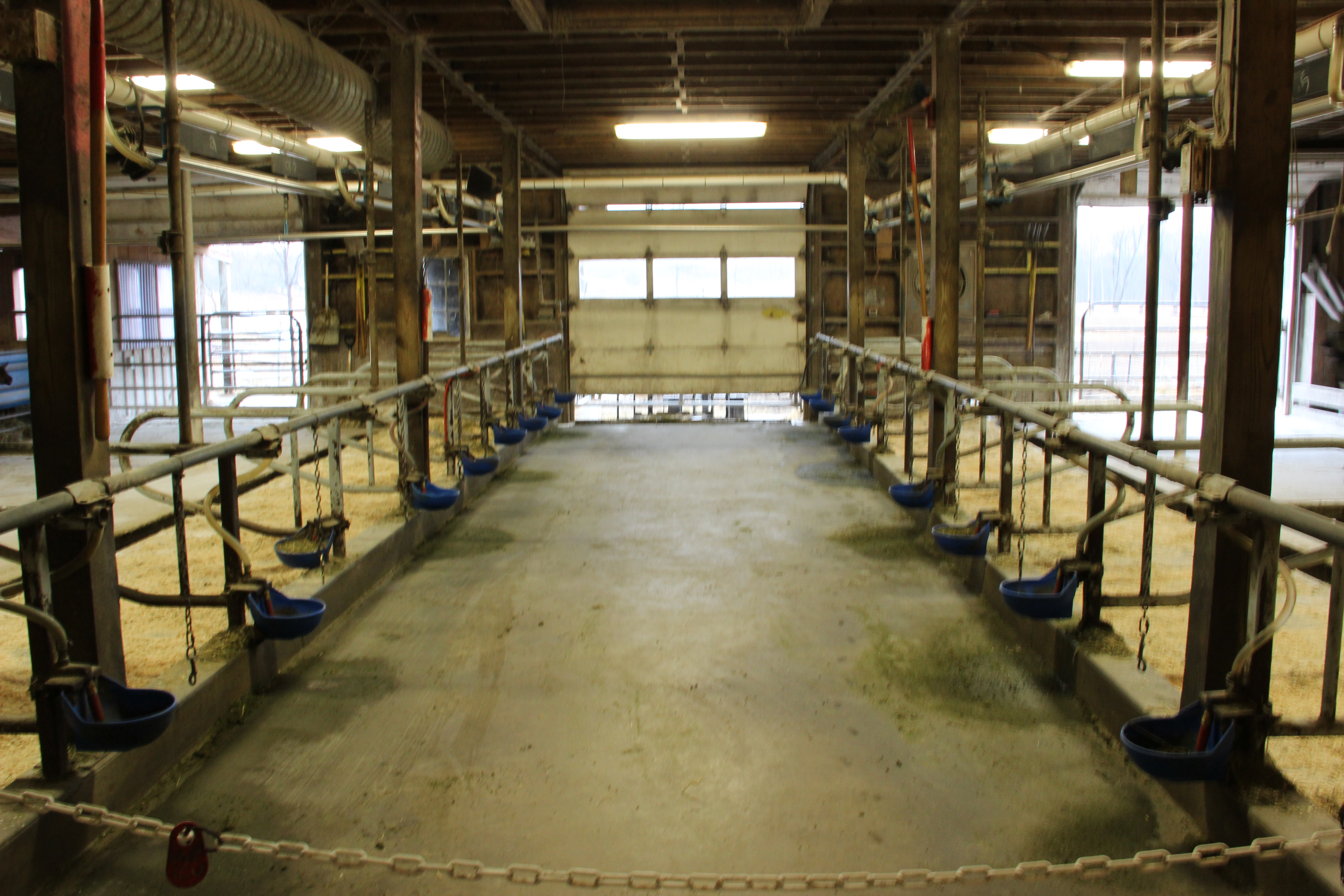
Clean stalls help to prevent infection by reducing microbial load and exposure.

Implementing adequate management during the dry period is crucial for optimal health and production. Microbial exposure, udder defence mechanisms and environmental factors must all be considered to prevent and control infection rates and incidences. Microbial exposure can be reduced through proper hygiene, such as clean housing and environmental sanitation. Scraping manure from stalls so that the lying area is dry also helps to reduce bacterial load and exposure. Cows kept at pasture are at a higher risk of infection risk due to pathogen exposure and ranging environmental conditions.

Teat sealants, antibiotics and vaccinations are all considered udder defence mechanisms used to prevent infections. These products would be included within the selected dry cow therapy. Long acting antibiotics used during this time work to treat any existing intra-mammary infections while also providing preventing new infections. Minimizing stress is important during the dry period as it can negatively impact appetite and immunity. Social stress can be reduced by avoiding large pen or herd changes, so the social hierarchy is not disrupted. Some producers may choose to completely separate dry cows from the rest of the herd to ensure they are not milked. Environmental conditions such as ventilation and temperature should be considered. Managing heat stress can be implemented through the use of shade and water sprinklers. Research has shown that heat stress during this period can compromise the immune system, reduce mammary tissue development and reduce milk production following lactation.

== Nutrition ==
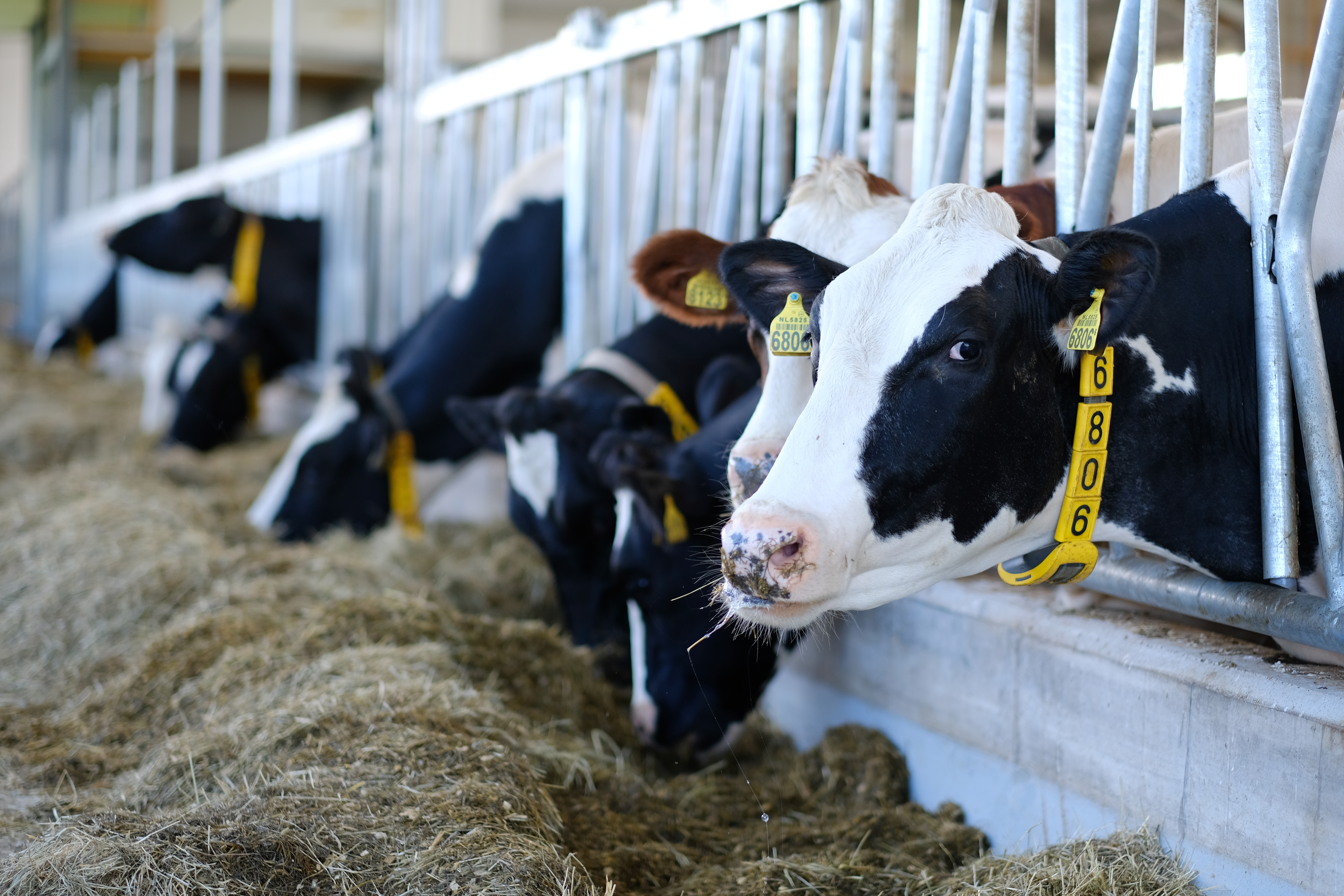
Dry cows require specific nutrient levels during their dry period.

Dairy cows have specific nutritional needs during the dry phase. Separate diets are required for far-off and close-up cows in response to their metabolic changes as cows prepare for parturition. Producers may consult a nutritional advisor to ensure cows are receiving proper nutrients during this time. A far off cows diet should contain less energy and a high fiber content, while close up cows require a more energy dense diet. Forages such as corn and grain products may be incorporated within a close up cows diet because of their lower potassium content. Close-up cows may also require these lower potassium levels to prevent milk fever. It is also important for both dry cows to obtain enough protein within their diet for optimal health, milk production and reproduction. Research shows that milk production may be negatively impacted if cows do not acquire enough protein during their dry phase. If farms are unable to provide separate diets for far-off and close-up cows, producers may choose to manage their diets with a shorter dry period and a negative DCAD (dietary cation-anion difference) ration diet. These diets are acidic and help calcium be reabsorbed within the cows body and reduce the risk of milk fever.
