= Sardo Bruna =

Breed of cattle

- Country of origin: Italy: Sardinia
- Use: Beef

Traits
- Coat: Mouse grey
- Horn status: Horned

The Sardo Bruna is a breed of beef cattle from the Italian island of Sardinia. It is one of the 16 minor Italian cattle breeds of limited diffusion recognised and protected by the Ministero delle Politiche Agricole Alimentari e Forestali, the Italian ministry of agriculture.
