= Brown Swiss cattle =

American breed of dairy cattle

Brown Swiss
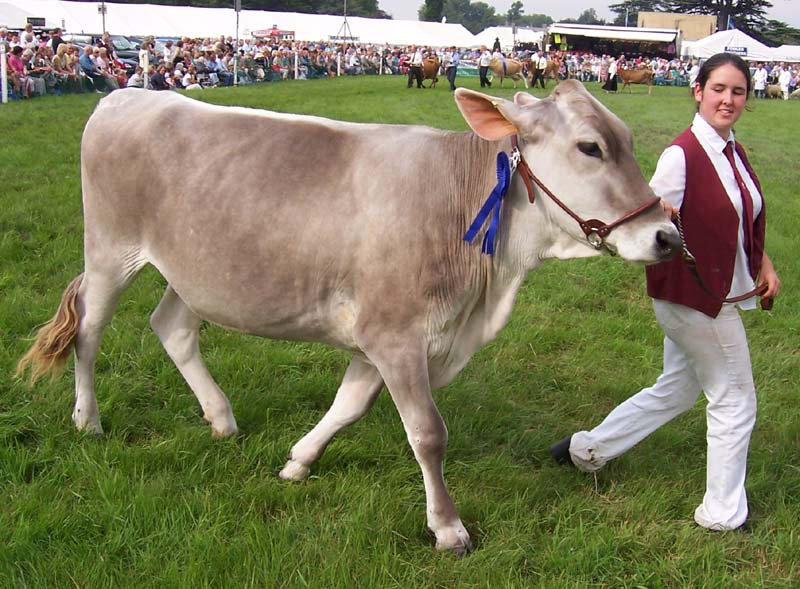
- Heifer
- Conservation status: FAO (2007): not at risk
- Other names: American Brown Swiss
- Country of origin: United States
- Distribution: world-wide
- Use: dairy; cross-breeding

Traits
- Weight: Male: 900 kg; Female: 590–640 kg
- Coat: usually pale brown
- Cattle; Bos (primigenius) taurus

The Brown Swiss or American Brown Swiss is an American breed of dairy cattle. It derives from the traditional triple-purpose Braunvieh ("Swiss Brown") of the Alpine region of Europe, but has diverged substantially from it. It was selectively bred for dairy qualities only, and its draft and beef capabilities were lost. Milk yield was measured in 2013 at 10231 kg (22600 lb) per year; the milk has about 4% butterfat and 3.5% protein and is suitable for making cheese.

In the twentieth century the Brown Swiss became a world breed, with a global population estimated in 1990 at seven million head. It has been much used for cross-breeding and has influenced a number of modern breeds.

In English "Swiss Brown" refers to the original Braunvieh breed, as opposed to "Brown Swiss" for the American breed.

== History ==
The Braunvieh is a traditional breed of triple-purpose cattle from the Alpine region, particularly Switzerland; it was reared as a draft beast, for its milk and for its meat. The Braunvieh was first imported to the United States in 1869, when seven cows and a bull were shipped to one Henry M. Clark in Belmont, Massachusetts. Between then and 1906, when cattle imports to the United States were banned because of fear of disease, many more were imported, sometimes by immigrants arriving from Europe. The American Brown Swiss descends from a total of 167 imported parent animals. A breed society, the Brown Swiss Cattle Breeders' Association, was formed in 1880; the first herd-book dates from 1889. By the end of the century breeding was directed towards dairy qualities; a production register for cows was opened in 1911. From about 1940 the breed became more diffused across the United States. In the mid-twentieth century, intensive selective breeding for dairy characteristics and excessive inbreeding led to a loss of genetic diversity, and also to an increase in transmissible genetic defects such as the recessive factors for bovine progressive degenerative myeloencephalopathy ("weaver disease") and spinal muscular atrophy, both of which have a high percentage of carriers in the Brown Swiss (2.6% and 9.2% respectively).

The Brown Swiss was exported – either on the hoof or in the form of embryos or semen – to many countries of the world. It has been much used for cross-breeding, notably with many of the original Alpine breeds of brown cattle in Austria, Germany and Switzerland. In 1990 the global population was estimated to be approximately seven million head.

== Characteristics ==
The American Brown Swiss is of medium size. The coat is usually a light grayish brown, but varies from almost white to gray or dark brown. There may be some shading in the coat, with the forequarters often darker than the legs and hind parts. The muzzle is black, ringed with creamy white.

== Use ==
An average milk yield of 10231 kg per cow in a lactation of 305 days was reported in 2013; the milk-fat content was 4.03%. The milk has been found to have a slightly higher proportion of long-chain fatty acids than that of Holstein-Friesian cows, but no substantial difference in calcium content. It is considered to be suitable for cheese-making.
