= Coated urea =

Coated urea fertilizers are a group of controlled release fertilizers consisting of prills of urea coated in less-soluble chemicals such as sulfur, polymers, other products or a combination. These fertilizers mitigate some of the negative aspects of urea fertilization, such as fertilizer burn. The coatings release the urea either when penetrated by water, as with sulfur, or when broken down, as with polymers.

== Overview ==
Urea is widely used as a nitrogen fertilizer. Its high solubility in water makes it useful for liquid application, and it has a much lower risk of causing fertilizer burn than other chemicals such as calcium cyanide or ammonium nitrate. However, the risk of fertilizer burn with urea can be unacceptably high in some situations, such as higher temperatures. The high water-solubility of urea can be disadvantageous in some cases as well.

One particular technique to mitigate these disadvantages has been to encapsulate prills of urea with less-soluble chemicals. These coatings permit the gradual release of urea in a controlled fashion, allowing for less-frequent applications.

== Sulfur-coated urea ==
Sulfur-coated urea, or SCU, fertilizers release nitrogen via water penetration through cracks and micropores in the coating. Once water penetrates through the coating, nitrogen release is rapid. The particles of fertilizer may in turn be sealed with wax to slow release further still, making microbial degradation necessary to permit water penetration. The size of fertilizer particles may also be varied in order to vary the time at which nitrogen release occurs. Sulfur-coated products typically range from 32% to 41% elemental nitrogen by weight. The sulfur coating process was originally developed by the Tennessee Valley Authority.

Sulfur-coated urea products can only be applied in granular form, and thus cannot be applied via liquid fertilization methods. It is not uncommon to find empty sulfur husks in turf once the nitrogen is released. Another disadvantage has to do with the relatively large particle size of sulfur-coated urea fertilizers, which makes their use on closely mown surfaces like putting greens impractical. However, more recently, materials with smaller particle sizes have been developed, permitting the use of sulfur-coated ureas on putting greens.

== Polymer-coated urea ==
Polymer-coated urea, also called plastic-coated urea, or PCU, fertilizers can permit a more precise rate of nitrogen release than sulfur-coated urea products. It's possible to produce polymer-coated products where the nitrogen release can be delayed for 10 months after application. The primary disadvantage of polymer-coated urea products is their relatively high cost compared to sulfur-coated urea.

== Combination products ==
Products that use a combination of sulfur-coating and polymer-coating also exist. Typically, these products consist of urea, coated with a layer of sulfur, which is in turn coated with a layer of polymer. Each coating layer is generally less than the normal thickness for the individual processes. These products are generally used as less-expensive alternatives to purely plastic-coated products, while still providing precise nitrogen release characteristics.

== See also ==
- Labeling of fertilizer
- Turf management
- Urea-formaldehyde
