= Diurea =

A diurea is an organic compound containing two urea units. This may refer to:

- Methylene diurea
- Ethylene diurea
- Isobutylidenediurea
- Crotonylidene diurea
- Glycoluril ((HC)_{2}(HNC(O)NH)_{2})
