= Ammonium phosphate (compound) =

Ammonium phosphate refers to three different chemical compounds, all of which are formed by the reaction of ammonia with phosphoric acid and have the general formula [NH_{4}]_{x}[H_{3−x}PO_{4}], where 1 ≤ x ≤ 3:

- Ammonium dihydrogenphosphate, [NH_{4}][H_{2}PO_{4}]
- Diammonium phosphate, [NH_{4}]_{2}[HPO_{4}]
- Ammonium phosphate, [NH_{4}]_{3}[PO_{4}]
