= Ureas =

Class of organic compound

Biotin, a water-soluble B vitamin, is a bicyclic urea.

In chemistry, ureas are a class of organic compounds with the formula (R_{2}N)_{2}CO where R = H, alkyl, aryl, etc. Thus, in addition to describing the specific chemical compound urea ((H_{2}N)_{2}CO), urea is the name of a functional group that is found in many compounds and materials of both practical and theoretical interest. Generally ureas are colorless crystalline solids, which, owing to the presence of fewer hydrogen bonds, exhibit melting points lower than that of urea itself.

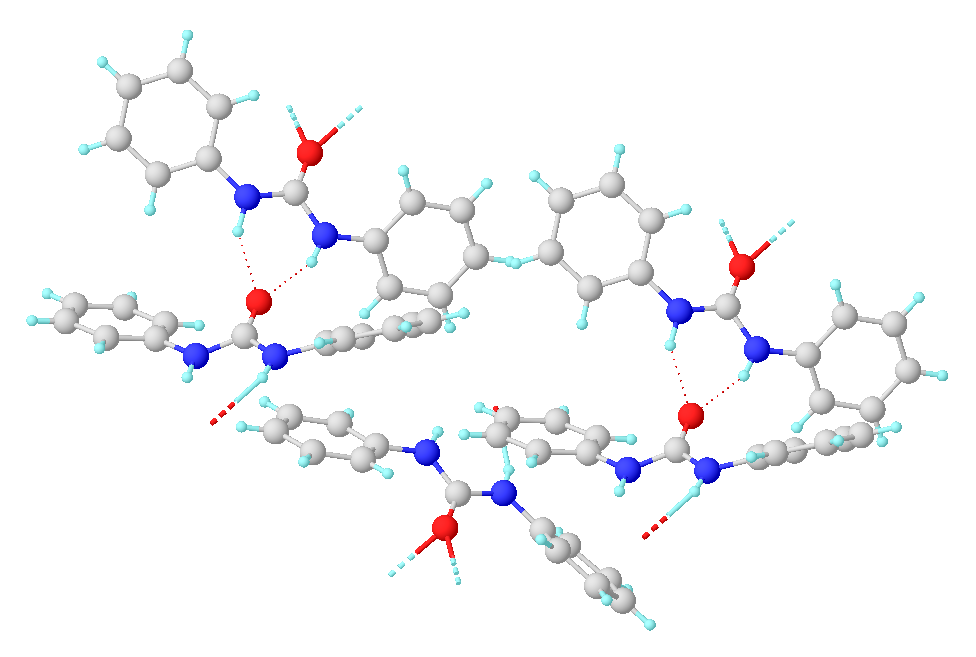
Structure of N,N'-diphenylurea showing intermolecular hydrogen bonding.

== Synthesis ==
Ureas can be prepared many methods, but rarely by direct carbonation, which is the route to urea itself. Instead, methods can be classified according those that assemble the urea functionality and those that start with preformed urea.

=== Assembly of N-substituted urea functionality ===
Phosgenation entails the reaction of amines with phosgene, proceeding via the isocyanate (or carbamoyl chloride) as an intermediate:

COCl_{2} + R_{2}NH → R_{2}NC(O)Cl + HCl
COCl_{2} + RNH_{2} → RNCO + 2 HCl

Overall reaction:

COCl_{2} + 2 R_{2}NH → (R_{2}N)_{2}CO + 2 HCl

Tetramethylurea is prepared in this way and in general secondary amines give reliable results. Reactions using primary amines must be carefully controlled as the isocyanate intermediate can react with the urea to form a biuret:

R_{2}NC(O)N(H)R' + R"NCO → R_{2}NC(O)NR'C(O)NHR"

Unsymmetrical ureas are generated by condensation of isocyanates with amines:

RNCO + R'_{2}NH → (R'_{2}N)(R(H)N)CO

Analogously, unsymmetrical primary ureas are generated by condensation of ammonium salts and alkali metal cyanates:

Na^{+}NCO^{−} + [R_{2}NH_{2}]Cl → (R’_{2}N)(H_{2}N)CO + NaCl

The artificial sweetener dulcin is produced by the condensation of ethoxyaniline with potassium cyanate. Si(NCO)_{4} is also used as a precursor to such unsymmetrical ureas.

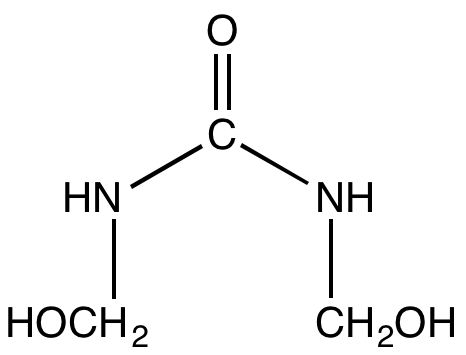
bis(hydroxymethyl)urea and related compounds are additives for permanent press clothing.

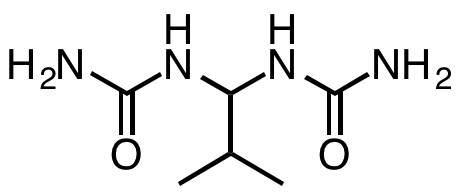
Isobutylidenediurea.

The very high toxicities of compounds such as phosgene and isocyanates makes them unappealing to work with and there has been a drive towards safer reagents. These have traditionally been more expensive and hence mostly been limited to laboratory-scale work.

=== From urea ===
Urea undergoes transamidation with alkyl and aryl amines:

(H_{2}N)_{2}CO + R_{2}NH → (R_{2}N)(H_{2}N)CO + NH_{3}
(R_{2}N)(H_{2}N)CO + R_{2}NH → (R_{2}N)_{2}CO + NH_{3}

These reactions are used to prepare cyclic ureas. Monomethylurea, precursor to theobromine, is produced from methylamine and urea. Phenylurea is produced similarly but from anilinium chloride:

(H_{2}N)_{2}CO + [R_{2}NH_{2}]Cl → (R_{2}N)(H_{2}N)CO + NH_{4}Cl

Ureas containing N-H bonds, including urea itself, are readily alkylated by aldehydes. The products are α-hydroxyalkylureas. Formaldehyde gives the bis(hydroxymethyl)urea, an intermediate in the formation of urea-formaldehyde resins. Cyclic ureas result from glyoxal ((CHO)_{2}):

(H_{2}N)_{2}CO + (CHO)_{2} → (CH(OH)NH)_{2}CO

Two equivalents of urea condense with isobutyraldehyde giving the alkylidene derivative:

2(H_{2}N)_{2}CO + OC(H)CHMe_{2} → [(H_{2}N)C(O)NH]_{2}CHCHMe_{2} + H_{2}O

This derivative, isobutylidenediurea, is used as a slow-release fertilizer because in the soil it slowly hydrolyzes, reverting to urea, an excellent source of fixed nitrogen.

Benzimidazolinone "tape" derived from benzimidazolinones.
