= Glycoluril =

Names
- IUPAC name Tetrahydroimidazo[4,5-d]imidazole-2,5(1H,3H)-dione
- Other names Acetylenediurea; Acetyleneurea; Acetylenediureine; Acetylene carbamide; Glyoxalbiuret; Glyoxaldiureine; Glyoxaldiurene

Identifiers
CAS Number	496–46–8
3D model (JSmol)	Interactive image
ChemSpider	56138
ECHA InfoCard	100.007.111
PubChem CID	62347
UNII	U9H2W4OS13
CompTox Dashboard (EPA)	DTXSID6031380
- InChI: InChI=1S/C4H6N4O2/c9-3-5-1-2(7-3)8-4(10)6-1/h1-2H,(H2,5,7,9)(H2,6,8,10) Key: VPVSTMAPERLKKM-UHFFFAOYSA-N; InChI=1/C4H6N4O2/c9-3-5-1-2(7-3)8-4(10)6-1/h1-2H,(H2,5,7,9)(H2,6,8,10) Key: VPVSTMAPERLKKM-UHFFFAOYAG
- SMILES: C12C(NC(=O)N1)NC(=O)N2

Properties
Chemical formula	C_{4}H_{6}N_{4}O_{2}
Molar mass	142.118 g·mol^{−1}
- Except where otherwise noted, data are given for materials in their standard state (at 25 °C [77 °F], 100 kPa). Infobox references

Glycoluril is an organic compound with the formula (HC)_{2}(HNC(O)NH)_{2}. It is classified as diurea, consisting of two cyclic urea groups sharing a two-carbon linker. It is a white powder that has been extensively examined as a precursor to macrocyclic compounds and as a precursor to amino resins used in paints and coatings. Many other applications have been considered.

== Production ==
Glycoluril can be synthesized by the reaction two equivalents of urea with glyoxal. The reaction is catalyzed by sulfuric acid:

2 OC(NH_{2})_{2} + (CHO)_{2} → (HC)_{2}(HNC(O)NH)_{2} + 2 H_{2}O

Likewise, using other vicinal carbonyl (or carbonyl hydrate) reactants give derivatives having various functional groups in place of the hydrogen atoms on the carbon chain.

== Reactions ==
The four amide-like hydrogen atoms of glycoluril undergo a variety of reactions. Substitution with halogen atoms gives the tetrachloride and tetrabromide:

(HC)_{2}(HNC(O)NH)_{2} + 4 Cl_{2} → (HC)_{2}(ClNC(O)NCl)_{2} + 4 HCl

Tetrachloromoglycoluril and tetrabromoglycoluril are halogenating agents and potential disinfectants.

Condensation reactions with aldehydes results initially in hydroxyalkylation, but is often pushed to give macrocycles or polymers. One large family of rings are formed from formaldehyde:

(HC)_{2}(HNC(O)NH)_{2} + 4 CH_{2}O → (HC)_{2}(HOCH_{2}NC(O)NHCH_{2}OH)_{2}

This tetramethylol glycoluril has use as a biocide in water-based paints, in liquid detergents and in care and cleaning agents (in concentrations of 0.1%). It also finds utility as a crosslinker for hydroxyl-containing polymers, as an industrial fungicide and as an accelerator in cements.

6 (HC)_{2}(HOCH_{2}NC(O)NHCH_{2}OH)_{2} → [(HC)_{2}(CH_{2}NC(O)NHCH_{2})_{2}]_{6}

These cucurbituril-like chains, rings, and polymers serve as hosts to bind to various neutral and cationic species.

== Use ==
Glycoluril has been assessed as a controlled-release fertilizer, but the economic factors are not favorable.

Tetraacetylglycoluril (TAGU) can be prepared from glycoluril by reaction with acetic anhydride. Tetraacetylglycoluril can be used, but it not very common as a bleach activator for sodium percarbonate in solid detergent formulations because of its slow biodegradability.

The reaction with nitrating acid (concentrated nitric acid and concentrated sulfuric acid) leads to the explosives dinitroglycoluril and tetranitroglycoluril.
