= Bacterial leaf scorch =

Bacterial disease of plants

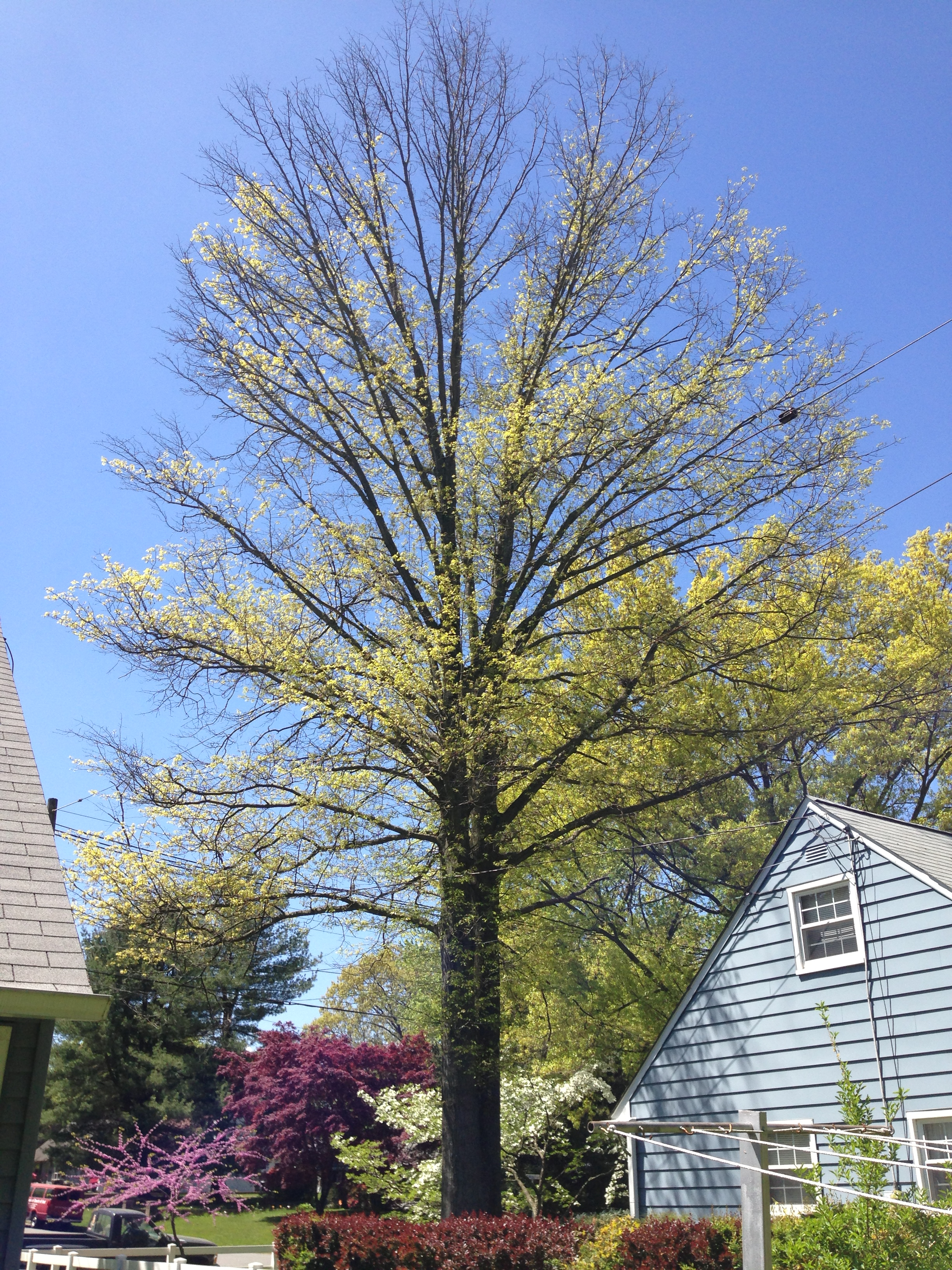
- Large pin oak (Quercus palustris) stricken with bacterial leaf scorch during leaf-out
- Common names: BLS
- Causal agents: Xylella fastidiosa
- Hosts: trees and crops
- Vectors: leafhoppers

Bacterial leaf scorch (BLS), or bacterial leaf spot, is a disease state affecting many crops, caused mainly by the xylem-plugging bacterium Xylella fastidiosa. It can be mistaken for ordinary leaf scorch caused by cultural practices such as over-fertilization.

== Hosts ==
BLS can be found on a wide variety of hosts, ranging from ornamental trees (elm, maple, oak) and shrubs, to crop species including blueberry and almond.

- Xylella fastidiosa is known to cause BLS in a very wide range of plants. Each of its subspecies has a different host range.
  - The multiplex subspecies causes BLS of pecans.
- Bacterial spot of peppers and tomatoes is caused by the bacteria Xanthomonas campestris pv. vesicatoria, which has since been divided into four pathovars in three species.
- Bacterial spot of peaches is caused by the bacteria Xanthomonas arboricola pv. pruni. It also infects almonds. Spots may form on the leaves and they can be mistaken for peach scab, which is caused by a fungus.

== Symptoms ==
An irregular browning leaf margin which may or may not be bordered by a pale halo.

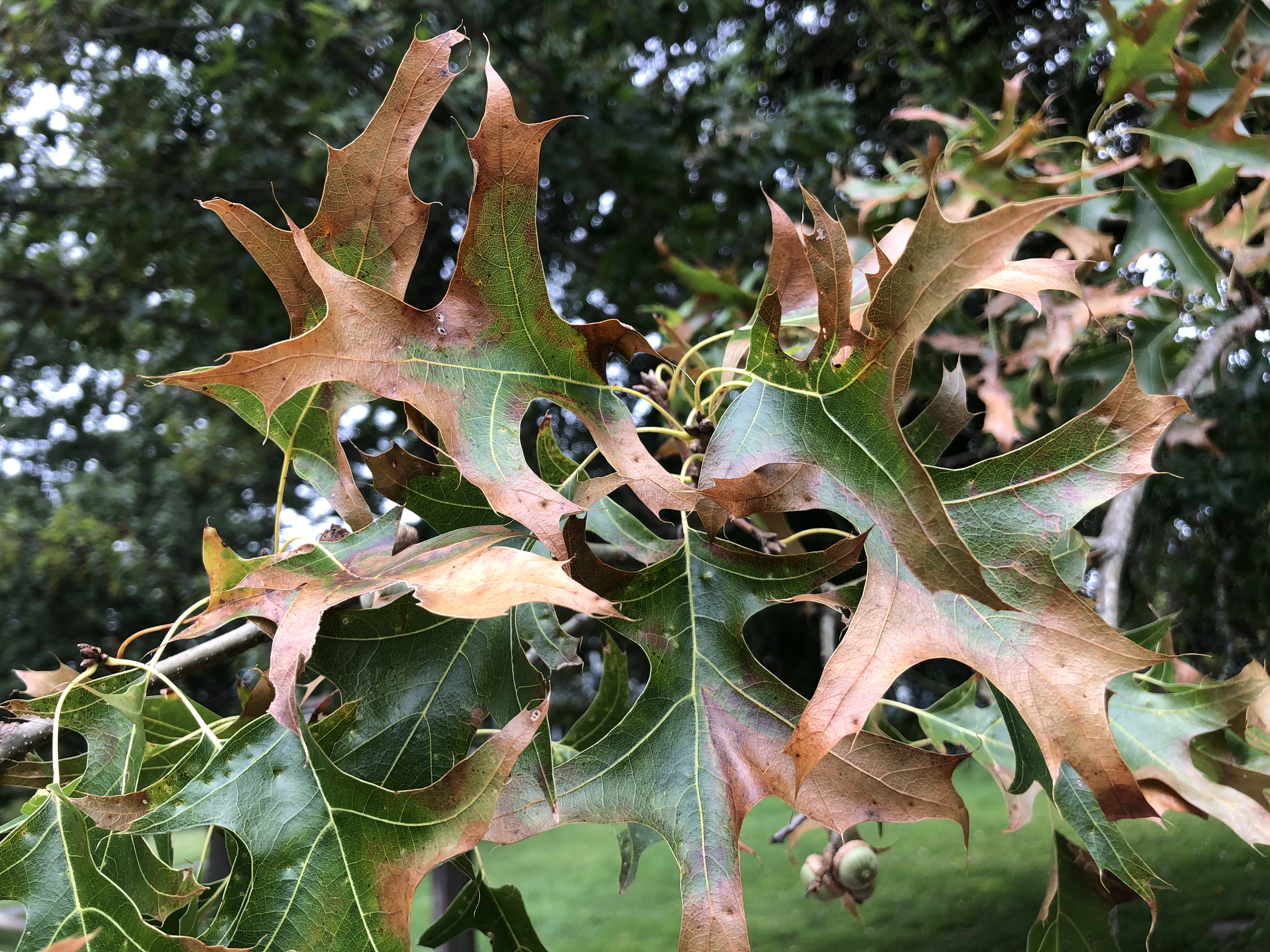
Pin oak leaves with symptoms of bacterial leaf scorch

Symptoms re-occur every year, spreading throughout the tree crown, eventually killing the host plant.

== Vectors ==
Xylem-feeding leafhoppers can transmit the disease bacteria. In general, any xylem-feeding insect can transmit the disease.

== Treatment ==
There are no known effective treatments for BLS, consequently, removal of affected plants is recommended.

== See also ==
- Fertilizer burn
- Leaf scorch
