= Tripotassium phosphate =

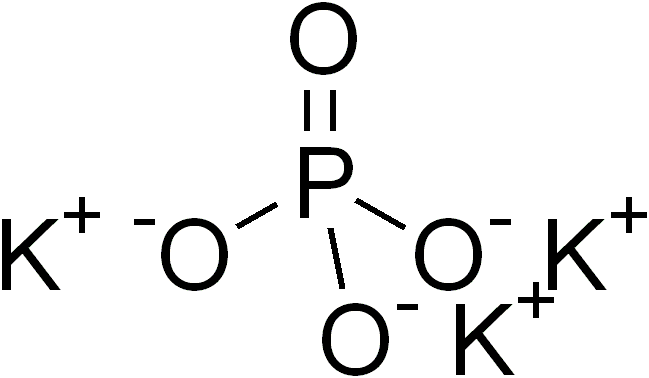

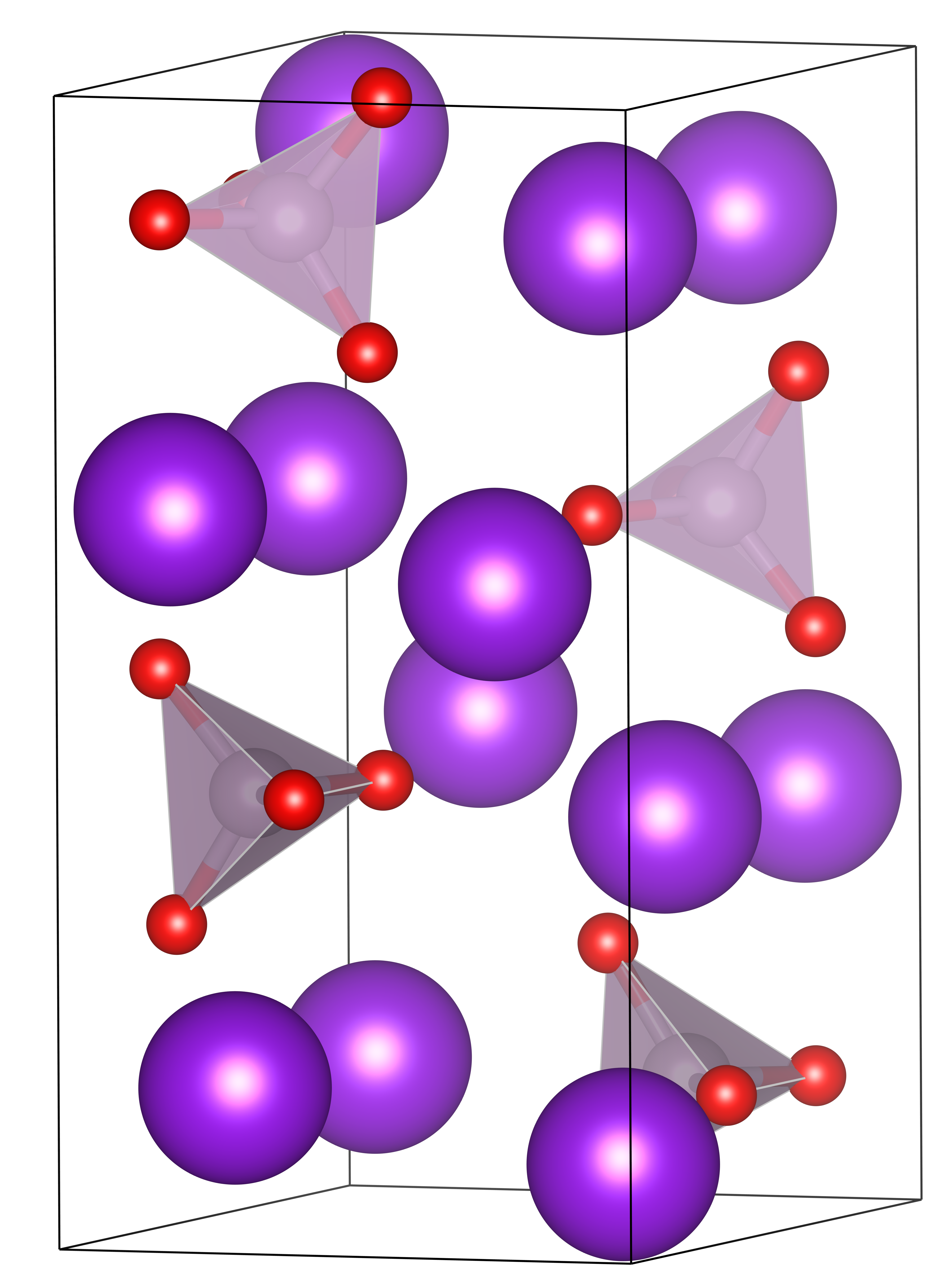
- Unit cell of tripotassium phosphate.

Names
- IUPAC name Potassium phosphate
- Systematic IUPAC name Potassium tetraoxidophosphate(3−)
- Other names Potassium phosphate, tribasic

Identifiers
CAS Number	7778-53-2
3D model (JSmol)	Interactive image
ChEBI	CHEBI:190301
ChemSpider	56408
ECHA InfoCard	100.029.006
EC Number	231-907-1
E number	E340(iii) (antioxidants, ...)
PubChem CID	62657
UNII	16D59922JU
CompTox Dashboard (EPA)	DTXSID3043994
- InChI: InChI=1S/3K.H3O4P/c;;;1-5(2,3)4/h;;;(H3,1,2,3,4)/q3*+1;/p-3 Key: LWIHDJKSTIGBAC-UHFFFAOYSA-K
- SMILES: [K+].[K+].[K+].[O-]P([O-])([O-])=O

Properties
Chemical formula	K_{3}PO_{4}
Molar mass	212.27 g/mol
Appearance	White deliquescent powder
Density	2.564 g/cm^{3} (17 °C)
Melting point	1,380 °C (2,520 °F; 1,650 K)
Solubility in water	90 g/100 mL (20 °C)
Solubility in ethanol	Insoluble
Basicity (pK_{b})	1.6

Structure
Crystal structure	Primitive orthorhombic
Space group	Pnma, No. 62
Lattice constant	a = 1.123772 nm, b = 0.810461 nm, c = 0.592271 nm

Hazards
- Occupational safety and health (OHS/OSH)
Main hazards	Irritant
- GHS labelling
Pictograms	(GHS07: Exclamation mark)
Signal word	Warning
Hazard statements	H319
Precautionary statements	P264, P280, P305+P351+P338, P337+P313
NFPA 704 (fire diamond)	2 0 0
Flash point	Non-flammable
Safety data sheet (SDS)	MSDS

Related compounds
Other cations	Trisodium phosphate Triammonium phosphate Tricalcium phosphate
Related compounds	Monopotassium phosphate Dipotassium phosphate
- Except where otherwise noted, data are given for materials in their standard state (at 25 °C [77 °F], 100 kPa). verify (what is ?) Infobox references

Tripotassium phosphate, also called tribasic potassium phosphate is a water-soluble salt with the chemical formula K_{3}PO_{4}^{.}(H_{2}O)_{x} (x = 0, 3, 7, 9). Tripotassium phosphate is basic: a 1% aqueous solution has a pH of 11.8.

== Production ==
Tripotassium phosphate is produced by the neutralization of phosphoric acid with potassium hydroxide:

H_{3}PO_{4} + 3KOH → K_{3}PO_{4} + 3H_{2}O

== Use in organic chemistry ==
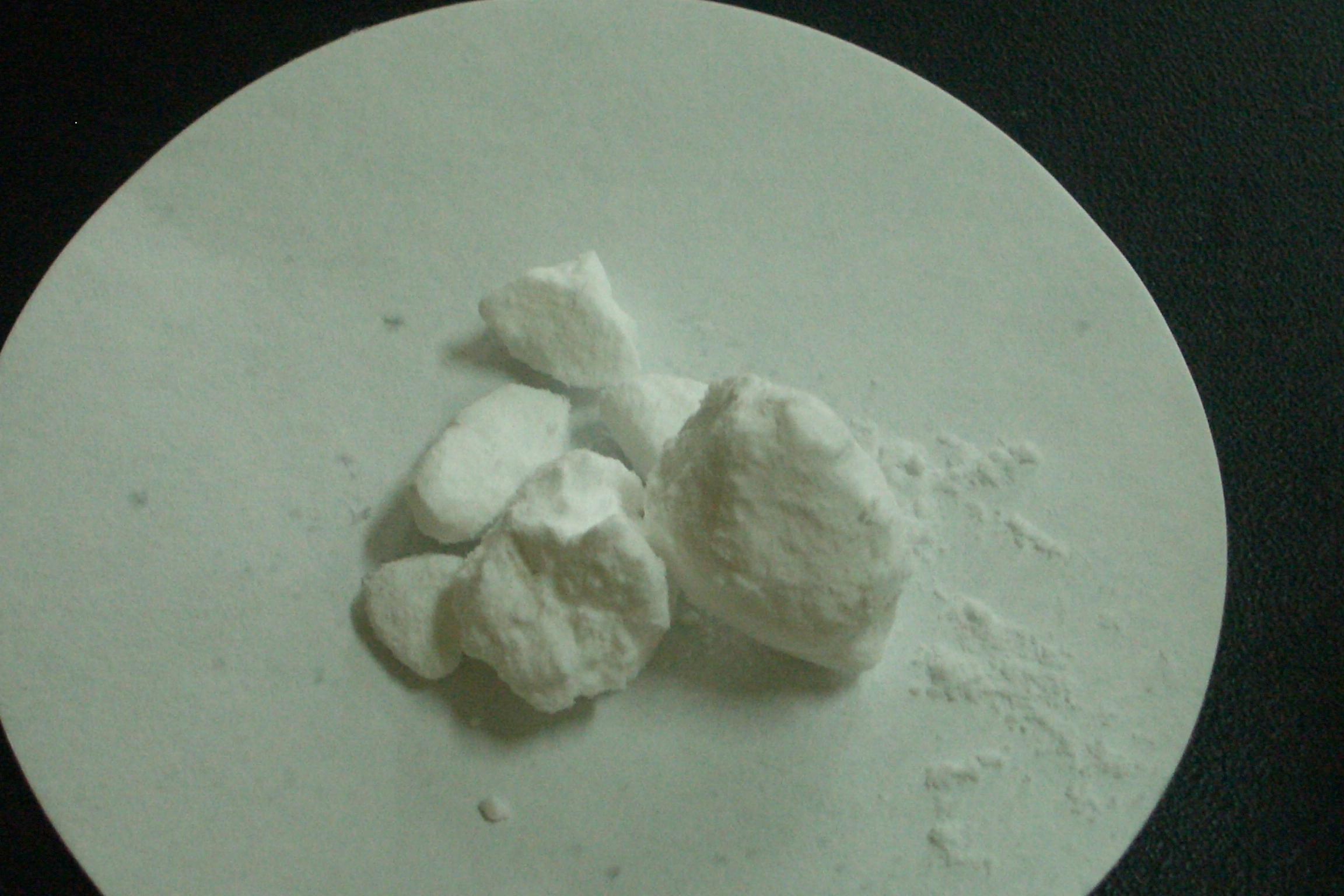
K3PO4

Tripotassium phosphate has few industrial applications, however it is commonly used as a base in laboratory-scale organic chemistry. Being insoluble in organic solvents, it is an easily removed proton acceptor in organic synthesis. The anhydrous salt is especially basic. Some of the reactions are listed below:

1. The hydrate (K_{3}PO_{4}·H_{2}O) has been used to catalyze the deprotection of BOC amines. Microwave radiation is used to aid the reaction.
2. As a catalyst for the synthesis of unsymmetrical diaryl ethers using [Bmim]BF_{4} as the solvent. Aryl methane-sulfonates are deprotected and then followed by a nucleophilic aromatic substitution (S_{N}Ar) with activated aryl halides.
3. As a base in the cross-coupling reaction of aryl halides with terminal alkynes. It also plays a role in the deacetonation of 4-aryl-2-methylbut-3-yn-2-ol intermediates.
4. As the base in the cross-coupling reaction between aryl halides and phenols or aliphatic alcohols.

== Use in foods ==
Tripotassium phosphate can be used in foods as a buffering agent, emulsifying agent, and for nutrient fortification. It can serve as a sodium-free substitute for trisodium phosphate. The ingredient is most common in dry cereals but is also found in meat, sauces, and cheeses.

== Use as plant food ==
Anhydrous tripotassium phosphate has an NPK of 0-33-66.
