= Methylenediurea deaminase =

Class of enzymes

Identifiers
- EC no.: 3.5.1.141
- CAS no.: 205830-62-2

Databases
- BRENDA: enzyme data
- ExPASy: NiceZyme view
- KEGG: enzyme entry
- MetaCyc: metabolic pathway
- Rhea: reactions
- PDB structures: RCSB PDB PDBe PDBsum
Search
- PMC: articles
- PubMed: articles
- NCBI: proteins

Methylenediurea deaminase (EC 3.5.1.141, methylenediurease) is an enzyme with systematic name methylenediurea aminohydrolase found in Brucella anthropi, a bacterium. It catalyses the hydrolysis of methylene diurea, with the overall effect of giving urea, ammonia, carbon dioxide and formaldehyde after decarboxylation of unstable intermediates:

methylene diurea
2 H_{2}O
2 NH_{3}
urea
+ CO_{2} + HCHO

The enzyme has been implicated in the breakdown of slow-release urea-formaldehyde fertilisers.
