= C6H14N4O2 =

The molecular formula C_{6}H_{14}N_{4}O_{2} (molar mass: 174.20 g/mol, exact mass: 174.1117 u) may refer to:

- Adipic acid dihydrazide (ADH)
- Arginine (Arg or R)
- Isobutylidenediurea (IBDU)
