= Monopotassium phosphate =

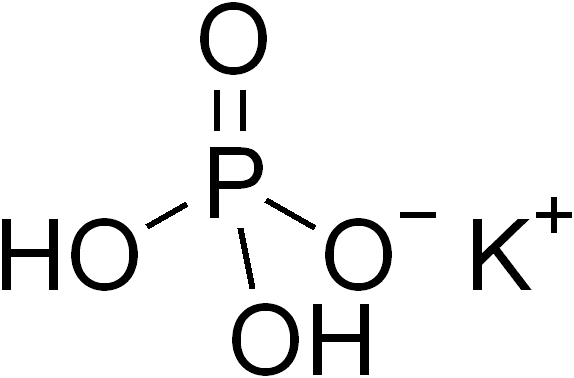

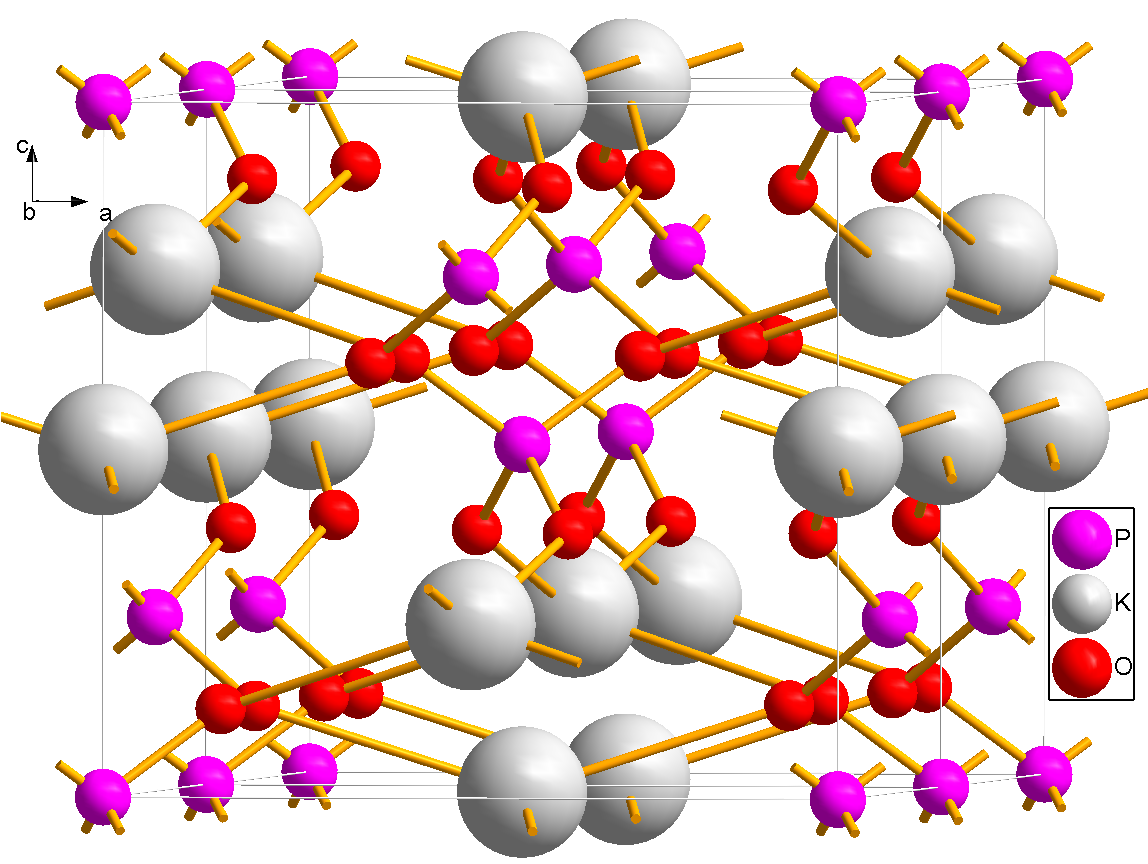
- Two unit cells of MKP viewed close to the b axis

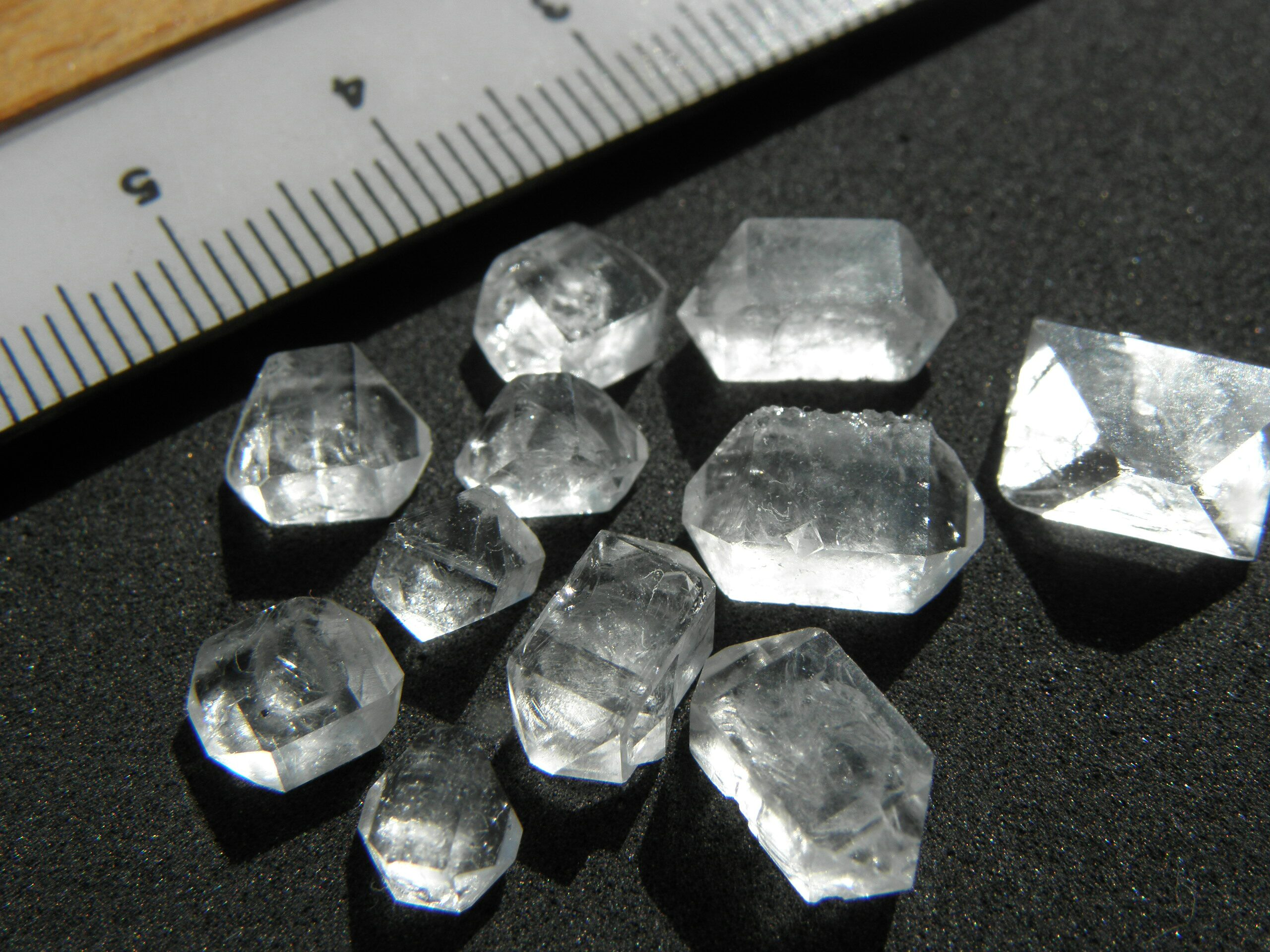

Names
- IUPAC names Potassium dihydrogen phosphate
- Other names Potassium phosphate monobasic; Phosphoric acid, monopotassium salt; Potassium biphosphate

Identifiers
CAS Number	7778-77-0
3D model (JSmol)	Interactive image
ChEMBL	ChEMBL1200925
ChemSpider	22914
ECHA InfoCard	100.029.012
EC Number	231-913-4
E number	E340(i) (antioxidants, ...)
PubChem CID	516951
RTECS number	TC6615500
UNII	4J9FJ0HL51
CompTox Dashboard (EPA)	DTXSID0035667
- InChI: InChI=1S/3K.H3O4P/c;;;1-5(2,3)4/h;;;(H3,1,2,3,4)/q3*+1;/p-3 Key: LWIHDJKSTIGBAC-UHFFFAOYSA-K; InChI=1/3K.H3O4P/c;;;1-5(2,3)4/h;;;(H3,1,2,3,4)/q3*+1;/p-3 Key: LWIHDJKSTIGBAC-DFZHHIFOAX
- SMILES: [K+].OP(O)([O-])=O

Properties
Chemical formula	KH_{2}PO_{4}
Molar mass	136.086 g/mol
Appearance	Colourless crystals or white granular or crystalline powder
Odor	Odorless
Density	2.338 g/cm^{3}
Melting point	252.6 °C (486.7 °F; 525.8 K)
Boiling point	400 °C (752 °F; 673 K) , decomposes
Solubility in water	22.6 g/100 mL (20 °C); 83.5 g/100 mL (90 °C)
Solubility	Slightly soluble in ethanol
Acidity (pK_{a})	6.86
Basicity (pK_{b})	11.9
Refractive index (n_{D})	1.4864

Structure
Crystal structure	Tetragonal
Space group	I4̅2d
Lattice constant	a = 0.744 nm, b = 0.744 nm, c = 0.697 nm

Hazards
- GHS labelling
Pictograms	(GHS07: Exclamation mark)
Signal word	Warning
Hazard statements	H315, H319
Precautionary statements	P264, P280, P305+P351+P338, P321, P332+P313, P337+P313
NFPA 704 (fire diamond)	1 0 0
Flash point	Non-flammable
- Lethal dose or concentration (LD, LC)
LD_{50} (median dose)	3200 mg/kg (rat, oral)
Safety data sheet (SDS)	External MSDS

Related compounds
Other cations	Monosodium phosphate Monoammonium phosphate
Related compounds	Dipotassium phosphate Tripotassium phosphate
- Except where otherwise noted, data are given for materials in their standard state (at 25 °C [77 °F], 100 kPa). verify (what is ?) Infobox references

Monopotassium phosphate (MKP) (also, potassium dihydrogen phosphate, KDP, or monobasic potassium phosphate) is the inorganic compound with the formula KH_{2}PO_{4}. Together with dipotassium phosphate (K_{2}HPO_{4}^{.}(H_{2}O)_{x}) it is often used as a fertilizer, food additive, and buffering agent. The salt often cocrystallizes with the dipotassium salt as well as with phosphoric acid.

Single crystals are paraelectric at room temperature. At temperatures below −150 °C (−238 °F), they become ferroelectric.

== Structure ==
Monopotassium phosphate can exist in several polymorphs. At room temperature it forms paraelectric crystals with tetragonal symmetry. Upon cooling to −150 °C (−238 °F) it transforms to a ferroelectric phase of orthorhombic symmetry, and the transition temperature shifts up to −50 °C (−58 °F) when hydrogen is replaced by deuterium. Heating to 190 °C (374 °F) changes its structure to monoclinic. When heated further, MKP decomposes, by loss of water, to potassium metaphosphate, KPO_{3}, at 400 °C (752 °F).

Symmetry	Space group	№	Pearson symbol	a (nm)	b (nm)	c (nm)	Z	Density (g/cm^{3)}	T (°C, °F, K)
Orthorhombic	Fdd2	43	oF48	1.0467	1.0533	0.6926	8	2.37	< −150 °C, −238 °F, 123 K
Tetragonal	I4̅2d	122	tI24	0.744	0.744	0.697	4	2.34	−150 to 190 °C, −238 to 374 °F, 123 to 463 K
Monoclinic	P2_{1}/c	14	mP48	0.733	1.449	0.747	8		190 to 400 °C, 374 to 752 °F, 463 to 673 K

== Manufacturing ==
Monopotassium phosphate is produced by the action of phosphoric acid on potassium carbonate. It can then be crystallized into boules, large crystals by dissolving the KDP in hot water and salt, creating a growth solution, placing a seed crystal in the solution and then cooling the solution, done in a holden-type crystallizer, in what is known as solution growth.

== Applications ==
Fertilizer-grade MKP powder contains the equivalent of 52% P_{2}O_{5} and 34% K_{2}O, and is labeled NPK 0-52-34. MKP powder is often used as a nutrient source in the greenhouse trade and in hydroponics.

Crystals of MKP are used in optical modulators and for non-linear optics such as second-harmonic generation (SHG). Potassium dideuterium phosphate (KDP), with slightly different properties, is also used in nonlinear frequency conversion of laser light. The replacement of protons with deuterons in the crystal shifts the third overtone of the strong OH molecular stretch to longer wavelengths, moving it mostly out of the range of the fundamental line at approximately 1064 nm of neodymium-based lasers. Regular KDP has absorbances at this wavelength of approximately 4.7–6.3% per cm of thickness while highly deuterated KDP has absorbances of typically less than 0.8% per cm.

Monopotassium phosphate is also used as an ingredient in sports drinks such as Gatorade and Powerade.

In medicine, monopotassium phosphate is used for phosphate substitution in hypophosphatemia.

== Gallery ==
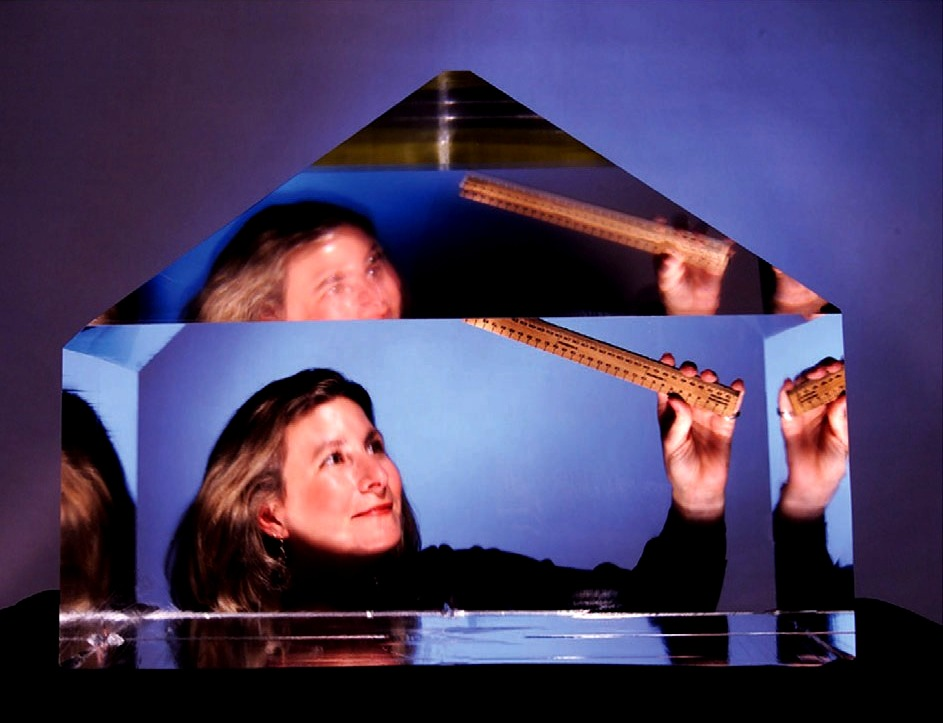
A large KDP crystal, used in the form of slices at the National Ignition Facility

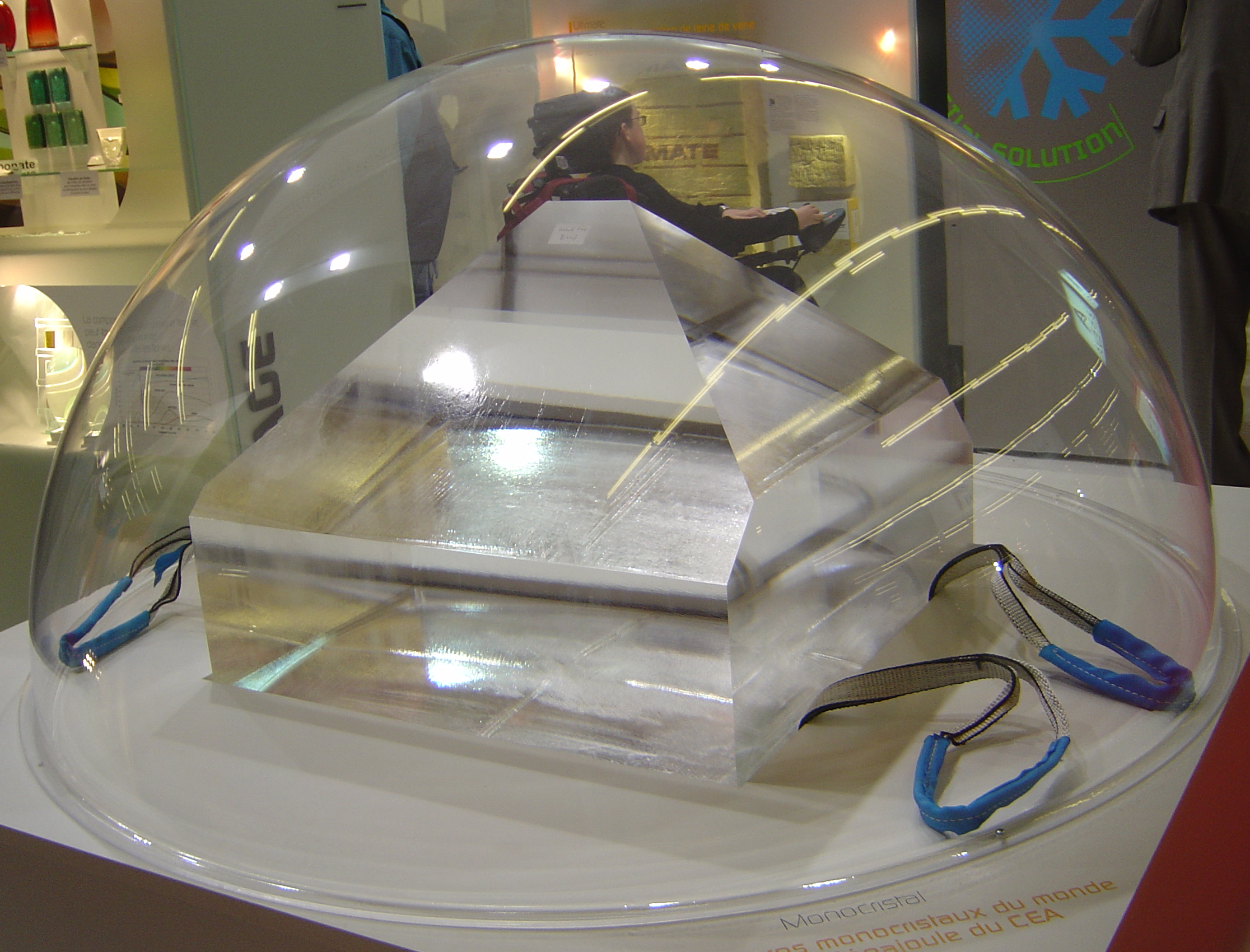
Alternate angle, covered
