= Dimethylene triurea =

Names
- Preferred IUPAC name 5-Oxo-2,4,6,8-tetraazanonane-1,9-diamide
- Other names methylenebis(urea), 5-oxo-2,4,6,8-Tetraazanonanediamide, 1,3-bis[(carbamoylamino)methyl]urea

Identifiers
CAS Number	15499-91-9
3D model (JSmol)	Interactive image
ChEBI	CHEBI:4621
ChemSpider	389825
EC Number	604-987-4
KEGG	C06385
PubChem CID	441000
CompTox Dashboard (EPA)	DTXSID70331555
- InChI: InChI=1S/C5H12N6O3/c6-3(12)8-1-10-5(14)11-2-9-4(7)13/h1-2H2,(H3,6,8,12)(H3,7,9,13)(H2,10,11,14) Key: OKNSZPQWMKXIEO-UHFFFAOYSA-N
- SMILES: C(NC(=O)N)NC(=O)NCNC(=O)N

Properties
Chemical formula	C_{5}H_{12}N_{6}O_{3}
Molar mass	204.190 g·mol^{−1}
Appearance	white solid
- Except where otherwise noted, data are given for materials in their standard state (at 25 °C [77 °F], 100 kPa). Infobox references

Dimethylene triurea (DMTU) is the organic compound with the formula (H_{2}NC(O)NHCH_{2}NH)_{2}CO. It is a white water-soluble solid. The compound is formed by the condensation of formaldehyde with urea. Both branched and linear isomers exist.

== Applications ==
DMTU is an intermediate in the production of urea-formaldehyde resins.

Together with methylene diurea, DMTU is a component of some controlled-release fertilizers.
