= Dinitroglycoluril =

Names
- IUPAC name 3,6-dinitro-1,3a,4,6a-tetrahydroimidazo[4,5-d]imidazole-2,5-dione
- Other names DNGU; 1,4-dinitroglycoluril

Identifiers
CAS Number	55510-04-8
3D model (JSmol)	Interactive image
ChemSpider	55937
ECHA InfoCard	100.054.239
EC Number	259-683-0
MeSH	1,4-dinitroglycoluril
PubChem CID	62101
UN number	0489
CompTox Dashboard (EPA)	DTXSID70970862
- InChI: InChI=1S/C4H4N6O6/c11-3-5-1-2(8(3)10(15)16)6-4(12)7(1)9(13)14/h1-2H,(H,5,11)(H,6,12) Key: YZTLXSKKFIMAKY-UHFFFAOYSA-N
- SMILES: C12C(NC(=O)N1[N+](=O)[O-])N(C(=O)N2)[N+](=O)[O-]

Properties
Chemical formula	C_{4}H_{4}N_{6}O_{6}
Molar mass	232.112 g·mol^{−1}
Density	1.94 g/cm^{3}
Boiling point	252.87 °C (explosive decomposition)

Thermochemistry
Std molar entropy (S^{⦵}_{298})	128.4 J/(mol·K)
Std enthalpy of formation (Δ_{f}H^{⦵}_{298})	−74 kcal/mol

Explosive data
Detonation velocity	8450 m/s

Related compounds
Related compounds	Glycoluril
- Except where otherwise noted, data are given for materials in their standard state (at 25 °C [77 °F], 100 kPa). Infobox references

Dinitroglycoluril (DNGU) is a high explosive chemical compound with the formula C_{4}H_{4}N_{6}O_{6}. Dinitroglycoluril is of growing interest due to its stability, ability to mix with oxygen positive explosives to form composites, and it is a precursor to tetranitroglycoluril.

== Preparation and decomposition ==
Dinitroglycoluril can be created by nitrating glycoluril with concentrated nitric acid.

C_{4}H_{6}N_{4}O_{2} + 2 HNO_{3} → C_{4}H_{4}N_{6}O_{6} + 2 H_{2}O

The activation energy required to begin decomposition of dinitroglycoluril is 165 kJ/mol. When dinitroglycoluril is heated to 243 °C in an inert atmosphere, the two nitrate groups break off and the two central carbon atoms form a double bond.

== Sensitivity ==
The impact sensitivity of dinitroglycoluril was determined using the Bruceton-staircase procedure, which found a h_{50} of 88 cm. Friction sensitivity was determined by a Julius-Peters apparatus, which found a sensitivity of 25 kg.
