= Dipotassium phosphate =

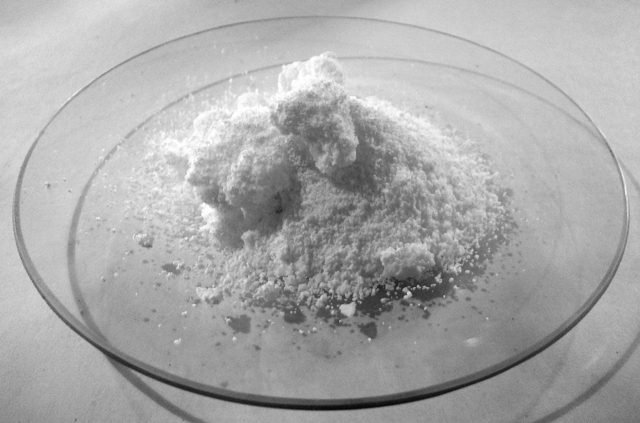

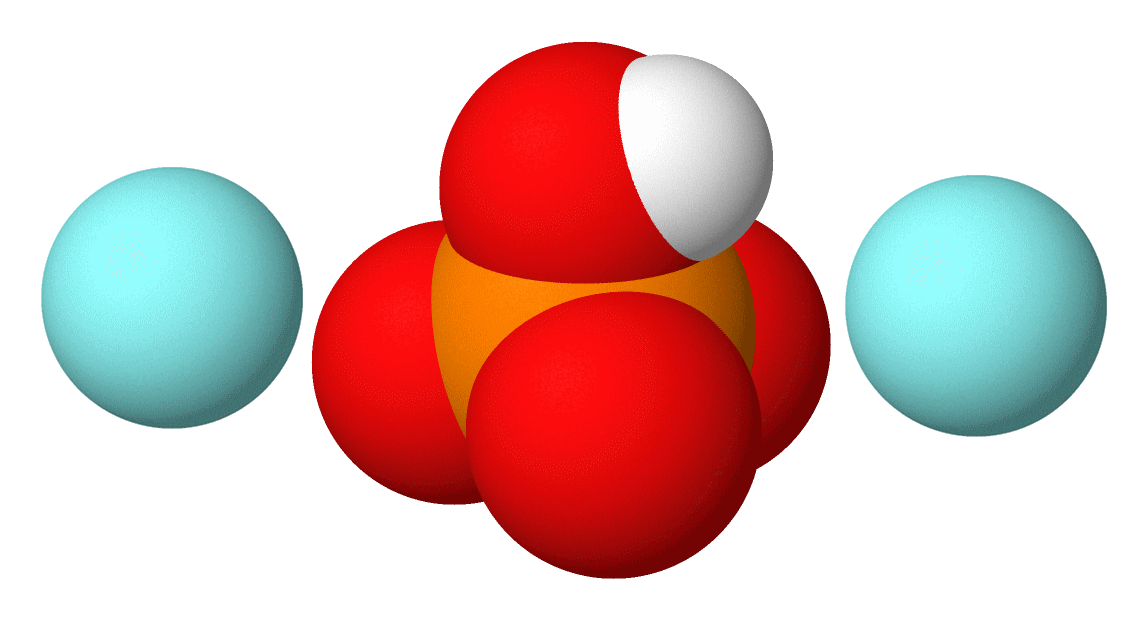

Names
- IUPAC name Potassium hydrogen phosphate
- Other names Potassium monohydrogen phosphate Phosphoric acid dipotassium salt Potassium phosphate dibasic

Identifiers
CAS Number	7758-11-4; 16788-57-1 (trihydrate)
3D model (JSmol)	Interactive image
ChEBI	CHEBI:131527
ChEMBL	ChEMBL1200459
ChemSpider	22858
ECHA InfoCard	100.028.940
EC Number	231-834-5
E number	E340(ii) (antioxidants, ...)
PubChem CID	24450
UNII	CI71S98N1Z; RJK174X3TZ (trihydrate)
CompTox Dashboard (EPA)	DTXSID8035506
- InChI: InChI=1S/2K.H3O4P/c;;1-5(2,3)4/h;;(H3,1,2,3,4)/q2*+1;/p-2 Key: ZPWVASYFFYYZEW-UHFFFAOYSA-L; InChI=1/2K.H3O4P/c;;1-5(2,3)4/h;;(H3,1,2,3,4)/q2*+1;/p-2 Key: ZPWVASYFFYYZEW-NUQVWONBAH
- SMILES: [K+].[K+].[O-]P([O-])(=O)O

Properties
Chemical formula	K_{2}HPO_{4}
Molar mass	174.2 g/mol
Appearance	white powder deliquescent
Odor	odorless
Density	2.44 g/cm^{3}
Melting point	> 465 °C (869 °F; 738 K) decomposes
Solubility in water	149.25 g/100 mL (20 °C)
Solubility	slightly soluble in alcohol
Acidity (pK_{a})	12.4
Basicity (pK_{b})	6.8

Hazards
NFPA 704 (fire diamond)	1 0 0
Flash point	Non-flammable

Related compounds
Other cations	Disodium phosphate Diammonium phosphate
Related compounds	Monopotassium phosphate Tripotassium phosphate
- Except where otherwise noted, data are given for materials in their standard state (at 25 °C [77 °F], 100 kPa). verify (what is ?) Infobox references

Dipotassium phosphate (also dipotassium hydrogen orthophosphate or potassium phosphate dibasic) is the inorganic compound with the formula K_{2}HPO_{4}^{.}(H_{2}O)_{x} (x = 0, 3, 6). Together with monopotassium phosphate (KH_{2}PO_{4}^{.}(H_{2}O)_{x}), it is often used as a fertilizer, food additive, and buffering agent. It is a white or colorless solid that is soluble in water.

It is produced commercially by partial neutralization of phosphoric acid with two equivalents of potassium chloride:

H_{3}PO_{4} + 2 KCl → K_{2}HPO_{4} + 2 HCl

== Uses ==
As a food additive, dipotassium phosphate is used in imitation dairy creamers, dry powder beverages, mineral supplements, and starter cultures. It functions as an emulsifier, stabilizer and texturizer; it is also a buffering agent, and chelating agent especially for the calcium in milk products.

As a food additive, dipotassium phosphate is generally recognized as safe by the United States Food and Drug Administration, and is commonly used (in conjunction with other inorganic salts) to add taste to some brands of bottled water.
