= Isobutylidenediurea =

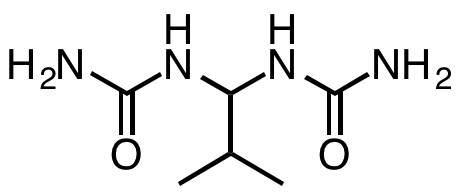

Names
- Preferred IUPAC name N,N′′-(2-Methylpropane-1,1-diyl)diurea
- Other names Isodur; Diureidoisobutane; Isobutylenediurea; Isobutylidene biurea; 1,1-Diureidisobutane; Isobutylidendiharnstoff;1,1'-Isobutylidenedi-urea; 1,1'-Isobutylidenebisurea; N,N-(isobutylidene)diurea; N,N-(Isobutylidene)bisurea

Identifiers
CAS Number	6104-30-9
3D model (JSmol)	Interactive image
ChemSpider	21083
ECHA InfoCard	100.025.505
EC Number	228-055-8
MeSH	C014058
PubChem CID	22478
UNII	20K1225668
CompTox Dashboard (EPA)	DTXSID8027614
- InChI: InChI=1S/C6H14N4O2/c1-3(2)4(9-5(7)11)10-6(8)12/h3-4H,1-2H3,(H3,7,9,11)(H3,8,10,12) Key: QFHMNFAUXJAINK-UHFFFAOYSA-N; InChI=1/C6H14N4O2/c1-3(2)4(9-5(7)11)10-6(8)12/h3-4H,1-2H3,(H3,7,9,11)(H3,8,10,12) Key: QFHMNFAUXJAINK-UHFFFAOYAM
- SMILES: CC(C)C(NC(=O)N)NC(=O)N

Properties
Chemical formula	C_{6}H_{14}N_{4}O_{2}
Molar mass	174.204 g·mol^{−1}
Appearance	White solid
Solubility in water	Low
- Except where otherwise noted, data are given for materials in their standard state (at 25 °C [77 °F], 100 kPa). Infobox references

Isobutylidenediurea (abbreviated IBDU) is an organic compound with the formula (CH_{3})_{2}CHCH{NHC(O)NH_{2}}_{2}. It is a derivative of urea (OC(NH_{2})_{2}), which itself is highly soluble in water, but IBDU is not. It functions as a controlled-release fertiliser owing to its low solubility, which limits the rate of its hydrolysis to urea, which is a fast-acting fertiliser.

It is produced by the condensation reaction of isobutyraldehyde and two equivalents of urea:

(CH_{3})_{2}CHCHO + 2 OC(NH_{2})_{2} → (CH_{3})_{2}CHCH{NHC(O)NH_{2}}_{2} + H_{2}O

The controlled-release process is the reverse of the above reaction, which only occurs after the IBDU dissolves.

== Related materials ==
A number of CRF's have been developed based on urea. Related to IBDU is crotonylidene diurea (Crotodur). Simpler are various urea-formaldehyde materials such as ureaform, which consists of methylene diurea and dimethylene triurea.
