= Controlled-release fertiliser =

Fertiliser that releases nutrients gradually

Methylene diurea (MDU) is component of the most popular controlled-release fertilizers.

A controlled-release fertiliser (CRF) is a granulated fertiliser that releases nutrients gradually into the soil (i.e., with a controlled release period). Controlled-release fertilizer is also known as controlled-availability fertilizer, delayed-release fertilizer, metered-release fertilizer, or slow-acting fertilizer. Usually CRF refers to nitrogen-based fertilizers. Slow- and controlled-release involve only 0.15% (562,000 tons) of the fertilizer market (1995).

== History ==
Controlled-nitrogen-release technologies based on polymers derived from combining urea and formaldehyde were first produced in 1936 and commercialized in 1955. The early product had 60 percent of the total nitrogen cold-water-insoluble, and the unreacted (quick-release) less than 15%. Methylene ureas, e.g. methylene diurea, were commercialized in the 1960s and 1970s, having 25% and 60% of the nitrogen as cold-water-insoluble, and unreacted urea nitrogen in the range of 15% to 30%.

In the 1960s in the U.S., the Tennessee Valley Authority National Fertilizer Development Center began developing sulfur-coated urea. Sulfur was used as the principal coating material because of its low cost and its value as a secondary nutrient. Usually wax or polymer is added to perfect the encapsulation. The slow-release properties depend on the degradation of the secondary sealant by soil microbes as well as mechanical imperfections (cracks, etc.) in the capsule. 6 to 16 weeks of delayed release in turf applications is typical. When a hard polymer is used as the secondary coating, the properties are a cross between diffusion-controlled particles and traditional sulfur-coated.

== Advantages ==
Many factors motivate the use of CRF, including more efficient use of the fertilizer. Illustrating the problem, it is estimated that, on average, 16% of conventional nitrogen-based fertilizers is lost by evaporation (as NH_{3}, N_{2}O, N_{2}) or run-off ammonia. Another factor favoring CRT protecting crops from chemical damage (fertiliser burn). In addition to their providing the nutrition to plants, excess fertilizers can be poisonous to the same plant. Finally important advantages are economic: fewer applications and the use of less fertiliser overall. The results (yield) is in most cases improved by >10%.

=== Environmental considerations ===
CRF has the potential to decrease nitrogenous pollution, which leads to eutrophication. The efficient use of nitrogen-base fertilizers is also relevant to the emission of N_{2}O into the atmosphere each year, of which 36% is due to human activity. The anthropogenic N_{2}O is produced by microorganisms acting on ammonia faster than the plant can uptake this nutrient.

=== Implementation ===
The fertiliser is administered either by topdressing the soil, or by mixing the fertiliser into the soil before sowing. Polymer coating of fertilizer ingredients gives tablets and spikes a 'true time-release' or 'staged nutrient release' (SNR) of fertilizer nutrients. NBPT functions as an inhibitor of the enzyme urease. Urease inhibitors, at levels of 0.05 weight percent, are added to urea-based fertilizers to control its conversion to ammonia.

== Mechanisms of release ==
Crotonylidene diurea is also used as a CRF.

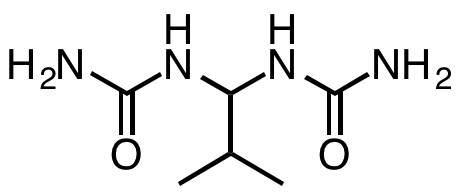
Isobutylidenediurea (IBDU) is yet another CRF.

The rate of the release is determined by various main factors: (i) the low solubility of the compounds in the soil moisture, (ii) the breakdown of protective coating applied to fertilizer pellets, and (iii) the conversion of the chemicals into ammonia or similarly effective plant nutrient.

Conventional fertilisers are soluble in water, the nutrients disperse. Because controlled-release fertilisers are not water-soluble, their nutrients disperse into the soil more slowly. The fertiliser granules may have an insoluble substrate or a semi-permeable jacket that prevents dissolution while allowing nutrients to flow outward.

== Definitions ==
The Association of American Plant Food Control Officials (AAPFCO) has published the following general definitions (Official Publication 57):

- Slow- or controlled-release fertilizer: A fertilizer containing a plant nutrient in a form which delays its availability for plant uptake and use after application, or which extends its availability to the plant significantly longer than a reference ‘rapidly available nutrient fertilizer’ such as ammonium nitrate or urea, ammonium phosphate or potassium chloride. Such delay of initial availability or extended time of continued availability may occur by a variety of mechanisms. These include controlled water solubility of the material by semi-permeable coatings, occlusion, protein materials, or other chemical forms, by slow hydrolysis of water-soluble low molecular weight compounds, or by other unknown means.
- Stabilized nitrogen fertilizer: A fertilizer to which a nitrogen stabilizer has been added. A nitrogen stabilizer is a substance added to a fertilizer which extends the time the nitrogen component of the fertilizer remains in the soil in the urea-N or ammoniacal-N form.
- Nitrification inhibitor: A substance that inhibits the biological oxidation of ammoniacal-N to nitrate-N.
- Urease inhibitor: A substance that inhibits hydrolytic action on urea by the enzyme urease.

== Examples ==
Most slow-release fertilizers are derivatives of urea, a straight fertilizer providing nitrogen. Isobutylidenediurea ("IBDU") and urea-formaldehyde slowly convert in the soil to urea, which is rapidly uptaken by plants. IBDU is a single compound with the formula (CH_{3})_{2}CHCH(NHC(O)NH_{2})_{2} whereas the urea-formaldehydes consist of mixtures of the approximate formula (HOCH_{2}NHC(O)NH)_{n}CH_{2}.

Controlled release fertilizers are traditional fertilizers encapsulated in a shell that degrades at a specified rate. Sulfur is a typical encapsulation material. Other coated products use thermoplastics (and sometimes ethylene-vinyl acetate and surfactants, etc.) to produce diffusion-controlled release of urea or other fertilizers. "Reactive Layer Coating" can produce thinner, hence cheaper, membrane coatings by applying reactive monomers simultaneously to the soluble particles. "Multicote" is a process applying layers of low-cost fatty acid salts with a paraffin topcoat. Recently, biodegradable polymers as coatings for slow/controlled-release fertilizer have attracted interest for their potential to increase fertilizer/pesticide utilization efficiency and reduce negative environmental effects.

== See also ==
- Seed ball
- Coated urea
