= Bis(hydroxymethyl)urea =

Names
- Preferred IUPAC name N,N′-Bis(hydroxymethyl)urea
- Other names dimethylolurea

Identifiers
CAS Number	140-95-4
3D model (JSmol)	Interactive image
ChEBI	CHEBI:134755
ChEMBL	ChEMBL3185052
ChemSpider	8496
ECHA InfoCard	100.004.950
EC Number	205-444-0
PubChem CID	8827
UNII	N68H97CAWG
CompTox Dashboard (EPA)	DTXSID6025141
- InChI: InChI=1S/C3H8N2O3/c6-1-4-3(8)5-2-7/h6-7H,1-2H2,(H2,4,5,8) Key: QUBQYFYWUJJAAK-UHFFFAOYSA-N
- SMILES: C(NC(=O)NCO)O

Properties
Chemical formula	C_{3}H_{8}N_{2}O_{3}
Molar mass	120.11
Appearance	white solid
Melting point	126 °C
Solubility in water	good
- Except where otherwise noted, data are given for materials in their standard state (at 25 °C [77 °F], 100 kPa). Infobox references

Bis(hydroxymethyl)urea is an organic compound with the formula OC(NHCH_{2}OH)_{2}. This white water-soluble solid is an intermediate in the formation of urea-formaldehyde resins. It forms upon treatment of urea with an excess of formaldehyde. The compound effectively inhibits the corrosion of steel by acids.
