= Ammonium phosphate =

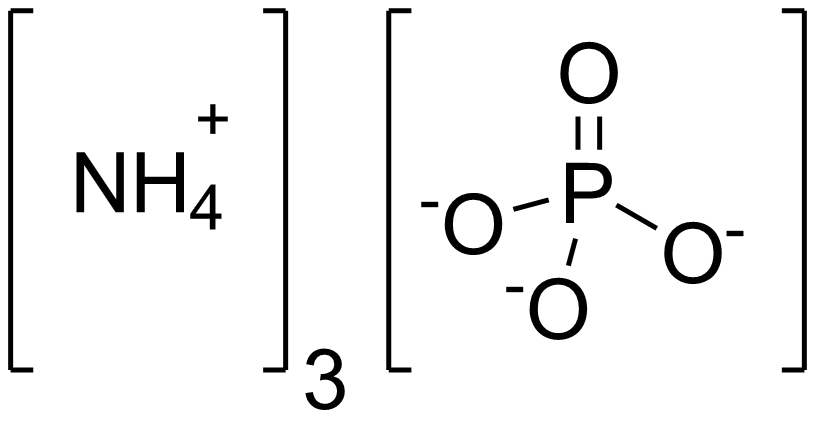

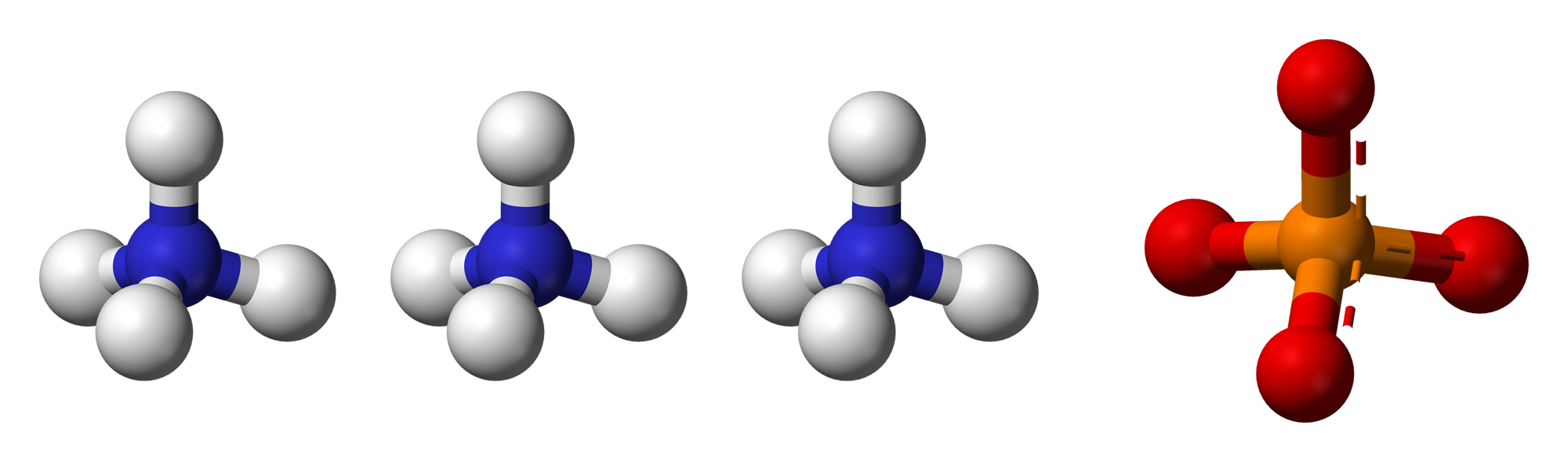
- Ball-and-stick model of three ammonium cations and one phosphate anion

Names
- IUPAC name ammonium phosphate
- Other names triammonium phosphate

Identifiers
CAS Number	10361-65-6
3D model (JSmol)	Interactive image
ChemSpider	140090
ECHA InfoCard	100.030.709
EC Number	269-789-9
PubChem CID	159282
UNII	2ZJF06M0I9
CompTox Dashboard (EPA)	DTXSID8052778
- InChI: InChI=1S/3H3N.H3O4P/c;;;1-5(2,3)4/h3*1H3;(H3,1,2,3,4) Key: ZRIUUUJAJJNDSS-UHFFFAOYSA-N; InChI=1/3H3N.H3O4P/c;;;1-5(2,3)4/h3*1H3;(H3,1,2,3,4) Key: ZRIUUUJAJJNDSS-UHFFFAOYAA
- SMILES: [O-]P([O-])([O-])=O.[NH4+].[NH4+].[NH4+]

Properties
Chemical formula	(NH_{4})_{3}PO_{4}
Molar mass	149.087 g·mol^{−1}
Appearance	White, tetrahedral crystals
Solubility in water	58.0 g/100 mL (25 °C)
Solubility	Insoluble in acetone

Hazards
- GHS labelling
Pictograms	(GHS07: Exclamation mark)
Signal word	Warning
Hazard statements	H302, H319
Precautionary statements	P264, P270, P280, P301+P312, P305+P351+P338, P330, P337+P313, P501
NFPA 704 (fire diamond)	2 0 0

Thermochemistry
Std enthalpy of formation (Δ_{f}H^{⦵}_{298})	−1671.9 kJ/mol

Related compounds
Other cations	Trisodium phosphate Tripotassium phosphate
Related compounds	Diammonium phosphate Monoammonium phosphate
- Except where otherwise noted, data are given for materials in their standard state (at 25 °C [77 °F], 100 kPa). verify (what is ?) Infobox references

Ammonium phosphate is the inorganic compound with the formula (NH_{4})_{3}PO_{4}. It is the ammonium salt of orthophosphoric acid. A related double salt, (NH_{4})_{3}PO_{4}^{.}(NH_{4})_{2}HPO_{4} is also recognized but is impractical to use. Both triammonium salts evolve ammonia. In contrast to the unstable nature of the triammonium salts, the diammonium phosphate (NH_{4})_{2}HPO_{4} and monoammonium salt (NH_{4})H_{2}PO_{4} are stable materials that are commonly used as fertilizers to provide plants with fixed nitrogen and phosphorus.

Ammonium phosphate is the main ingredient in pink fire retardant.

== Preparation of triammonium phosphate ==
Triammonium phosphate can be prepared in the laboratory by treating 85% phosphoric acid with 30% ammonia solution:

H_{3}PO_{4} + 3 NH_{3} → (NH_{4})_{3}PO_{4}

(NH_{4})_{3}PO_{4} is a colorless, crystalline solid. The solid, which has the odor of ammonia, is readily soluble in water. The salt converts to diammonium hydrogen phosphate (NH_{4})_{2}HPO_{4}.

== See also ==
- Ammonium polyphosphate
- Monoammonium phosphate
- Diammonium phosphate
