= Methylene diurea =

Names
- Preferred IUPAC name N,N′′-Methylenediurea
- Other names methylenebis(urea), (carbamoylamino)methylurea

Identifiers
CAS Number	13547-17-6
3D model (JSmol)	Interactive image
Beilstein Reference	1812254
ChEBI	CHEBI:10790
ChemSpider	55553
ECHA InfoCard	100.033.547
EC Number	236-918-5
Gmelin Reference	694187
KEGG	C06381
PubChem CID	61645
UNII	TT2013TAE9
CompTox Dashboard (EPA)	DTXSID6042155
- InChI: InChI=1S/C3H8N4O2/c4-2(8)6-1-7-3(5)9/h1H2,(H3,4,6,8)(H3,5,7,9) Key: KQVLODRFGIKJHZ-UHFFFAOYSA-N
- SMILES: C(NC(=O)N)NC(=O)N

Properties
Chemical formula	C_{3}H_{8}N_{4}O_{2}
Molar mass	132.123 g·mol^{−1}
Appearance	white solid
Melting point	203 °C (397 °F; 476 K)

Hazards
- GHS labelling
Pictograms	(GHS07: Exclamation mark)
Signal word	Warning
Hazard statements	H315, H319, H335
Precautionary statements	P261, P264, P271, P280, P302+P352, P304+P340, P305+P351+P338, P312, P321, P332+P313, P337+P313, P362, P403+P233, P405, P501
- Except where otherwise noted, data are given for materials in their standard state (at 25 °C [77 °F], 100 kPa). Infobox references

Methylene diurea (MDU) is the organic compound with the formula CH_{2}(NHC(O)NH_{2})_{2}. It is a white water-soluble solid. The compound is formed by the condensation of formaldehyde with urea. Methylene diurea is the substrate for the enzyme methylenediurea deaminase.

== Applications ==
MDU is an intermediate in the production of urea-formaldehyde resins.

Together with dimethylene triurea, MDU is a component of some controlled-release fertilizers.
