= Diammonium phosphate =

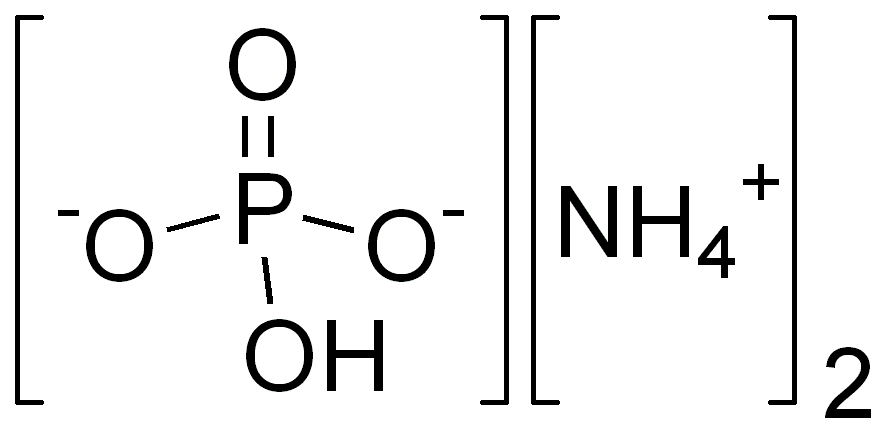

Names
- IUPAC name diammonium hydrogen phosphate
- Other names ammonium monohydrogen phosphate, ammonium hydrogen phosphate, ammonium phosphate dibasic

Identifiers
CAS Number	7783-28-0
3D model (JSmol)	Interactive image
Abbreviations	DAP
ChEBI	CHEBI:63051
ChemSpider	22946
ECHA InfoCard	100.029.079
E number	E342(ii) (antioxidants, ...)
PubChem CID	24540
UNII	10LGE70FSU
CompTox Dashboard (EPA)	DTXSID6029705
- InChI: InChI=1S/2H3N.H3O4P/c;;1-5(2,3)4/h2*1H3;(H3,1,2,3,4) Key: MNNHAPBLZZVQHP-UHFFFAOYSA-N; InChI=1/2H3N.H3O4P/c;;1-5(2,3)4/h2*1H3;(H3,1,2,3,4)/p-1 Key: MNNHAPBLZZVQHP-REWHXWOFAG
- SMILES: [NH4+].[NH4+].OP([O-])([O-])=O

Properties
Chemical formula	(NH_{4})_{2}HPO_{4}
Molar mass	132.056 g·mol^{−1}
Appearance	colorless monoclinic crystals
Density	1.619 g/cm^{3}
Melting point	155 °C (311 °F; 428 K) decomposes
Solubility in water	57.5 g/100 mL (10 °C); 106.7 g/100 mL (70 °C)
Solubility	insoluble in alcohol, acetone and liquid ammonia
Refractive index (n_{D})	1.52

Thermochemistry
Std enthalpy of formation (Δ_{f}H^{⦵}_{298})	−1566.91 kJ/mol

Hazards
NFPA 704 (fire diamond)	2 0 1
Flash point	Non-flammable
Safety data sheet (SDS)	ICSC 0217

Related compounds
Other anions	Monoammonium phosphate Triammonium phosphate
Other cations	Disodium phosphate Dipotassium phosphate
Related compounds	Ammonium nitrate Ammonium sulfate
- Except where otherwise noted, data are given for materials in their standard state (at 25 °C [77 °F], 100 kPa). verify (what is ?) Infobox references

Diammonium phosphate (DAP; IUPAC name diammonium hydrogen phosphate; chemical formula (NH_{4})_{2}(HPO_{4})) is one of a series of water-soluble ammonium phosphate salts that can be produced when ammonia reacts with phosphoric acid.

Solid diammonium phosphate shows a dissociation pressure of ammonia as given by the following expression and equation:

(NH_{4})_{2}HPO_{4}(s) ⇌ NH_{3}(g) + (NH_{4})H_{2}PO_{4}(s)

At 100 °C, the dissociation pressure of diammonium phosphate is approximately 5 mmHg.

According to the diammonium phosphate MSDS from CF Industries, Inc., decomposition starts as low as 70 °C: "Hazardous Decomposition Products: Gradually loses ammonia when exposed to air at room temperature. Decomposes to ammonia and monoammonium phosphate at around 70 °C (158 °F). At 155 °C (311 °F), DAP emits phosphorus oxides, nitrogen oxides and ammonia."

== Uses ==
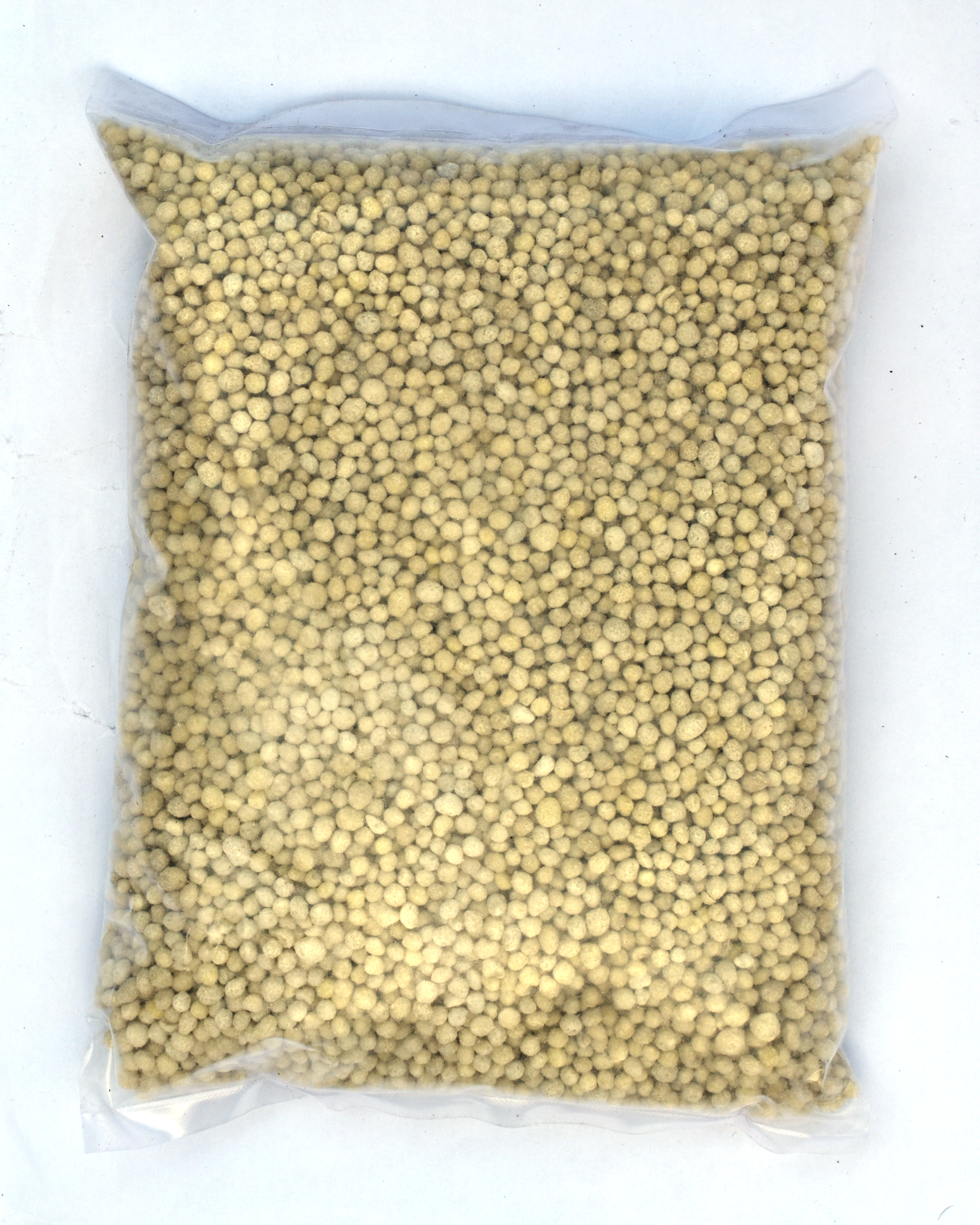
DAP (Di-Ammonium Phosphate) in a 1 kg commercial package

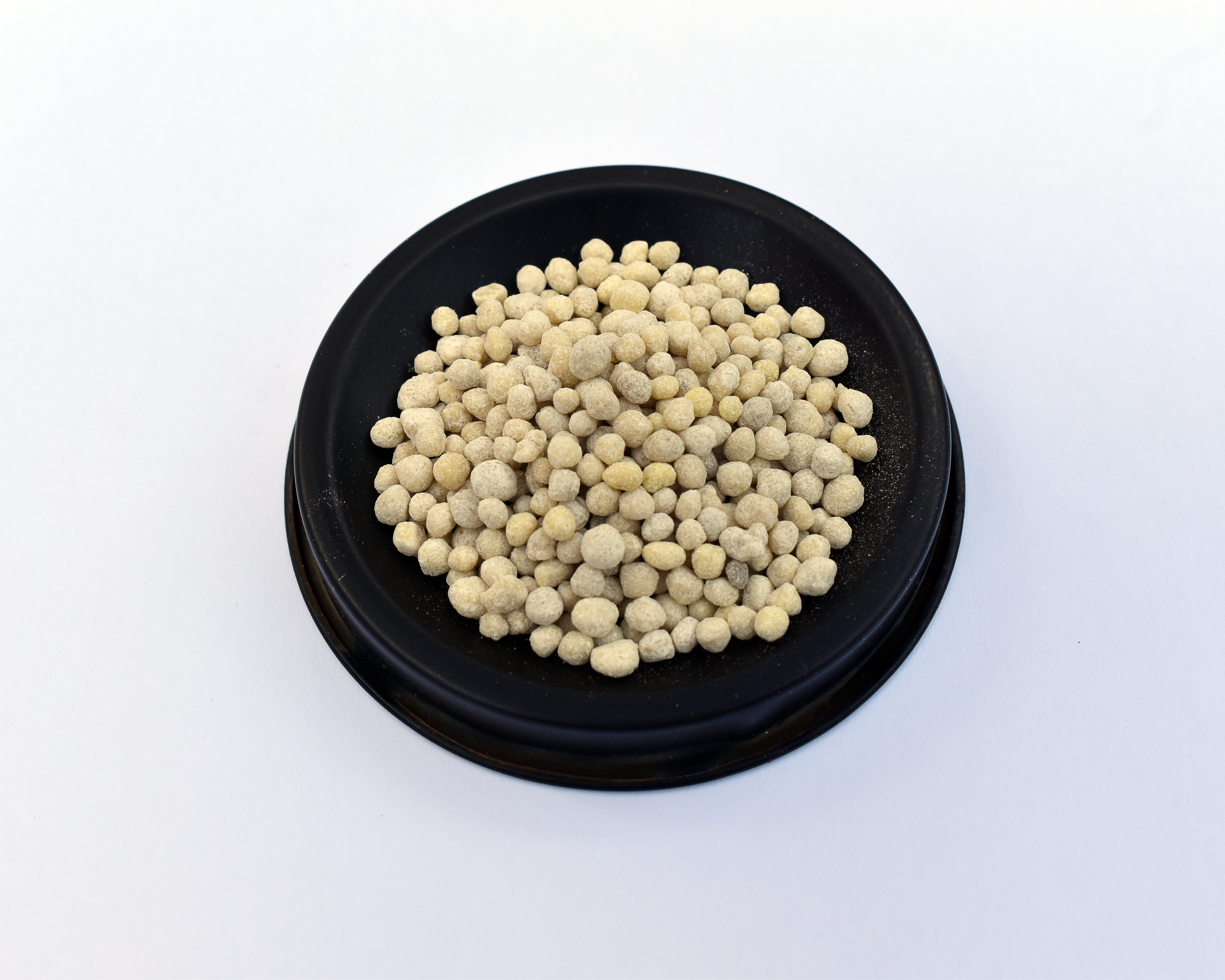
DAP (Diammonium Phosphate) Granules

DAP is used as a fertilizer. When applied as plant fertilizer, it temporarily increases the soil pH, but over a long term the treated ground becomes more acidic than before, upon nitrification of the ammonium. It is incompatible with alkaline chemicals because its ammonium ion is more likely to convert to ammonia in a high-pH environment. The average pH in solution is 7.5–8. The typical NPK ratio is 18-46-0 (18% N, 46% P_{2}O_{5}, 0% K_{2}O).

DAP can be used as a fire retardant. It lowers the combustion temperature of the material, decreases maximum weight loss rates, and causes an increase in the production of residue or char. These are important effects in fighting wildfires as lowering the pyrolysis temperature and increasing the amount of char formed reduces that amount of available fuel and can lead to the formation of a firebreak.

DAP is also used as a yeast nutrient in winemaking and mead-making; as an additive in some brands of cigarettes purportedly as a nicotine enhancer; to prevent afterglow in matches, in purifying sugar; as a flux for soldering tin, copper, zinc and brass; and to control precipitation of alkali-soluble and acid-insoluble colloidal dyes on wool.

== Natural occurrence ==
The compound occurs in the nature as the exceedingly rare mineral phosphammite. The related dihydrogen compound occurs as the mineral biphosphammite. Both are related to guano deposits.
