= Leaf scorch =

Browning of plant tissues

Leaf scorch (also called leaf burn, leaf wilt, and sun scorch) is a browning of plant tissues, including leaf margins and tips, and yellowing or darkening of veins which may lead to eventual wilting and abscission of the leaf.

== Causes ==
Leaf scorch can be caused by soil compaction, transplant shock, nutrient deficiency, nutrient excess, drought, salt toxicity, herbicide injury, and disease injury.

== Treatment ==
Affected plants may sometimes recover through watering and fertilization (if the cause is not over-fertilization). Light pruning may also help to reduce the water-pumping load on the roots and xylem.

In the case of leaf scorch through over-fertilization, recovery may take time, requiring a treatment of a slow leaching process through drip irrigation over 24–48 hours.

== Prevention ==
Reversal of symptoms and damage can be enacted through the following cultural practices:

- Pruning sprouts and affected areas
- Avoiding frequent, light waterings which promote unhealthy root systems
- Watering heavily to promote deep root systems
- Avoiding over-fertilization

== See also ==
- Fertilizer
- Forest pathology
- Nitrogen burn
