= Ammonium dihydrogen phosphate =

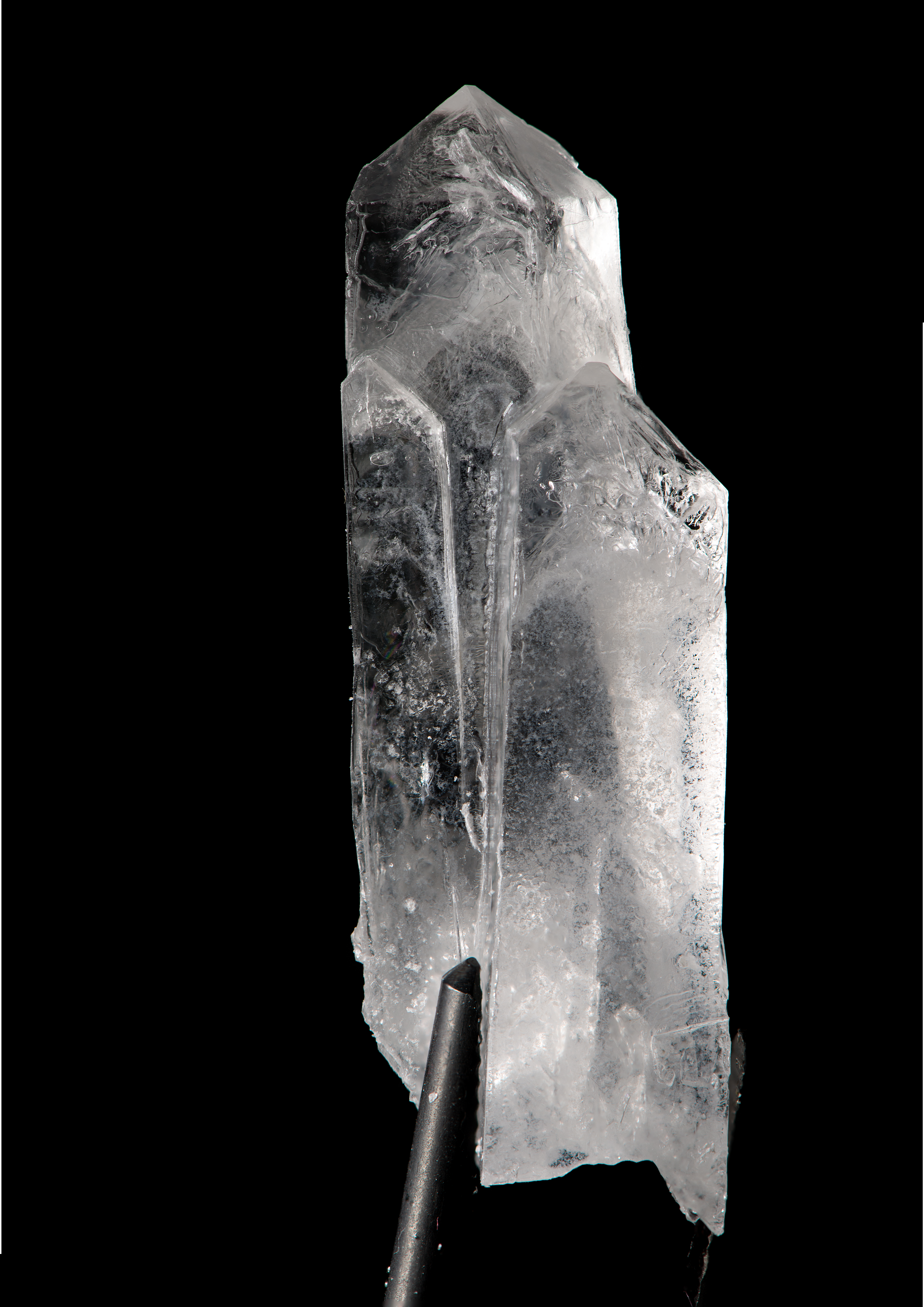

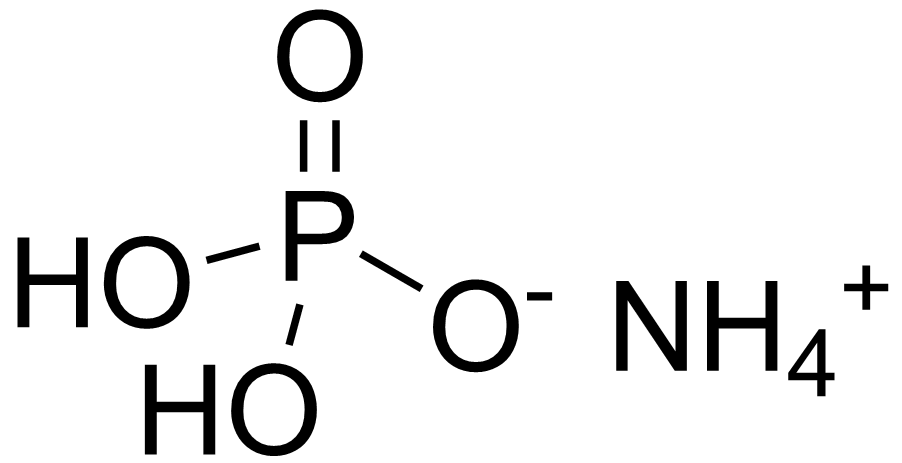

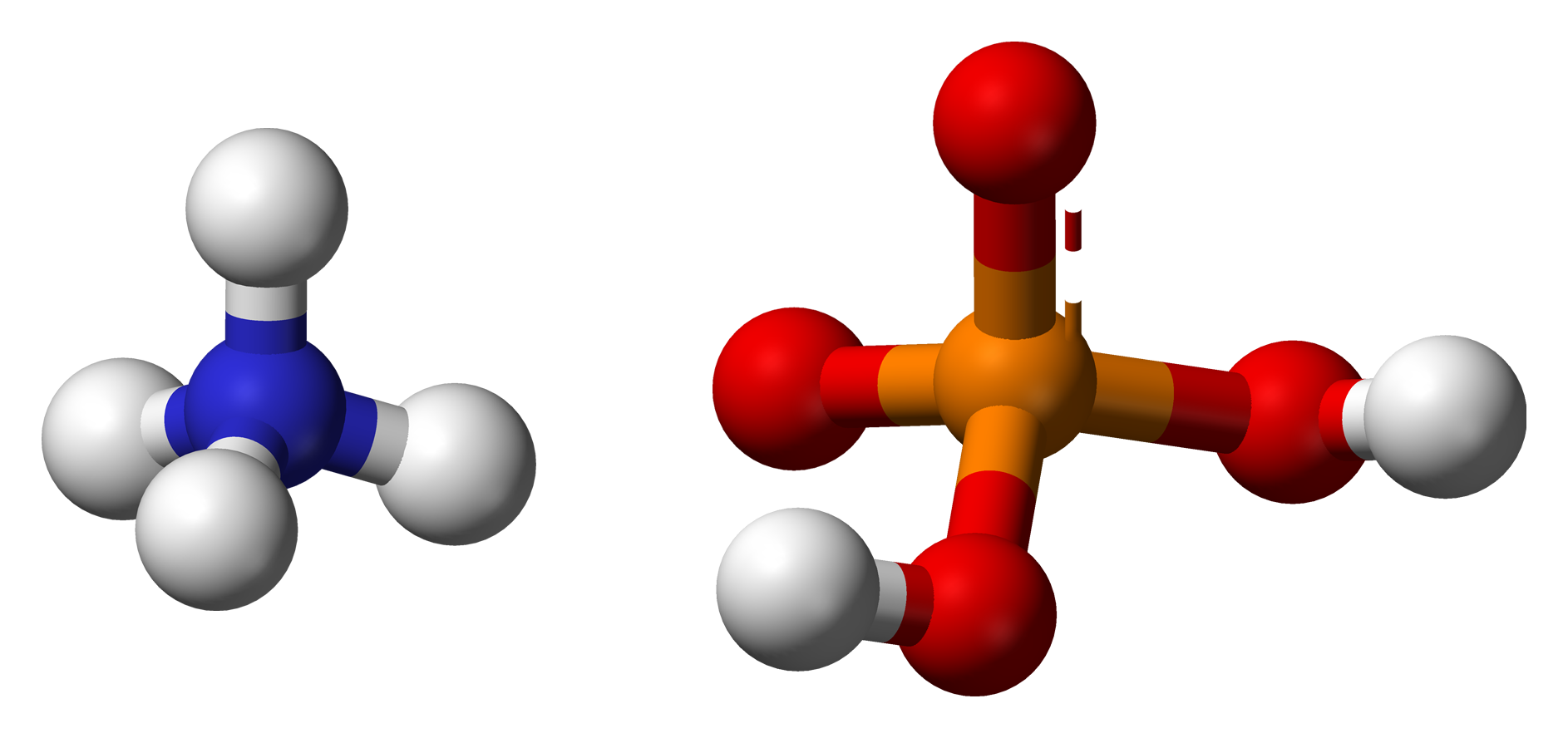

Names
- IUPAC name Ammonium dihydrogen phosphate
- Other names Monoammonium phosphate

Identifiers
CAS Number	7722-76-1
3D model (JSmol)	Interactive image
ChEBI	CHEBI:62982
ChemSpider	22812
ECHA InfoCard	100.028.877
EC Number	231-764-5
E number	E342(i) (antioxidants, ...)
PubChem CID	24402
UNII	09254QB17T
CompTox Dashboard (EPA)	DTXSID5029689
- InChI: InChI=1S/H3N.H3O4P/c;1-5(2,3)4/h1H3;(H3,1,2,3,4) Key: LFVGISIMTYGQHF-UHFFFAOYSA-N
- SMILES: [O-]P(=O)(O)O.[NH4+]

Properties
Chemical formula	NH_{4}H_{2}PO_{4}
Molar mass	115.025 g·mol^{−1}
Appearance	white crystals
Odor	none
Density	1.80 g/cm^{3}
Melting point	190 °C (374 °F; 463 K)
Solubility in water	280 g/L (10 °C); 360 g/L (20 °C); 440 g/L (30 °C); 560 g/L (40 °C); 660 g/L (50 °C); 810 g/L (60 °C); 990 g/L (70 °C); 1180 g/L (80 °C); 1730 g/L (100 °C)
Solubility in ethanol	insoluble
Solubility in acetone	insoluble
Refractive index (n_{D})	1.525

Structure
Crystal structure	tetragonal

Thermochemistry
Std enthalpy of formation (Δ_{f}H^{⦵}_{298})	−1445.07 kJ/mol

Hazards
- GHS labelling
Pictograms	(GHS07: Exclamation mark)
Signal word	Warning
Hazard statements	H319
Precautionary statements	P261, P264, P271, P280, P302+P352, P304+P340, P305+P351+P338, P312, P321, P332+P313, P337+P313, P362, P403+P233, P405, P501
NFPA 704 (fire diamond)	1 0 0
- Lethal dose or concentration (LD, LC)
LD_{50} (median dose)	5750 mg/kg (rat, oral)

Related compounds
Other anions	Ammonium phosphate Diammonium phosphate
Other cations	Monosodium phosphate Potassium dihydrogen phosphate
- Except where otherwise noted, data are given for materials in their standard state (at 25 °C [77 °F], 100 kPa). verify (what is ?) Infobox references

Ammonium dihydrogen phosphate (ADP), also known as monoammonium phosphate (MAP) is a chemical compound with the chemical formula (NH_{4})(H_{2}PO_{4}). ADP is a major ingredient of agricultural fertilizers and dry chemical fire extinguishers. It also has significant uses in optics and electronics.

== Chemical properties ==
Monoammonium phosphate is soluble in water and crystallizes from it as the anhydrous salt in the tetragonal system, as elongated prisms or needles. It is practically insoluble in ethanol.

Solid monoammonium phosphate can be considered stable in practice for temperatures up to 200 °C, when it decomposes into gaseous ammonia NH_{3} and molten phosphoric acid H_{3}PO_{4}. At 125 °C the partial pressure of ammonia is 0.05 mm Hg.

A solution of stoichiometric monoammonium phosphate is acidic (pH 4.7 at 0.1% concentration, 4.2 at 5%).

== Preparation ==
Monoammonium phosphate is industrially prepared by the exothermic reaction of phosphoric acid and ammonia in the correct proportions:

NH_{3} + H_{3}PO_{4} → NH_{4}H_{2}PO_{4}

Crystalline MAP then precipitates.

== Uses ==
=== Agriculture ===
The largest use of monoammonium phosphate by weight is in agriculture, as an ingredient of fertilizers. It supplies soil with the elements nitrogen and phosphorus in a form usable by plants. Its NPK label is 12-61-0 (12-27-0), meaning that it contains 12% by weight of elemental nitrogen and (nominally) 61% of phosphorus pentoxide P_{2}O_{5}, or 27% of elemental phosphorus.

=== Fire extinguishers ===
The compound is also a component of the ABC powder in some dry chemical fire extinguishers.

=== Optics ===
Monoammonium phosphate is a widely used crystal in the field of optics due to its birefringence properties. As a result of its tetragonal crystal structure, this material has negative uniaxial optical symmetry with typical refractive indices n_{o} = 1.522 and n_{e} = 1.478 at optical wavelengths.

=== Electronics ===
Monoammonium phosphate crystals are piezoelectric, a property required in some active sonar transducers (the alternative being transducers that use magnetostriction). In the 1950s ADP crystals largely replaced the quartz and Rochelle salt crystals in transducers because they are easier to work than quartz and, unlike Rochelle salt, are not deliquescent.

=== Toys ===
Being relatively non-toxic, MAP is also a popular substance for recreational crystal growing, being sold as toy kits mixed with dyes of various colors.

== Natural occurrence ==
The compound appears in nature as the rare mineral biphosphammite. It is formed in guano deposits. A related compound, that is the monohydrogen counterpart, is the even more scarce phosphammite.
