= Fertilizer burn =

Plant disease caused by excess fertilizer concentration

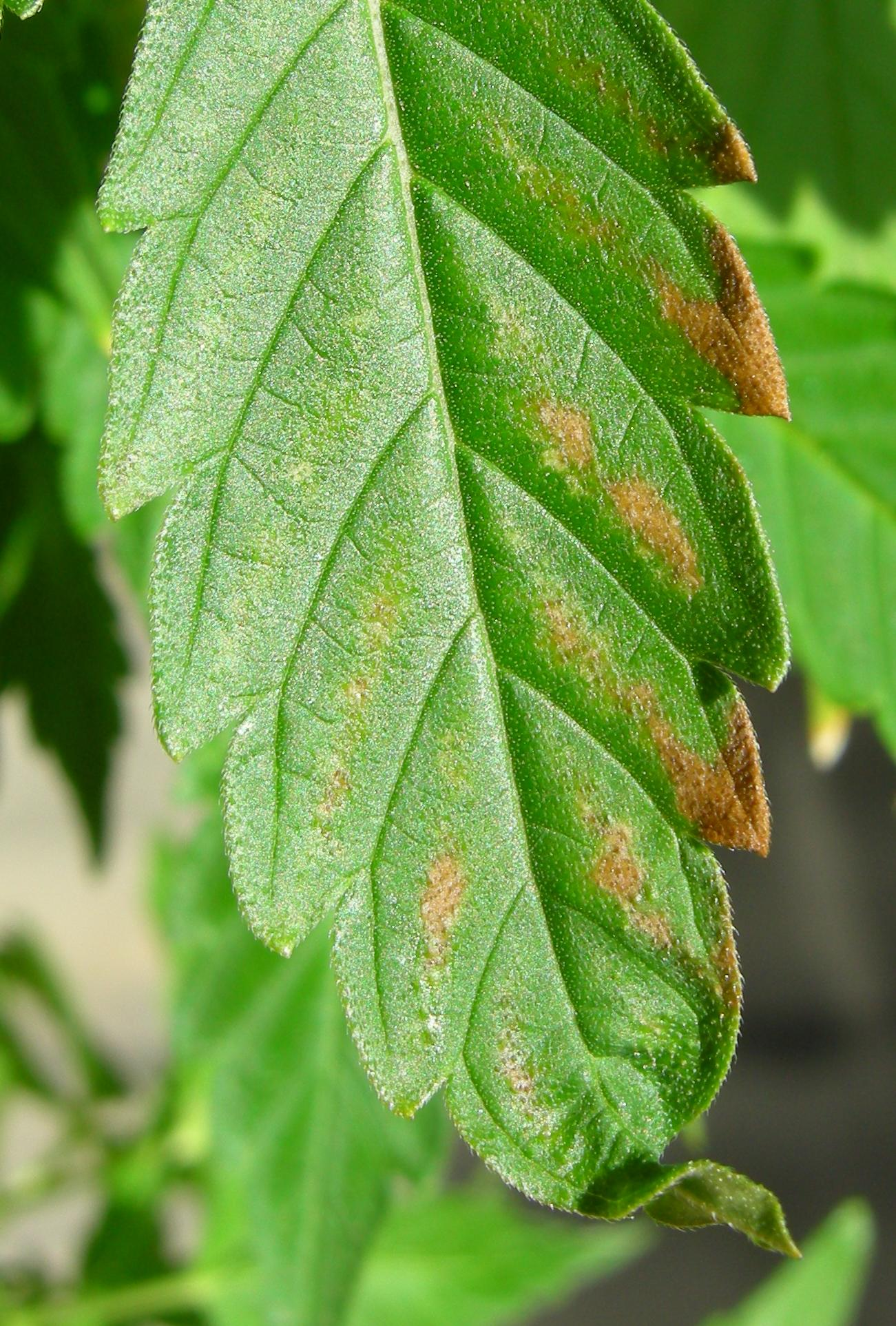
Fertilizer burn on a leaf.

Fertilizer burns occur when the use of too much fertilizer, the wrong type of fertilizer, or too little water with a fertilizer causes damage to a plant. Although fertilizer is used to help a plant grow by providing nutrients, too much will result in excess salt, nitrogen, or ammonia which have adverse effects on a plant. An excess of these nutrients can damage the plant's ability to photosynthesize and cellularly respire, causing visible burns. The intensity of burns determine the strategy for recovery.

== Background ==
Fertilizers contain nutrients that increase plant growth by increasing the rate of photosynthesis (the process in which plants uptake water and nutrients to create sugar) and cellular respiration (the process in which carbon dioxide and sugar is broken down to be used as energy, releasing oxygen). Nutrients and water enter the plant through the plants’ root cell membranes (the barrier separating the inside of the root cells from the outside) via osmosis (the movement of water and small nutrients through a membrane to equalize the concentration of a substance on each side of the membrane). Fertilizer burns occur when the use of fertilizers inhibit the above processes from working correctly and damage the plant.

== Salt index and effects ==
Fertilizers contain differing salt concentrations which alter their 'salt index.' A salt index measures the relative change in osmotic pressure in water after a given salt has been added compared to sodium nitrate, which is assigned a value of 100. Salt indexes can have some relation to the rate of fertilizer burn in plants, with fertilizers of a salt index above 20 not being recommended for use with particularly sensitive crops.

Below is a chart of salt indexes and percent nitrogen of some of the most commonly used fertilizers.

Salt Indexes and % N of Commonly Used Fertilizers
Material	Approximate % N	Salt Index
Urea	46%	74.4
Urea- Ammonium sulfate solution	28-32%	63.0
Diammonium phosphate	18%	29.2
Potassium chloride	0%	116.2

An abundance of nitrogen can cause fertilizer burns. The concentration of nitrogen in a plant is important in terms of avoiding fertilizer burns.

The salt index of fertilizer can change the osmotic pressure, allowing the plant to absorb more or less water and nutrients. When a fertilizer has a high salt concentration, it will have a high salt index and vice versa for a low salt concentration. A correct salt index (in terms of the given plant and fertilizer) will result in high osmotic pressure. The incorrect salt concentration will result in low osmotic pressure, which can cause a fertilizer burn.

=== High Osmotic Pressure ===
High osmotic pressure is when there is a higher concentration of salts inside the root cell membrane, so water moves through the membrane to equalize the concentration, bringing nutrients across the membrane as well. The rate of photosynthesis and cellular respiration will increase. When there is a high osmotic pressure, fertilizer is working correctly.

=== Low Osmotic Pressure ===
Low osmotic pressure is when there is a higher concentration of salts outside the root cell membrane, so water will not move across the membrane. Water may even leave the root system in an attempt to equalize the concentration of salts in the soil. When there is a low osmotic pressure, the fertilizer is working incorrectly and the plant may experience a fertilizer burn.

== Causes and pathophysiology ==
Fertilizer burns are caused by adding too much salt and or nutrients to the soil surrounding a plant. Dry, overheated, and sunburnt plants are most susceptible to fertilizer burns. There are five ways that the use of fertilizer could cause burns.

1. Use of too much fertilizer of the correct salt index. This causes a buildup of salts and nutrients in the soil and thus a fertilizer burn from low osmotic pressure.
2. Use of a fertilizer with too high of a salt index. This will cause a buildup of salt and nutrients in the soil and thus a fertilizer burn from low osmotic pressure.
3. Use of a fertilizer of the correct salt index but too little water. This will cause a fertilizer burn by starving the plant from water.
4. Use of a fertilizer that contains too much nitrogen. This will affect the cellular respiration of a plant, causing a fertilizer burn.
5. Use of a fertilizer that produces or has excess ammonia. The ammonia pulls water from the roots. The plant will respond as it does in a drought and this will cause a fertilizer burn by starving the plant from water.

Each of these five causes can be grouped into one of three explanations of the fertilizer burns:

=== Fertilizer burns due to low osmotic pressure. ===
With water not entering the plant, the plant will respond as it does in a drought. The plant will not photosynthesize, inhibiting sugar production, cellular respiration, and plant growth resulting in direct damage - a fertilizer burn.

=== Fertilizer burns due to too little water. ===
When too little water accompanies the high concentration of salts in fertilizer, the salts will absorb some of the water, leaving very little for the plant. The plant will respond as it would in a drought. The plant will not photosynthesize or cellularly respire, resulting in a fertilizer burn.

=== Fertilizer burns due to too much nitrogen. ===
Too much nitrogen can stop the production and accumulation of carbohydrates, inhibiting cellular respiration. Without cellular respiration, the plant's function will decline. Root rot may occur, during which the roots may incorrectly absorb nutrients and water, as the harmful nutrients are more likely to be absorbed. The lower leaves on the plant may die, and the rest of the plant will start to decline in function, portraying the fertilizer burn.

== Signs and symptoms ==
The beginning signs of fertilizer burn include white salt marks and crust in the plant container and/or around the roots. The salt marks portray that there is an excess of salt and a buildup in the soil. When fertilizer burns continue,

1. The leaves of the plant will turn brown and die.
2. The root growth will stop.
3. The roots may turn brown indicating root rot.

== Treatment ==
Recovery from fertilizer burns depends on the severity and the cause.

1. If a plant is burnt due to high salt concentration, there may be white marks and crusts around the plant (easily identifiable in potted plants). There are two options in terms of recovery.
  1. Remove the plant and its roots from the pot, carefully clean the roots and repot the plant. Fertilizer can be reintroduced slowly to allow for slow, healthy recovery.
  2. Water the plant heavily to wash the accumulation of salt away.
2. If a plant is burnt due to drought-like circumstances, the soil may be dry, and the plant will appear wilted. The best option in terms of recovery is to water the plant with more water, maintaining damp soil. Stop fertilizer usage until the plant is hydrated.
3. If a plant is burnt due to an abundance of nitrogen or ammonia, stop fertilizer usage and continue to water. If there is severe root rot, the function may not be able to recover and the plant may die.

== See also ==
- Abiotic stress
- Bacterial leaf scorch
- Biotic stress
- Chlorosis
- Fertilizer
- Leaf scorch
- Ozone
- Soil salinity
