= Crotonylidene diurea =

Names
- IUPAC name (6-methyl-2-oxo-1,3-diazinan-4-yl)urea
- Other names Crotodur, N-(hexahydro-6-methyl-2-oxo-4-pyrimidinyl)urea, Floranit

Identifiers
CAS Number	1129-42-6
3D model (JSmol)	Interactive image
ChemSpider	86174
EC Number	214-447-6
PubChem CID	95479
CompTox Dashboard (EPA)	DTXSID00883658
- InChI: InChI=1S/C6H12N4O2/c1-3-2-4(9-5(7)11)10-6(12)8-3/h3-4H,2H2,1H3,(H3,7,9,11)(H2,8,10,12) Key: CZAUMIGWDFREBR-UHFFFAOYSA-N
- SMILES: CC1CC(NC(=O)N1)NC(=O)N

Properties
Chemical formula	C_{6}H_{12}N_{4}O_{2}
Molar mass	172.188 g·mol^{−1}
Appearance	white solid
Melting point	250 °C (482 °F; 523 K)
- Except where otherwise noted, data are given for materials in their standard state (at 25 °C [77 °F], 100 kPa). Infobox references

Crotonylidene diurea (CDU) is an organic compound formed by the condensation of crotonaldehyde with two equivalents of urea. It is a white, water-soluble solid. CDU is a component of some controlled-release fertilizers.
