= Urea-formaldehyde =

Nontransparent thermosetting polymer

Urea-formaldehyde (UF), also known as urea-methanal, so named for its common synthesis pathway and overall structure, is a nontransparent thermosetting polymer. It is produced from urea and formaldehyde. These resins are used in adhesives, plywood, particle board, medium-density fibreboard (MDF), and molded objects. In agriculture, urea-formaldehyde compounds are one of the most commonly used types of slow-release fertilizer.

== History ==
UF was first synthesized in 1884 by Dr Hölzer, who was working with Bernhard Tollens, neither of whom realized that the urea and formaldehyde were polymerizing.

In the following years a large number of authors worked on the structure of these resins.

In 1896, Carl Goldschmidt investigated the reaction further. He also obtained an amorphous, almost insoluble precipitate, but he did not realize that polymerization was occurring; he thought that two molecules of urea were combining with three molecules of formaldehyde. In 1897 Carl Goldschmidt patented the use of UF-resins as a disinfectant. General commercialisation followed this and in the following decades, more and more applications were described in the literature.

In 1919, Hanns John (1891–1942) of Prague, Czechoslovakia, obtained the first patent for UF resin in Austria.

Urea-formaldehyde was object matter of judgment via the European Court of Justice (now CJEU) of 5 February 1963, Case 26–62 Van Gend & Loos v Netherlands Inland Revenue Administration.

== Properties ==
Urea-formaldehyde is widely utilized due to its inexpensive cost, quick reaction time, high bonding strength, moisture resistance, lack of color, and resistance to abrasion and microbes. Urea-formaldehyde resin's attributes include high tensile strength, flexural modulus, high heat-distortion temperature, low water absorption, mould shrinkage, high surface hardness, elongation at break, and volume resistance. It has a refractive index of 1.55.

== Production and structure ==
Two steps in formation of urea-formaldehyde resin

The chemical structure of UF polymer consists of [(O)CNHCH_{2}NH]_{n} repeat units. In contrast, melamine-formaldehyde resins feature NCH_{2}OCH_{2}N repeat units. Depending on the polymerization conditions, some branching can occur. Early stages in the reaction of formaldehyde and urea produce bis(hydroxymethyl)urea.

About 20 million metric tons of UF are produced annually.

== Uses ==
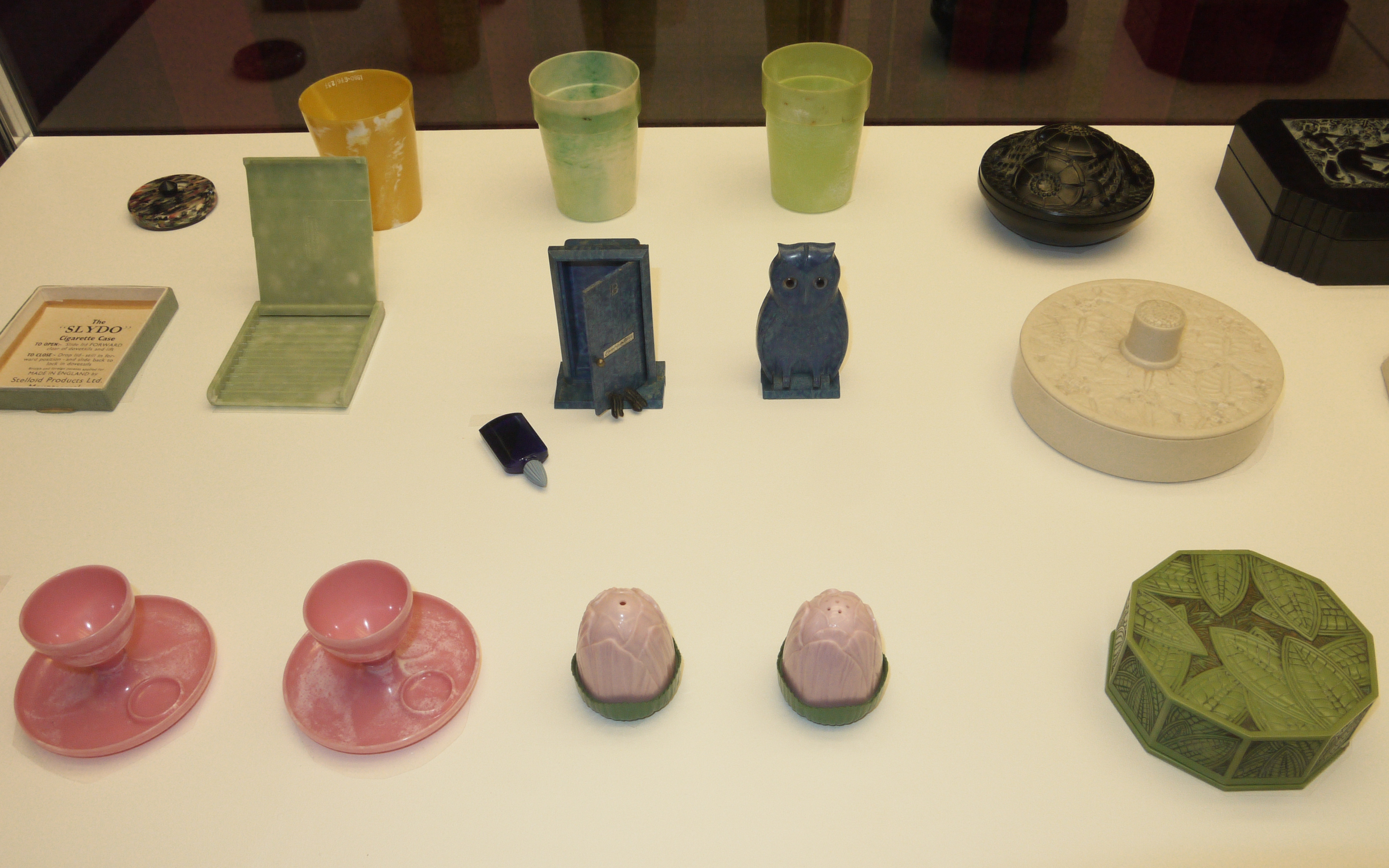
A range of objects made from UF

=== Particle board, etc. ===
Over 70% of this production is then put into use by the forest-products industry for bonding particleboard, MDF, hardwood plywood, and laminating adhesive.

=== Agricultural use ===
Urea-formaldehyde compounds are a widely used as slow-release sources of nitrogen in agriculture. The rate of decomposition into CO_{2} and NH_{3} depends on the length of the urea-formaldehyde chains and it relies on the action of microbes found naturally in most soils. The activity of these microbes, and the rate of ammonia release, is temperature-dependent. The optimum temperature for microbe activity is around 70–90 °F (21–32 °C).

=== Foam insulation ===
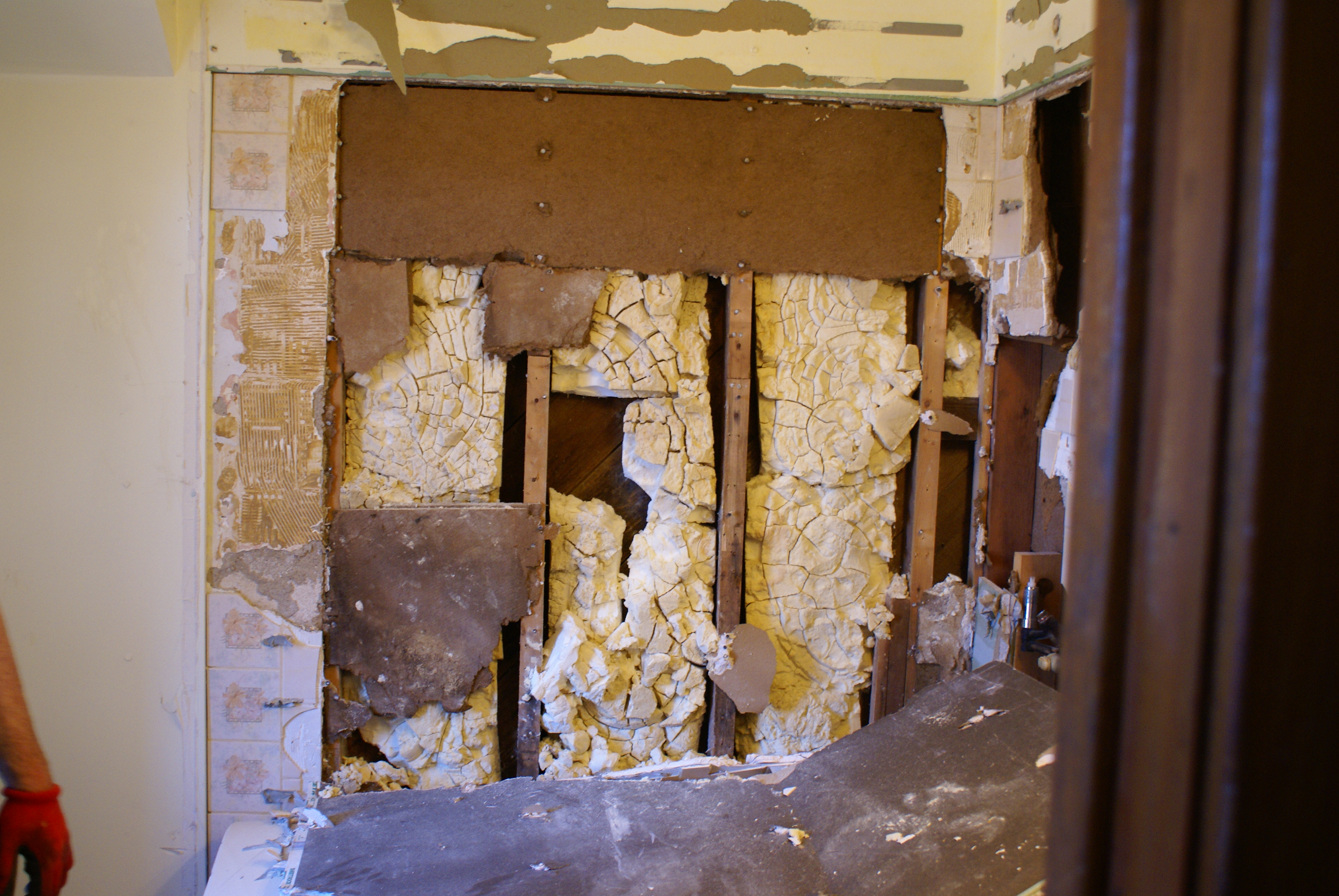
Urea-formaldehyde insulation

Urea-formaldehyde foam insulation (UFFI) commercialisation dates to the 1930s as a synthetic insulation with thermal conductivity of 0.0343 to 0.0373 W/m⋅K, equating to U values for 50 mm thickness of between 0.686 W/m^{2}K and 0.746 W/m^{2}K or R-values between 1.46 m^{2}K/W and 1.34 m^{2}K/W (0.26 °F⋅ft^{2}⋅h/BTU and 0.24 °F⋅ft^{2}⋅h/BTU for 1.97-inch thickness).

UFFI is a foam with similar consistency to shaving cream, that is easily injected or pumped into voids. It is normally made on site using a pump set and hose with a mixing gun to mix the foaming agent, resin, and compressed air. The fully expanded foam is pumped into areas in need of insulation. It becomes firm within minutes, but cures within a week. UFFI is generally found in homes built or retrofitted from the 1930s to the 1970s, often in basements, wall cavities, crawl spaces and attics. Visually, it looks like oozing liquid that has been hardened. Over time, it tends to vary in shades of butterscotch, but new UFFI is a light yellow colour. Early forms of UFFI tended to shrink significantly. Modern UF insulation with updated catalysts and foaming technology have reduced shrinkage to minimal levels (between 2 and 4%). The foam dries with a dull matte colour with no shine. When cured, it often has a dry and crumbly texture.

=== Niche ===
Other uses include decorative laminates, textiles, paper, foundry sand molds, wrinkle-resistant fabrics, cotton blends, rayon, corduroy, etc. It is also used as wood glue. In the wood industry, it is utilized as a thermosetting adhesive to bond wood to create plywood and particleboard. UF was commonly used when producing electrical appliances casing (e.g. desk lamps). Foams have been used as artificial snow in movies. Urea-formaldehyde is widely used in agriculture as a slow-release fertilizer, which release small amounts of the active ingredient over time. UF and related amino resins are used include in automobile tires to improve the bonding of rubber, in paper for improving tear strength, and in molding electrical devices, jar caps, etc.

== Formaldehyde emissions ==
Emissions from UF-based fertilizer application have been found to temporarily increase localized atmospheric formaldehyde concentration Application of UF fertilizers in greenhouses has been found to cause significantly higher air formaldehyde concentrations within the building.

Environmental conditions, such as temperature and humidity, can impact the levels of formaldehyde released from urea-formaldehyde products. Exposure to higher humidity and higher temperatures can both significantly increase the amount of formaldehyde emissions from UF products, such as wood-based panel boards.

Due to concerns of free formaldehyde emissions and environmental pollution from urea-formaldehyde products, there have been effective efforts to lower the formaldehyde content in UF resins. A lower molar ratio of formaldehyde decreases the emission of free formaldehyde from UF products. There is a significant decrease in formaldehyde emissions from UF-based particleboard from F/U molar ratio of 2.0 to 1.0. The German standard for UF resins require the F/U molar ratio to be below 1.2. The U.S. NPA standard is an F/U molar ratio below 1.3.

== Health concerns ==
Health concerns led to banning of UFFI in the U.S. state of Massachusetts, and Connecticut in 1981. In 1982, the U.S. Consumer Product Safety Commission banned UFFI nationwide, but this ban was reversed in 1983. UFFI was banned in Canada in 1980, which remains in effect.

== See also ==
- Medium-density fibreboard § Safety concerns
- Phenol formaldehyde resin
