= Horace Hagedorn =

American businessman (1915–2005)

- Born: March 18, 1915; Manhattan, New York, US
- Died: January 31, 2005 (aged 89); Sands Point, New York, US
- Education: University of Pennsylvania
- Occupation(s): Advertising executive, businessman, philanthropist
- Years active: 1936–1997
- Known for: Co-Founder of the Miracle-Gro brand
- Spouses: Peggy Hagedorn (died 1984); Amy Maiello (m. 1985)
- Children: 6

Horace Hagedorn (1915–2005) was an advertising executive, businessman and philanthropist, who was co-founder of the Miracle-Gro brand, with Otto Stern. He eventually bought out the 50% interest held by Stern.

== Biography and career ==
Horace Hagedorn was born on March 18, 1915, in Manhattan, New York. He obtained a degree from the University of Pennsylvania in business, later selling radio advertising.

Miracle-Gro, a water-soluble fertilizer, was developed after Hagedorn met nurseryman Otto Stern and learned of Stern's troubles shipping plants in 1944. The pair hired O. Wesley Davidson, a Rutgers University professor to develop the fertilizer. Hagedorn used royalties from producing a crime-drama "The Big Story" to fund the company. In 1950, the company was formed after his wife Peggy named the product. He is largely credited with the success of the company due to the nature of his effective marketing – employing advertisements in differing medias and working with emerging hardware chains. Hagedorn, however, credits being at the right place at the right time for the success of the company. In 1963, he became the company's first full time salesman. In 1995, the company merged with Scotts for $200 million in stock, with Hagedorn as the majority investor. The merger created the world's largest maker of lawn and garden products. He retired from Miracle-Gro in 1997.

Prior to moving to Sands Point, New York, Hagedorn lived in Flower Hill, New York and Plandome Manor, New York.

In later life, Hagedorn donated large sums of money to various charities, particularly those dealing with children. In 2000, he gave $45 million to the Long Island Community Foundation, funded a cleft palate clinic at North Shore University Hospital, and underwrote the Miracle-Gro Kids program.

== Death and legacy ==
Hagedorn died on January 31, 2005, in Sands Point, New York, of pulmonary fibrosis. His second wife, Amy, founded the Hagedorn Foundation in 2005.

The School of Business at Adelphi University and the School of Education at Hofstra University are both named after him; both their buildings are named Hagedorn Hall.
