= Miracid =

Miracid is:

- A brand of fertilizer manufactured by Scotts Miracle-Gro
- A trade name for omeprazole, a proton pump inhibitor
