= The Nature Company =

Chain of retail stores

The Nature Company was a Berkeley, California-based chain of retail stores that sold scientific toys, telescopes, artwork, fossils, minerals and gems, books, clothing, and music CDs.

The Nature Company was founded in 1972 by Priscilla and Tom Wrubel. Starting from its flagship store on El Dorado Avenue Berkeley, it expanded throughout the United States, and had stores in Canada and the United Kingdom. In 1996, it was purchased by Discovery Channel, at a price of $40 million (~$75.7 million in 2025). At the time, it had 114 stores in malls, airports, and on shopping streets. Prior to the sale it was owned by CML Group, the holding company for NordicTrack (fitness equipment), Boston Whaler and Smith & Hawken (gardening equipment).

From 1996 to 2000, approximately 75% of The Nature Co. stores were converted into Discovery Channel stores. By the end of 2001, all of the Nature Co. stores were closed or converted.

Nature Company Stores were recognizable by their stone entranceway arch and water feature, customized to each location. All stores had extravagantly built custom cabinetry to showcase the maps, fossils, minerals and gems that were sold. The original store concept was designed by the San Francisco office of the award-winning retail architect Richard Altuna. Later stores in the chain were designed and rolled out by the San Francisco office of the firm NBBJ.
