= Hawthorne Gardening Company =

- Company type: Subsidiary of The Scotts Miracle-Gro Company
- Industry: Cannabis industry
- Founded: 2014; 12 years ago
- Products: Hydroponic products
- Brands: Gavita; General Hydroponics; Sun System
- Website: hawthorne-gardening.com

Hawthorne Gardening Company, formed in October 2014, is The Scotts Miracle-Gro Company's subsidiary for cannabis growers and one of the first major investments by a major United States corporation in the cannabis industry.

== Background ==
Hawthorne Gardening was created "to meet the demands of hydroponic growers (a.k.a. cannabis growers) ... [it] markets itself [to them] using language that's in line with the free-spirited, artisanal cannabis farmer." The business made its first cannabis-related investment in April 2015, when it bought General Hydroponics, a 35-year old liquid nutrient maker, called by High Times "the standard for hydroponic growers". After the 2015 purchase, a Hawthorne executive told the press, "the lion's share of General Hydroponics business in North America is cannabis growers". Scotts' CEO decided to spin off a cannabis business after a 2013 visit to a garden store in Yakima, Washington with a large section of hydroponic equipment. According to Forbes, Scotts had invested more than $250 million in the subsidiary by mid 2016. In March 2018, the Hawthorne Gardening Company and The Flowr Corporation (a Canadian Licensed Producer of medical cannabis) announced an R&D partnership, building North America's first dedicated facility for cannabis research and development. It is located in Vancouver, Washington.
