= Scotts Miracle-Gro Company =

American multinational corporation

The Scotts Miracle-Gro Company
- Formerly: The O.M. Scott's & Sons Company (1868-1992); The Scotts Company (1992-2005)
- Type: Public
- Traded as: NYSE: SMG; S&P 400 Component
- Industry: Manufacturing
- Predecessor: Stern's Miracle-Gro Products
- Founded: 1868; 158 years ago
- Founder: Orlando Scott
- Headquarters: Marysville, Ohio, U.S.
- Key people: O. M. Scott, Founder; James Hagedorn, CEO and Chairman of the Board; Michael Lukemire, COO and President
- Products: Products for lawn and garden care
- Revenue: ▼US$2.66 billion (2018)
- Net income: ▼US$64 million (2018)
- Number of employees: 6,500
- Website: scottsmiraclegro.com

The Scotts Miracle-Gro Company is an American multinational corporation headquartered in Marysville, Ohio, where O.M. Scott began selling lawn seed in 1868. The company manufactures and sells consumer lawn, garden and pest control products, as well as soilless indoor gardening equipment. In the U.S., the company manufactures Scotts, Miracle-Gro and Ortho brands. It also markets and distributes the herbicide Roundup in the U.S. and several international markets including China.

== History ==
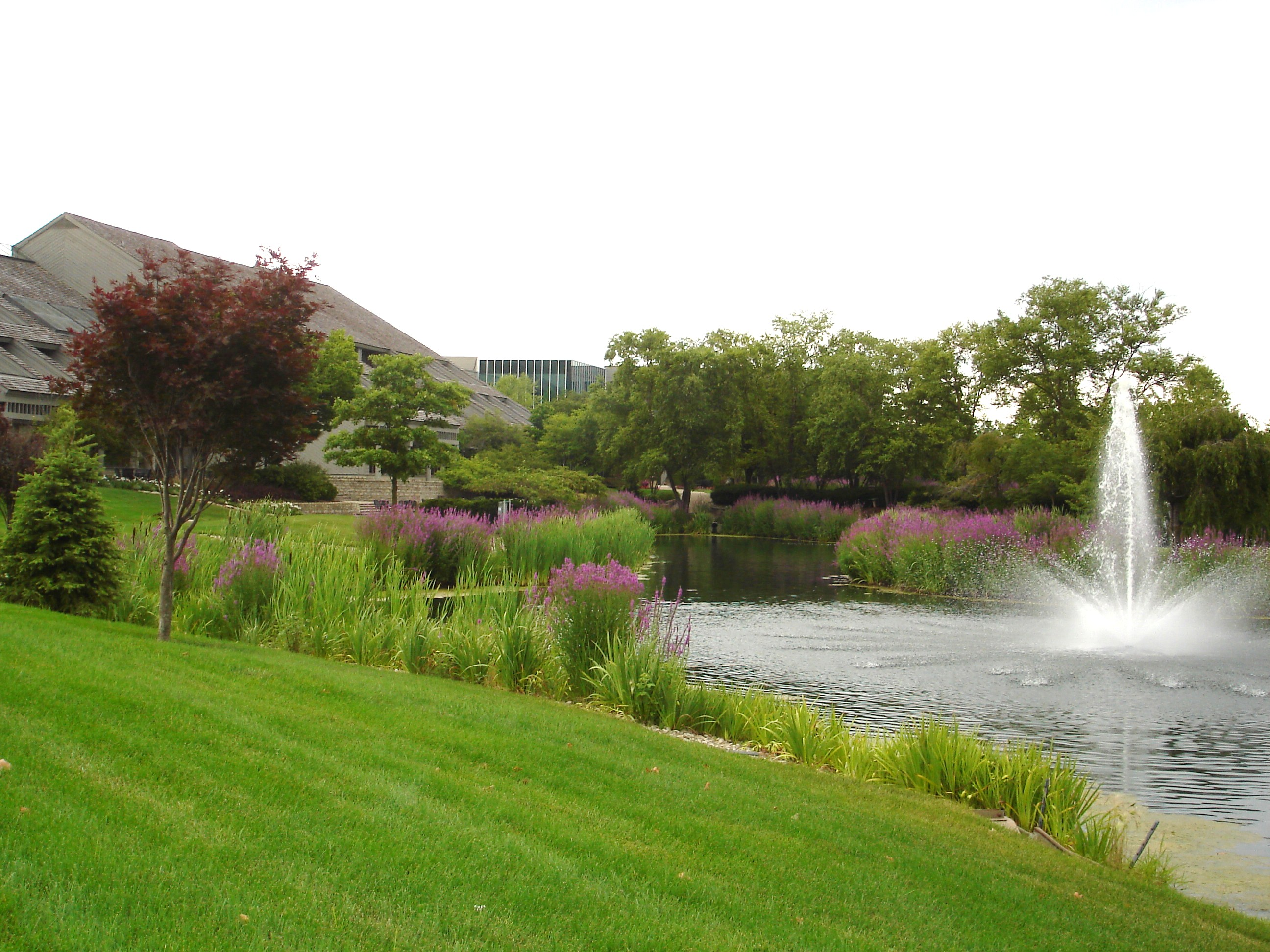
Scotts' headquarters in Marysville

Scotts was founded in 1868 by Orlando M. Scott as a premium seed company for the U.S. agricultural industry. In the early 1900s, the company began a lawn grass seed business for homeowners, and in 1924, became the first company to ship grass seed products directly to stores. Prior to 1924, Scotts products were only available through the mail. By 1940, Scotts's sales had reached $1,000,000 and the company had 66 associates.

In 1971, privately owned O.M. Scott & Sons was purchased by ITT, an international business conglomerate. Fifteen years later, in 1986, Scotts became an independent company again through a leveraged buyout. In 1992, Scotts became a publicly traded company with an initial offering of $19.00 a share and three years later merged with Miracle-Gro, a gardening company, to create the Scotts Miracle-Gro Company.

During the 2012 United States presidential election, the company endorsed the election of Republican Party candidate Mitt Romney.

In June 2026, ScottsMiracle-Gro expanded its partnership with Kinaxis, moving all supply chain planning onto the Kinaxis Maestro platform. The expansion followed a three-year supply chain overhaul in which ScottsMiracle-Gro reduced its inventory from $1.3 billion to $627 million and cut its distribution centre network from 18 to five facilities, achieving $75 million in cost savings in fiscal 2025.

=== Sale of bird seed in 2005–2008 ===
On January 27, 2012, Scotts Miracle-Gro pled guilty in federal court and paid $4.5 million in fines for selling 73 million units of bird seed between November 2005 to March 2008 that was coated with pesticide known to be deadly to birds and fish. Pesticides were added to protect the product from insects during storage, including Storcide II, that was clearly marked as extremely toxic to birds. Records show that Scotts Miracle-Gro's own experts warned of the risk in the summer and fall of 2007 but they continued to sell the product until March 2008. In 2008, Scotts Miracle-Gro also falsified pesticide registration numbers required by the U.S. Environmental Protection Agency on its products.

On September 7, 2012, a federal court ordered Scotts to pay a $4 million fine and perform community service for 11 criminal violations of the Federal Insecticide, Fungicide and Rodenticide Act (FIFRA). In a separate agreement with the Environmental Protection Agency, Scotts agreed to pay more than $6 million in penalties and spend $2 million on environmental projects. According to the Justice Department, both the criminal and civil settlements are the largest under FIFRA to date.

=== GM Grass ===
Scotts has developed several genetically modified grasses, including herbicide-tolerant Kentucky bluegrass and creeping bentgrass. In 2007, the U.S. Department of Agriculture fined Scotts Miracle-Gro $500,000 when DNA from genetically modified creeping bentgrass was found within relative plants of the same genus, (Agrostis), and other native grasses up to 21 km (13 mi) from the test sites.

=== Peat bogs in the UK ===
In 2001, Scotts was involved in a major dispute with nature conservation bodies and the UK Government about the future of several peat bogs in the north of England. Under pressure from the European Union the UK government moved to declare a number of peat bogs, covering an area of 4,097 acres (1,658 ha) in Yorkshire and Cumbria, as Special Areas of Conservation, thus ending Scotts ability to harvest peat for their garden products. During the course of the dispute Nick Kirkbride, the then managing director of Scotts in Britain, described the peat bogs as having "no more conservation interest than a ploughed field". The peat bogs were eventually saved from further destruction by the payment by the UK government of compensation of £17 million to Scotts for loss of the right to extract peat.

=== Lunarly subscription service ===
In July 2018, Scotts collaborated with BuzzFeed Inc. to develop a subscription service called Lunarly, which mails crystals, house plants, and other wellness items based on the lunar calendar. The joint effort with BuzzFeed's Product Labs, facilitated by ad agency MullenLowe U.S., is an attempt to make gardening popular among millennial women, thereby opening up avenues for the 150+ year-old company to make inroads with younger consumers. While reviews of the self-care boxes have been mixed, they have repeatedly sold out with over $1 million in incremental sales as of May 2019.

== Mergers and acquisitions ==
- 1914 – The O.M. Scott & Sons Company was incorporated
- 1992 – Scotts acquired Republic Tool & Manufacturing Company
- 1993 – Scotts acquired the Grace-Sierra Horticultural Products Company
- 1995 – Scotts merged with Miracle-Gro Products, Inc.
- 1997 – Scotts purchases Miracle Care Garden Ltd.
- 1997 – Scotts acquired Emerald Green Lawn Service, which would become Scotts Lawn Service in 1998.
- 1997 – Scotts purchased privately held Levington Horticulture Ltd.
- 1998 – The company acquired 80% ownership of plant breeding company Sanford Scientific, Inc. (SSI).
- 1998 – Scotts acquired Rhône-Poulenc Jardin
- 1998 – Scotts acquired the Shamrock brand of U.K. and Irish peat products from Bord na Mona, Ireland.
- 1998 – Scotts enters into collaboration with the Monsanto Company
- 1998 – Scotts completes an acquisition with ASEF
- 1999 – Scotts completes agreements with Monsanto Company for exclusive U.S., Canada, U.K., France, Germany, and Australia agency and marketing rights to Monsanto's consumer Roundup herbicide products and for the purchase of the Ortho and related lawn and garden businesses.
- 2000 – Scotts acquires Substral. Scotts also purchases Smith & Hawken
- 2005 – Scotts acquires the Morning Song brand
- 2014 – Scotts Miracle-Gro sells wild bird food line to Global Harvest Foods Ltd.
- 2015 – Scotts Miracle-Gro buys General Hydroponics and Vermicrop Organics to move into the marijuana market, under the name Hawthorne Gardening Company
- 2015 – Scotts Lawn Service is merged with ServiceMaster's TruGreen lawn care service
- 2016 – Scotts acquires Blossom, a California manufacturer of Internet enabled sprinkler systems.
- 2016 – Scotts acquires a minority share of Bonnie Plants.
- 2017 – Scotts sells its European and Australian operations and brands to Exponent Private Equity LLP.
- 2017 – Scotts acquires Can-Filters, a Canadian-based carbon filter manufacturer and fan wholesaler under their Hawthorne Gardening Co. brand.
- 2018 – Scotts Miracle-Gro announced its plan to acquire Sunlight Supply Inc., a hydroponics supplier, for $450 million in cash and stock.
- 2019 – Scotts sells its minority stake in TruGreen for $234 million.
- 2020 – Scotts acquires AeroGrow International lnc., a hydroponics maker.
- 2022 – Scotts acquires Luxx Lighting Co., A horticultural lighting maker.
- 2026 – Scotts sells Hawthorne Gardening to Vireo Growth

== Brands ==
=== United States ===
- AeroGrow
- Black Magic
- Blossom
- Botanicare LLC
- Bovung
- Can-Filters
- Earthgro
- Ecoscraps
- Gavita
- General Hydroponics
- Greendigs
- Greenlight
- Hawthorne Gardening Company
- Hyponex
- Lunarly
- Miracle-Gro
- Mother Earth
- Ortho
- Ortho Elementals
- Osmocote
- Scotts
- Scotts Lawn Service
- Supersoil
- TOMCAT
- Vermicrop Organics
- Whitney Farms

=== Outside the U.S. ===
- Gavita Holland B.V.
- Pathclear
- Scotts Ecosense
- Weedol
