= Leaf Color Chart =

Tool used to determine the nitrogen level in rice plants

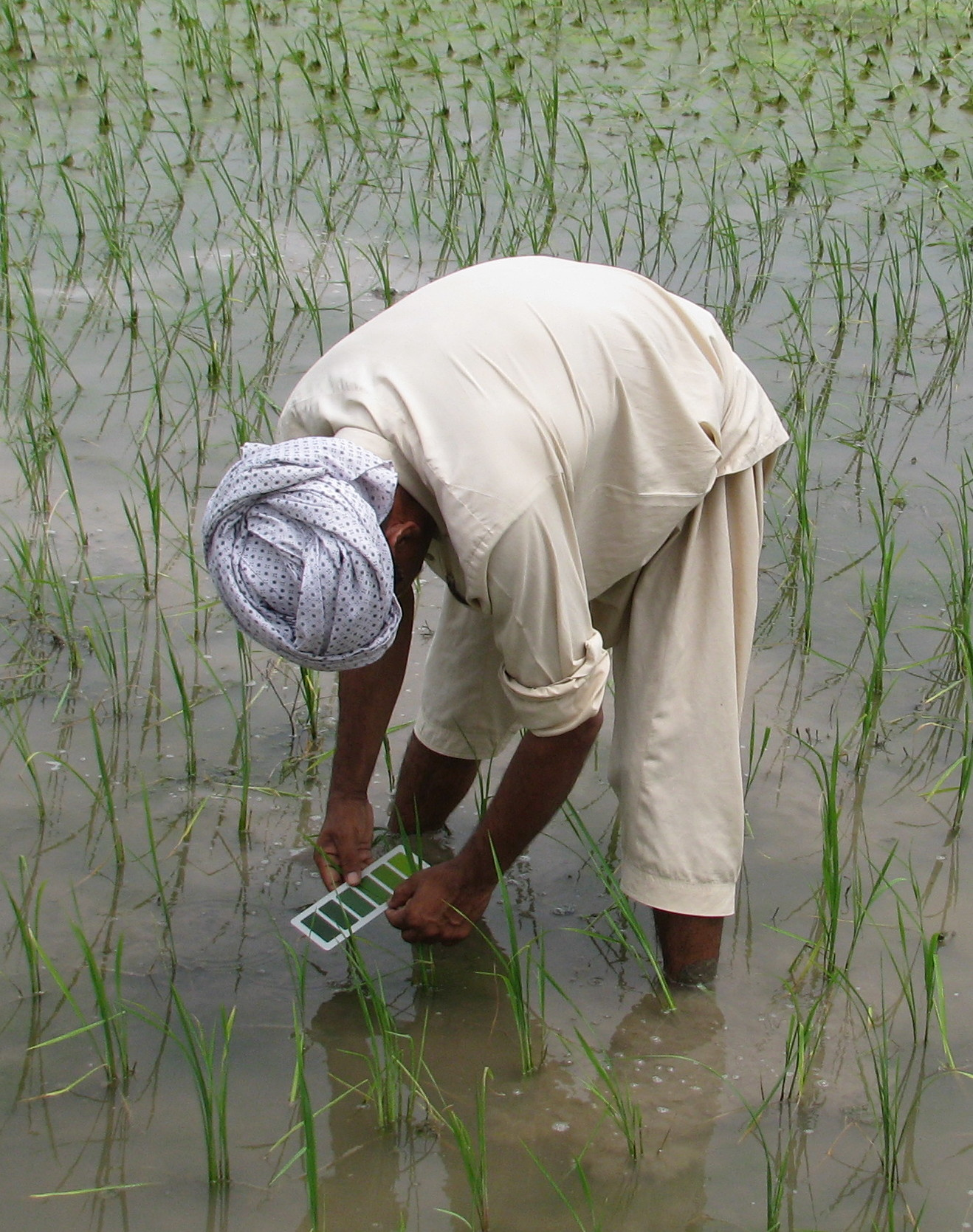
- A farmer in Punjab determining the nitrogen levels in a rice paddy by using a leaf color chart.
- Uses: Diagnosis of nitrogen levels in plants (rice)
- Inventor: International Rice Research Institute

The Leaf Color Chart (LCC) is a diagnostic tool used to determine the nitrogen level in rice plants relative to the shade of green of the plant's leaves. It is a ruler-shaped strip containing at least four panels of color, ranging from yellowish green to dark green. The leaf of the plant is compared with the color panels to determine how much nitrogen fertilizer is needed. It was developed by the International Rice Research Institute (IRRI).

The IRRI with the aid of the University of California Cooperative Extension, standardized the LCC. The standardized version is 12.7 centimetres (5.0 in) long with four panels of colors.
