= TruGreen =

U.S. lawn treatment company

TruGreen Limited Partnership
- Type: Private
- Industry: Lawn care services Pest control Tree care
- Founded: 1969 in Troy, Ohio (as ChemLawn); 1973 in Troy, Michigan (as ChemGreen)
- Headquarters: Memphis, Tennessee
- Key people: Kurt Kane (CEO & President); Ben Dunham (Executive Vice President and CFO); Alyssa Puketza (Senior Vice President & Chief Marketing Officer); Brian Bugara (Senior Vice President and Chief Revenue Officer); Bill Hausbeck (Senior Vice President of Operations); Ayman Taha (Senior Vice President & Chief Information & Digital Officer); Christine Belknap (Senior Vice President and Chief Human Resources Officer); Kevin Mann (Senior Vice President and General Counsel); Shannon Lopez (Vice President)
- Owner: Clayton, Dubilier & Rice
- Website: www.trugreen.com

TruGreen, originally known as ChemLawn and later as TruGreen ChemLawn, is the largest lawn care company in the United States. The company was founded in 1969 and provides lawn care and tree and shrub care treatments on a subscription basis (except in New York where it is by contract basis regarding pest control regulations). The treatments and services include weed killing, moss suppression, pesticides, insect control, disease management, aeration, overseeding, and fertilizing. The company neither offers lawn mowing service or landscaping as a sellable service. Tree and shrub services as well as several insect control programs are offered by TruGreen. The TruGreen brand is also used for lawn services in Canada through a Mississauga, Ontario–based company named Greenlawn Ltd. that does business as TruGreen. The TruGreen brand, under ServiceMaster, also is used in the United Kingdom.

The company's history includes several changes of ownership and the absorption of other lawn servicing operations including ChemGreen (originally founded in 1974) and Scotts LawnService (originally founded as Emerald Green Lawn Service before its purchase in 1997 by the Scotts Miracle-Gro Company).

== History ==
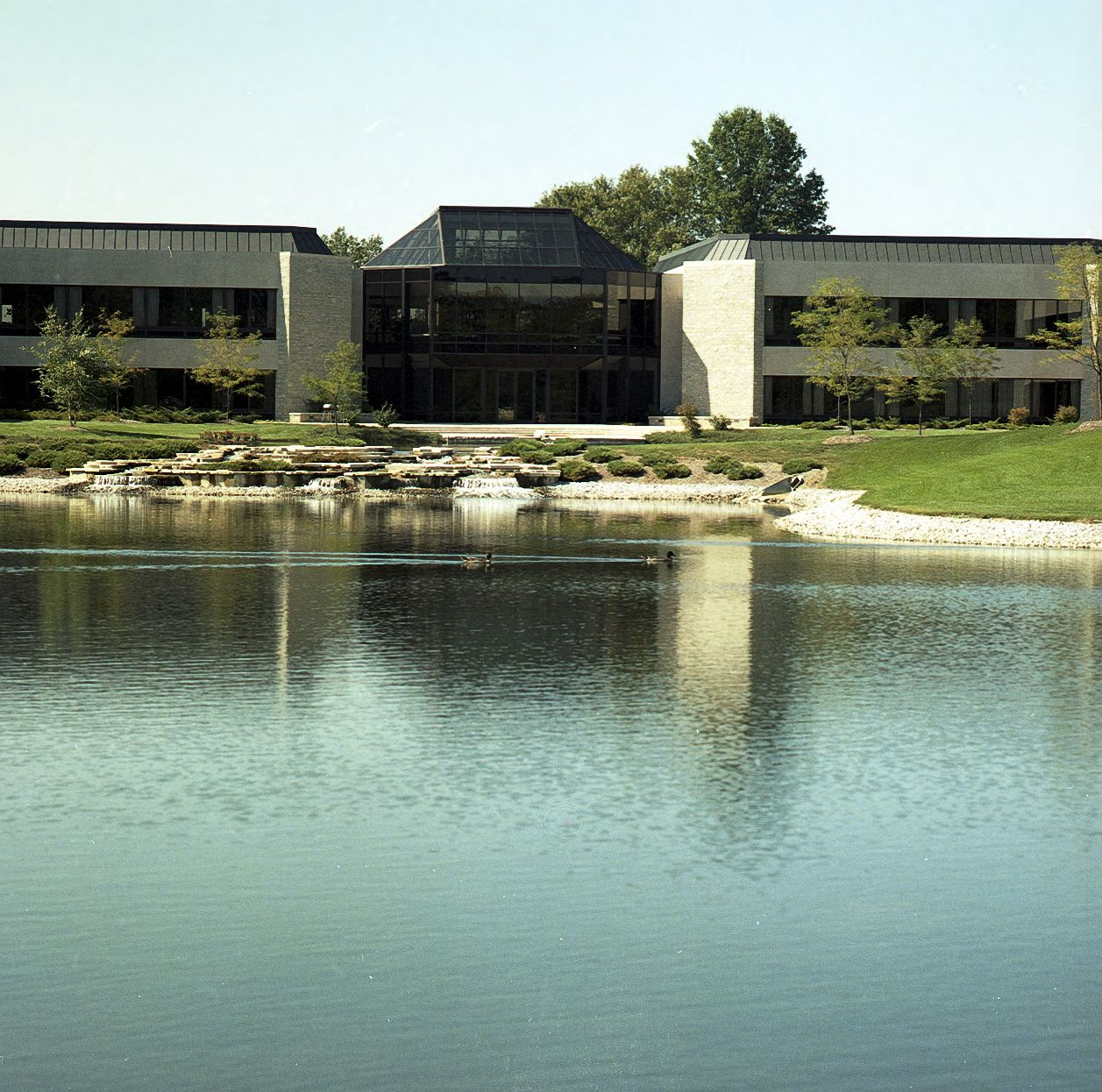
The since-demolished Chemlawn Corporate Center in Columbus, Ohio

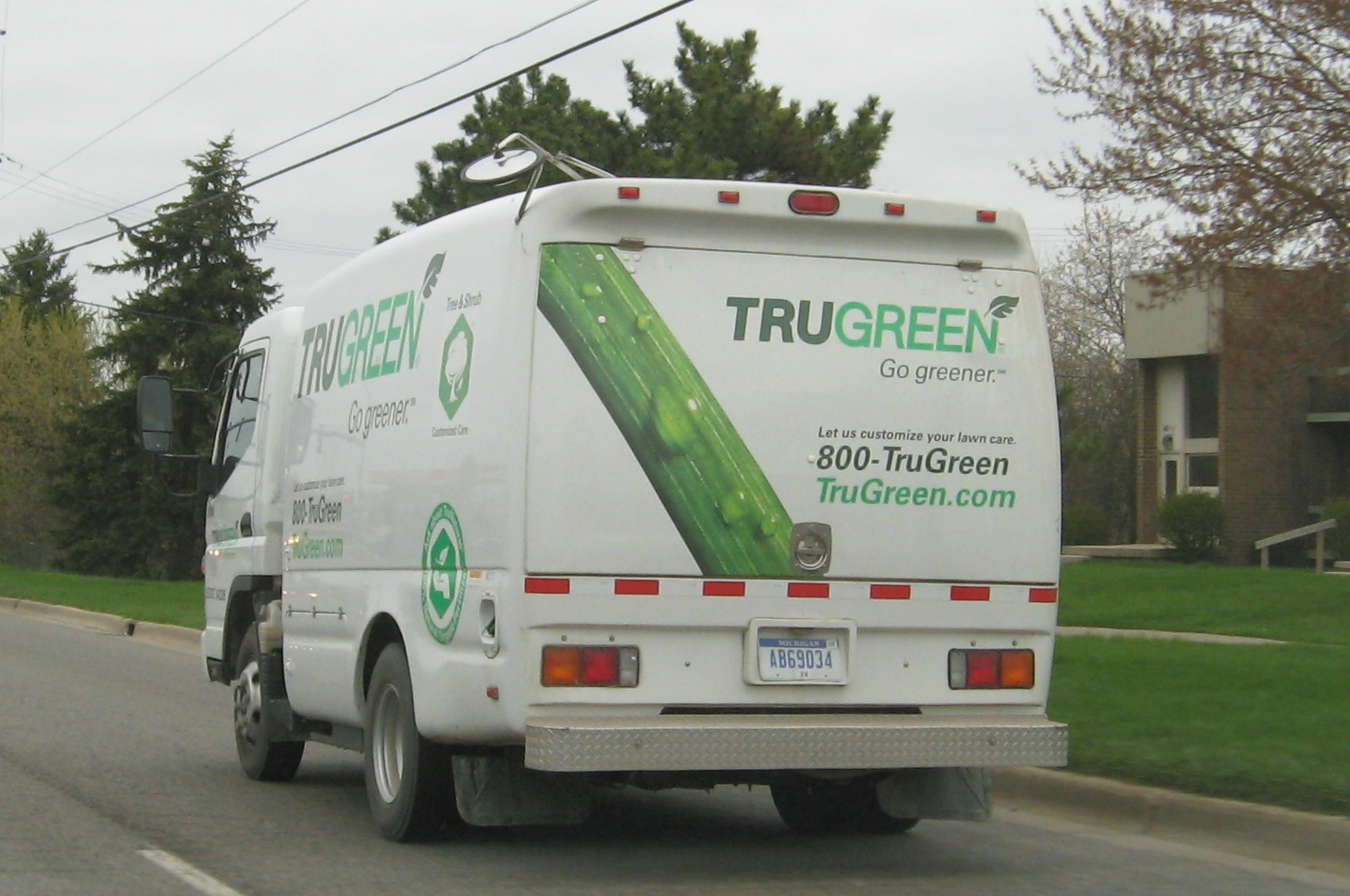
A TruGreen lawn care service van in Pittsfield Township, Michigan

Father and son, Paul and Richard Duke, ran a gardening center called the Duke Garden Centers. They, alongside former garden center employee Thomas Grapner, founded ChemLawn in 1969 in Troy, Ohio, and it became a large service provider in the 1970s.

A separate company called ChemGreen, considered to be the precursor to TruGreen, had been founded in 1973 in Michigan. ServiceMaster also bought ChemGreen in 1992, and rebranded the combination as "TruGreen ChemLawn" and then just as "TruGreen" in 2007, trying to distance the brand from negative perceptions about the intensive use of chemicals and convey a greater sense of environmental responsibility.

The Dukes sold ChemLawn to Ecolab in 1987 for US$376 million, but Ecolab found it was unable to make the operation profitable, and it sold the business to ServiceMaster in 1992 for US$103 million. As part of ServiceMaster, the operational headquarters were moved soon after the acquisition to Memphis, Tennessee, where ServiceMaster was headquartered at the time and where TruGreen remains headquartered today, from Columbus, Ohio, In 1997, Rollins, Inc. sold its Orkin lawn care brand to TruGreen. TruGreen was then spun off as a separate company from ServiceMaster in January 2014. The private equity firm Clayton, Dubilier & Rice had majority ownership along with company management.

In 2024, TruGreen moved its C-suite to Franklin, Tennessee, near Nashville although the headquarters remain in Memphis.

In November 2026, TruGreen was acquired by Canadian private equity firm Birch Hill Equity.

=== Scotts LawnService ===
Scotts LawnService was a subdivision of the Scotts Miracle-Gro Company, an American multinational corporation headquartered in Marysville, Ohio. It was founded with the acquisition of Emerald Green Lawn Care in 1998. It provided lawn, tree, and shrub care and pest control.

In 2002, Scotts LawnService acquired The Lawn Company, a major lawn care service company in the Boston area, and substantially all of the lawn care operations of Centex HomeTeam Services, a division of Centex Corporation.

In April 2016 TruGreen announced that it had merged with Scotts LawnService. After the merger the Scotts brand was no longer used, and Scotts customers no longer received Scotts brand products as part of their lawn treatments; they were instead switched over to products used by TruGreen. The Scotts Miracle-Gro Company retained a 30% stake in the company after the merger, with the option to buy the operations back in the future from TruGreen.

In 2019, Scotts Miracle-Gro sold its 30% minority stake in TruGreen for approximately $234 million. As of February 2023, the lawn servicing operation is marketed as TruGreen, with the Scotts brand basically retired from the lawn servicing business. The Scotts brand remains in use for consumer lawn, garden and pest control products sold by the Scotts Miracle-Gro Company, which is now a separate company.
