= Smith & Hawken =

Garden lifestyle brand

Smith & Hawken was a garden lifestyle brand that operated retail stores, direct mail and e-commerce in the United States. On July 10, 2009, it was announced that all Smith & Hawken stores would cease operation. Smith & Hawken stores were located in upscale retail locations in 22 states.

Smith & Hawken was founded by Dave Smith and Paul Hawken in 1979, originally as a garden tool supplier. Their first retail store opened in 1982 in Mill Valley, California. Smith left the business in 1988. When Hawken retired in 1993, the company was acquired by a retail conglomerate, the CML Group, which sold it to DDJ Capital Management in 1999, after going bankrupt. The company was acquired by Scotts Miracle-Gro for $72 million (~$114 million in 2024) in 2004. At the time of its closure, Smith & Hawken had approximately 700 employees in its stores and the Novato, California, headquarters.

Scotts Miracle-Gro chairman and CEO, Jim Hagedorn, cited the continuing weak economy and "lack of scale" as the primary drivers behind Smith & Hawken's closure. According to Scotts' May 2009 quarterly report, Smith & Hawken net sales were down 22.4% for the first half of fiscal 2009.

Smith & Hawken's founders were reportedly not upset to learn the company they founded 30 years earlier was closing. The San Jose Mercury News reported that Dave Smith and Paul Hawken were relieved by the announcement, stating that "Scotts couldn't have been a worse corporate owner." Smith said he asked friends not to shop there after Scotts purchased the company in 2004.

On January 8, 2010, Target Corporation announced it acquired the Smith & Hawken brand.
