= Miracle-Gro =

Garden products brand

- Product type: Garden supplies
- Current owner: Scotts Miracle-Gro Company
- Country: USA
- Registered as a trademark in: UK 2001
- Website: www.miracle-gro.com

Miracle-Gro usually refers to a garden product brand owned by Scotts Miracle-Gro Company

== History ==
Miracle-Gro, a water-soluble fertilizer, was developed after Horace Hagedorn met nurseryman Otto Stern and learned of Stern's troubles shipping plants in 1944. They hired O. Wesley Davidson, a Rutgers University professor, to develop the fertilizer. In 1950, the company was formed after Hagedorn's wife Peggy named the product. Hagedorn is largely credited with the company's success due to his effective marketing – employing advertisements in various media and working with emerging hardware chains. However, he maintained the company was "in the right place at the right time". In 1963, he became the company's first full-time salesman. He bought out Stern in the 1980s.

In 1995, the company merged with Scotts for $200 million in stock, creating the world's largest maker of lawn and garden products, and making Hagedorn the majority investor with 42% of the company and 3 of 11 board seats. Hagedorn's son Jim became CEO and chairman of the merged company. His father retired from Miracle-Gro in 1997.

Co-founder Otto Stern was the uncle of noted historian Fritz Stern. In The Five Germanys I Have Known, Fritz Stern mentions his "very rich cousin Otto, who invented Miracle-Gro".

== See also ==
- Fertilizer
