= Nutritional value =

Ratio of essential nutrients

Nutritional value or nutritive value as part of food quality is the measure of a well-balanced ratio of the essential nutrients carbohydrates, fat, protein, minerals, and vitamins in items of food or diet concerning the nutrient requirements of their consumer. Several nutritional rating systems and nutrition facts label have been implemented to rank food in terms of its nutritional value. International and national guidelines exist to inform consumers about optimal nutrient intake from their diets.

On a biological scale, nutritive value of food may vary for different health conditions (leading to dietary recommendations and particular diet foods), seasonal differences, age, sexual differences, and interspecies or taxonomic differences.
