= Liming (soil) =

Application of minerals to soil

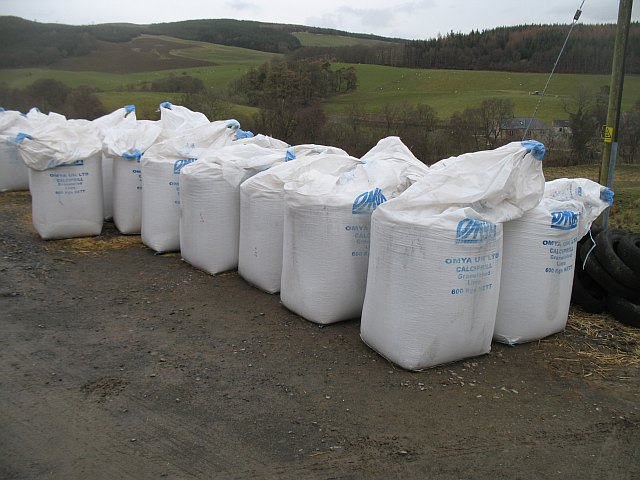
Prepared agricultural lime staged near a field in the UK

Liming is the application of calcium- (Ca) and magnesium (Mg)-rich materials in various forms, including marl, chalk, limestone, burnt lime or hydrated lime to soil. In acid soils, these materials react as a base and neutralize soil acidity. This often improves plant growth and increases the activity of soil bacteria, but oversupply may result in harm to plant life. Modern liming was preceded by marling, a process of spreading raw chalk and lime debris across soil, in an attempt to modify pH or aggregate size. Evidence of these practices dates to the 1200's and the earliest examples are taken from the modern British Isles.

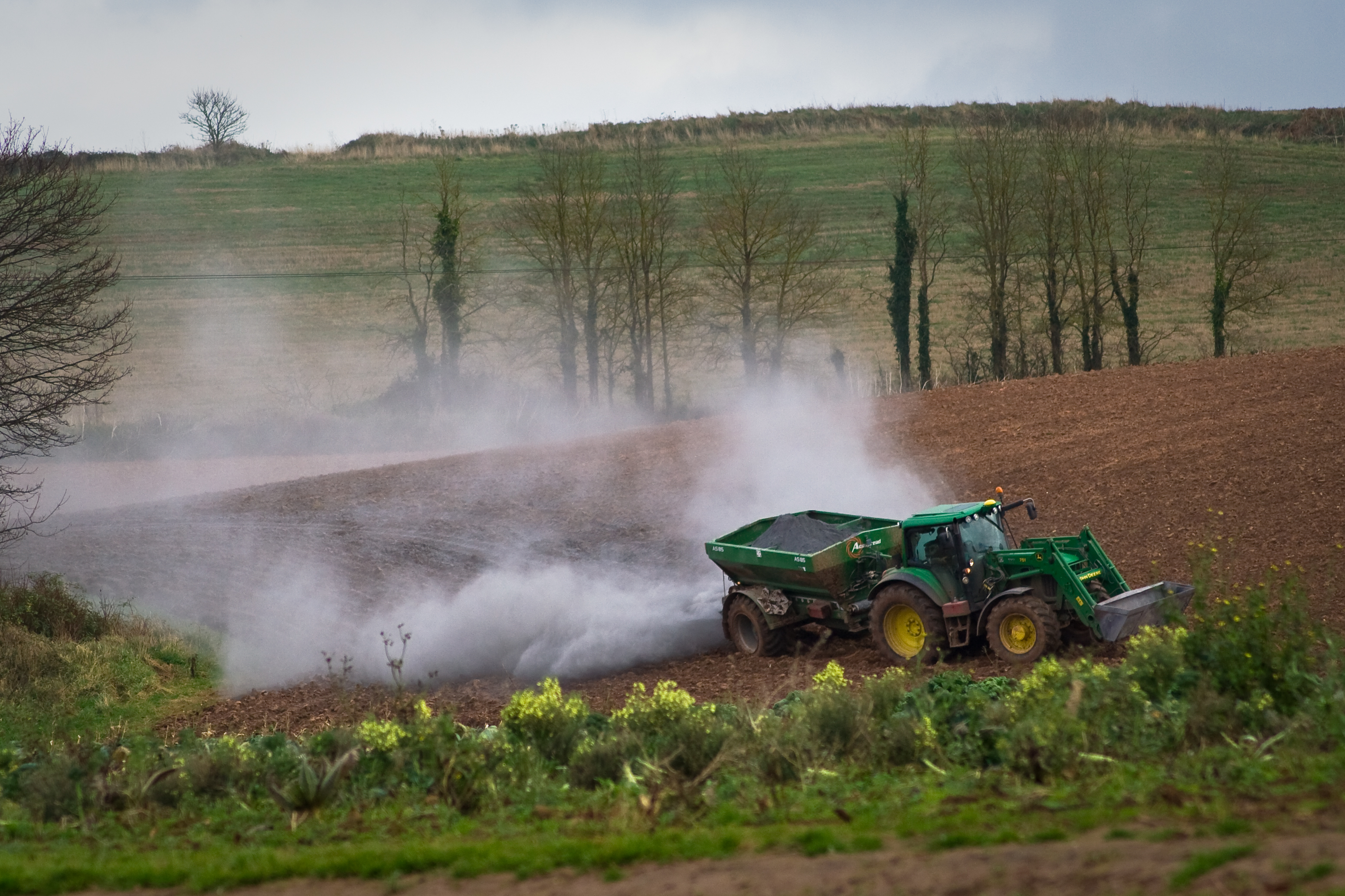
Liming of a field in Devon

== Impact on soil properties ==
Liming can also improve aggregate stability on clay soils. For this purpose structure lime, products containing calcium oxide (CaO) or hydroxide (Ca(OH)_{2}) in mixes with calcium carbonate (CaCO_{3}), are often used. Structure liming can reduce losses of clay and nutrients from soil aggregates. The degree to which a given amount of lime per unit of soil volume will increase soil pH depends on the buffer capacity of the soil (this is generally related to soil cation exchange capacity or CEC).

Most acid soils are saturated with aluminum rather than hydrogen ions. Soil acidity generally results from hydrolysis of aluminum. This concept of "corrected lime potential" to define the degree of base saturation in soils became the basis for procedures now used in soil testing laboratories to determine the "lime requirement" of soils.

Soils with low CEC will usually show a more marked pH increase than soils with high CEC. But the low-CEC soils will witness more rapid leaching of the added bases, and so will see a quicker return to original acidity unless additional liming is done. Over-liming is most likely to occur on soil that has low CEC, such as sand which is deficient in buffering agents such as organic matter and clay.

=== Effect on soil organic carbon ===
The net effect of soil liming on soil organic carbon is primarily the result of three processes.

1. Increased plant productivity resulting in larger organic matter inputs. As soil liming ameliorates soil conditions that inhibit plant growth, an increase in plant productivity is expected. The higher yields resulting from lime applications will produce increased returns of organic matter to the soil in the form of dying roots and decaying crop residue.
2. Increased organic matter mineralization due to a more favorable pH. Lime applications are known to have short-term stimulating effects on soil biological activity, thus favoring organic matter mineralization and very likely accelerating organic matter turnover rates in soil.
3. Amelioration of soil structure leading to a reduction of mineralization by means of protecting soil organic carbon. Liming is known to ameliorate soil structure, as high Ca^{2+} concentrations and high ionic strength in the soil solution enhance the flocculation of clay minerals and, in turn, form more stable soil aggregates.

An agricultural study at the Faculty of Forestry in Freising, Germany, that compared tree stocks two and twenty years after liming found that liming promotes nitrate leaching and decreases the phosphorus content of some leaves.

== See also ==
- Alkali soils
- Soil conservation
- Soil pH
- Agricultural lime
- Aluminum
