= Teeing area =

Starting area of a golf hole

- A golfer playing golf from a teeing area, with red and white tee markers visible
- Other names: Tee, tee box

Characteristics
- Type: Golf
- Equipment: Golf tee, Golf ball, Golf clubs
- Venue: Golf course
- Glossary: Glossary of golf

Presence
- Country or region: Worldwide

The teeing area (also called tee box, teeing ground, or simply tee) is the area where play begins on a hole of golf.

The teeing area is a rectangle two golf club lengths deep. Its front edge is defined by an imaginary line between the forward-most points of two tee markers. A golfer must play the ball from within this area when starting a hole. The golfer is allowed to stand inside or outside of the area as long as the ball is in the area.

The earliest known written rules of golf were published in 1744. They required players to tee their golf balls within one club-length of the previous hole. Over the following century, the permitted distance increased, anywhere from eight and twelve club-lengths by 1875. That year, Old Tom Morris introduced a separate teeing areas to Old Course at St Andrews. By 1888, the R&A rules were akin to what is used today.

It is common for golf courses and country clubs to have multiple tee markers set at different distances. This allows the golfers to play on a golf course with different lengths and levels of challenge. The markers are used to define the boundaries of the teeing area. They can be any object that is placed by the course management.

== History ==
The earliest known written rules of golf, titled Articles & Laws in Playing at Golf, were drafted in 1744 by the Gentlemen Golfers of Leith for a new competition at Leith Links in Edinburgh. The rules, commonly known as the Thirteen Articles, required players to tee their balls within one club-length of the hole. Players therefore began each hole near the previous hole rather than from a separate, designated area. Many of these areas were within a circle. The signature of John Rattray, who held the title 'Captain of the Golf' at the time, appears at the end of the Articles, preserved in the minute book of the Honourable Company of Edinburgh Golfers.

Successive golf clubs adopted different distances for the teeing ground. Bruntsfield Links in 1773, and the Company of Golfers in 1809 specified a distance of two to four club lengths from the hole. St Andrews Links first specified between one and four club lengths in 1777, before adopting the two-to-four-club-length range in 1812. In 1786, Crail allowed teeing within three club lengths, while other courses such as Perth in 1825, had between six and ten club lengths.

The R&A rules set the distance at four to six club lengths in 1851, increasing it to six to eight in 1858. In 1875, the R&A extended the permitted distance to between eight and twelve club lengths, while also allowing specially marked ground to serve as the teeing ground. That year, Old Tom Morris introduced separate teeing areas at Old Course at St Andrews. By 1888, the rules described a layout similar to the modern teeing area.

By the 1890s, golf courses in the United States had begun to construct teeing areas that were level boxes. These boxes were made from wood, stone, or cement, and were often filled with sand, soil, dirt, bitumen, cement, and sometimes covered with coir. Grass teeing areas were also used, later becoming common on championship and private clubs. Today most use grass; most of these older-style teeing boxes would go out of fashion.

In a 1636 Latin textbook, David Wedderburn included the phrase "Statumina pilam arena", meaning "Teaz [tee up] your Ball on the sand", in a section on golf wording from the Early Scots. The 1888 rules of The Royal and Ancient Golf Club of St Andrews referred to the starting place as the "teeing-ground". The term was associated with the Scottish word ''tigh'', meaning "home" and is pronounced tee. The R&A (spun off from The Royal and Ancient Golf Club of St Andrews in 2004) and the United States Golf Association (USGA) both call it a teeing area.

== Tee markers ==
Tee markers were referenced as early as 1781, when the Aberdeen Journal referred to a "golf stone". Modern tee markers are often distinguished by color, although colors vary between courses. White and blue have traditionally been used with tees furthest from the hole, also known as "medal" or tournament tees. Red has been used for the forward tees.

Forward tees were often historically called ladies' tees. This terminology has increasingly been replaced by gender neutral terms based on distance or tee position. Championship/Back/Tip Tees and "Tiger" tees are sometimes used for the furthest tees on the course.

Green teeing area markers at the County Sligo Golf Club, Rosses Point, Ireland.

Associations between tee colors and golfer types in 2021.
Color	Most prominent association(s)	No association
Orange	Younger golfers (9%)	73%
Green	Older golfers (19%)	51%
Gray/Silver	Older golfers (32%)	50%
Yellow/Gold	Older golfers (43%)	28%
Blue	Men (46%); experts (33%)	21%
Black	Experts (69%); men (22%)	22%
White	Men (64%)	19%
Red	Women (76%)	18%

=== Course ratings and handicaps ===
The choice of teeing area is generally left to the player, though may be determined by the course. Different sets of tees may have separate Course Rating and Slope Rating values.

The Course Rating represents the expected score of a scratch golfer. The Slope Rating represents the relative difficulty of the golf course for a bogey golfer when compared with a scratch golfer. Since the tee markers are at different locations, each set of tee markers has its own Course Rating and Slope Rating. These values are used in the World Handicap System. At many clubs, the head professional or starter will ask about a golfer's ability and recommend the most suitable set of tees. This is done to improve the pace of play in a given round of golf.

== Layout and boundaries ==
The teeing area is a rectangle that is made two club-lengths deep, is measured from the two teeing markers, while the sides extend backward from the markers. The area is measured using the longest club carried in the golf bag other than a putter.

The teeing area is the start of any golf hole; the hole starts when the player sets their golf ball within the area. The ball must be within the teeing area, when making one's swing, a player is allowed to stand outside the teeing area as long as the ball is within the teeing area..The ball can be placed on a golf tee or directly on the ground. Playing the ball from outside the teeing area results in a penalty; the type of penalty depends on the format of play.

=== Construction and maintenance ===
Teeing areas can use a variety of surfaces, the most common being artificial mats or grass. On grass tees, course-maintenance staff may move the tee markers periodically. This is to allow the grass to recover, as divots can damage the surface. These divots can be repaired with sand, soil, seed, or fertilizer.

== Golf tee ==
A golf tee is a small peg with a rounded top. The tee is used to raise the golf ball above the ground for the first stroke of a hole. Under standard rules of golf, a golf ball can only be teed off at the beginning of a hole. Tees are commonly made of wood or plastic and are available in various lengths. While the first golf tee was patented in 1889, it was not formally defined in the Rules of Golf until 2004. Under the R&A and USGA Rules of Golf, a tee must be no longer than 4 inches (101.6 mm) and must not be designed to indicate the line of play or influence the movement of the golf ball.

Prior to today's wood or plastic tees, golfers used sand to raise the ball. Caddies often scooped sand from the bottom of the hole to form a tee, which caused the hole to deteriorate. This prompted some courses to provide sand in boxes. Today, those boxes hold sand and grass seed to repair divots.

In 2005, Rand Jerris, then director of the USGA Museum and Archives, said that the adoption of manufactured tees in the 1920s happened quickly, adding that within a "couple years the sand tee disappeared."
