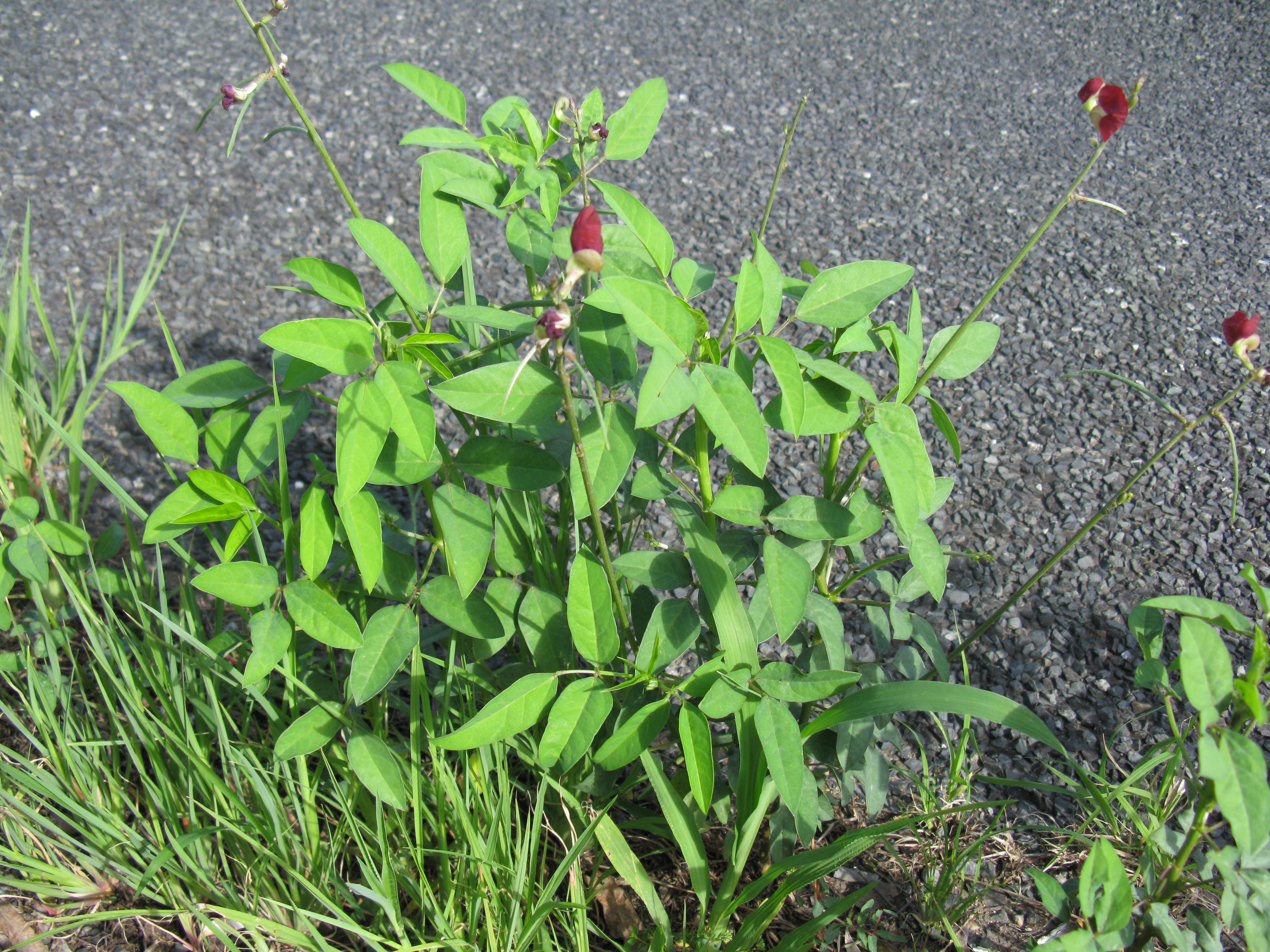

Scientific classification
- Kingdom: Plantae
- Clade: Tracheophytes
- Clade: Angiosperms
- Clade: Eudicots
- Clade: Rosids
- Order: Fabales
- Family: Fabaceae
- Subfamily: Faboideae
- Genus: Macroptilium
- Species: M. lathyroides

Binomial name
- Macroptilium lathyroides (L.) Urb.

Synonyms
- List: Lotus maritimus Vell.; Macroptilium lathyroides var. bustarretianum Stehlé & Quentin; Macroptilium lathyroides var. semierectum (L.) Urb.; Phasellus lathyroides (L.) Moench; Phaseolus candidus f. maritimus (Benth.) Hassl.; Phaseolus cinnabarinus Salisb.; Phaseolus crotalarioides Mart. ex Benth.; Phaseolus hastifolius Mart. ex Benth.; Phaseolus lathyroides L.; Phaseolus lathyroides f. chacoensis Hassl.; Phaseolus lathyroides var. genuinus Hassl.; Phaseolus lathyroides var. hastifolius (Mart. ex Benth.) Hassl.; Phaseolus lathyroides f. hirsutus Hassl.; Phaseolus lathyroides subf. nanus Hassl.; Phaseolus lathyroides f. repandus Hassl.; Phaseolus lathyroides var. semierectus Hassl.; Phaseolus lathyroides f. typicus Hassl.; Phaseolus maritimus Benth.; Phaseolus psoraleoides Wight & Arn.; Phaseolus semierectus L.; Phaseolus semierectus var. angustifolius Micheli; Phaseolus semierectus var. angustifolius Benth.; Phaseolus semierectus var. gracilis M.Gómez; Phaseolus semierectus var. nanus Benth.; Phaseolus semierectus var. subhastatus Benth.; Phaseolus strictus A.Braun & C.D.Bouché

= Macroptilium lathyroides =

Species of legume native to South America

Macroptilium lathyroides is a species of plant in the legume family (Fabaceae) commonly known as the phasey bean. It is the type species of genus Macroptilium. Herbaceous annual or short-lived perennial growing up to 1 m high, it is native to the tropical and subtropical areas of Central and South America, and naturalized throughout the tropics. It is cultivated for forage or as a green manure or cover crop in rotation. As it quickly spreads on disturbed soils, it is considered an environmental weed in some areas.

== Description ==
M. lathyroides is a herbaceous annual or short-lived perennial, 0.6–1 m tall. The leaves are compound with three ovate to lanceolate leaflets, 3–8 cm long and 1–3.5 cm wide. Red to purple flowers, with wing petals larger than the lower petals, develop on long stalks. They grow paired long pods, 5.5–12 cm long, 2.5–3 mm wide, which readily shatter when mature, containing numerous seeds dispersed by winds. Seads are obliquely oblong, about 3 mm long, mottled light and dark grey-brown or black. The plant spreads readily from seed under moist conditions.

== Ecology ==
M. lathyroides is native to much of tropical and subtropical America, from Mexico to Argentina. It is adapted to a wide range of altitudes (up to 2000 m in Ecuador), soil types from deep sands to heavy clays, and with a pH range of (5.0–) 6.0–7.0 (–8.0). It is found in areas with annual rainfall range of 750–2,000 mm. It can tolerate moderate frost and moderate salinity.

Plants tend to form dense monocultures, but once established, they combine well with open grasses, particularly under fertile conditions. Especially in shade, they readily twin with each other or other plants, reaching up to 1.5 m.

M. lathyroides is widely naturalized across the tropical areas of the world, cultivated for forage or as a green manure or cover crop in rotation. It is regarded as a good pioneer species since it spreads easily without competition and exhibits good early growth. In some areas it is considered a minor weed of rice. In Queensland and the Northern Territory in Australia it is regarded as an environmental weed.

== Gallery ==
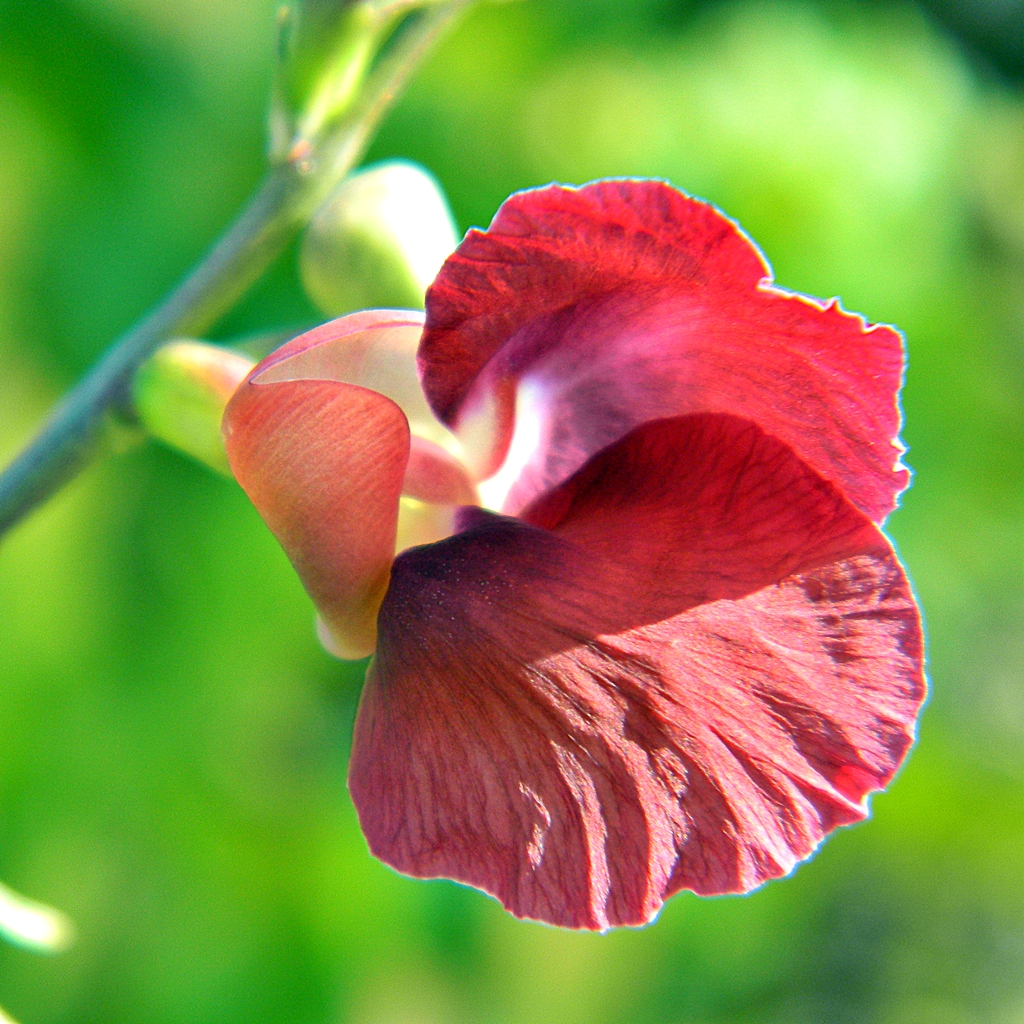
Flower

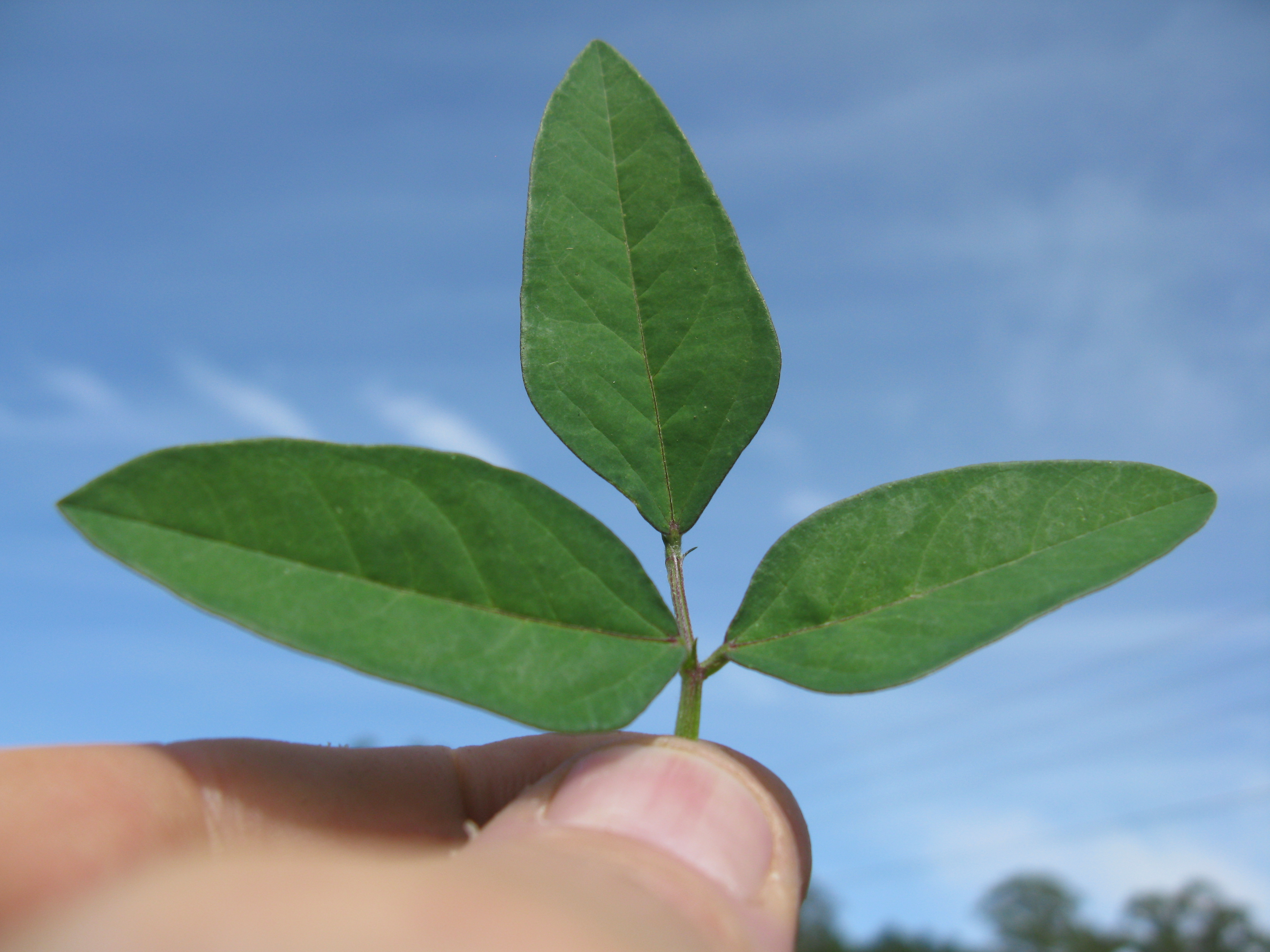
Leaf

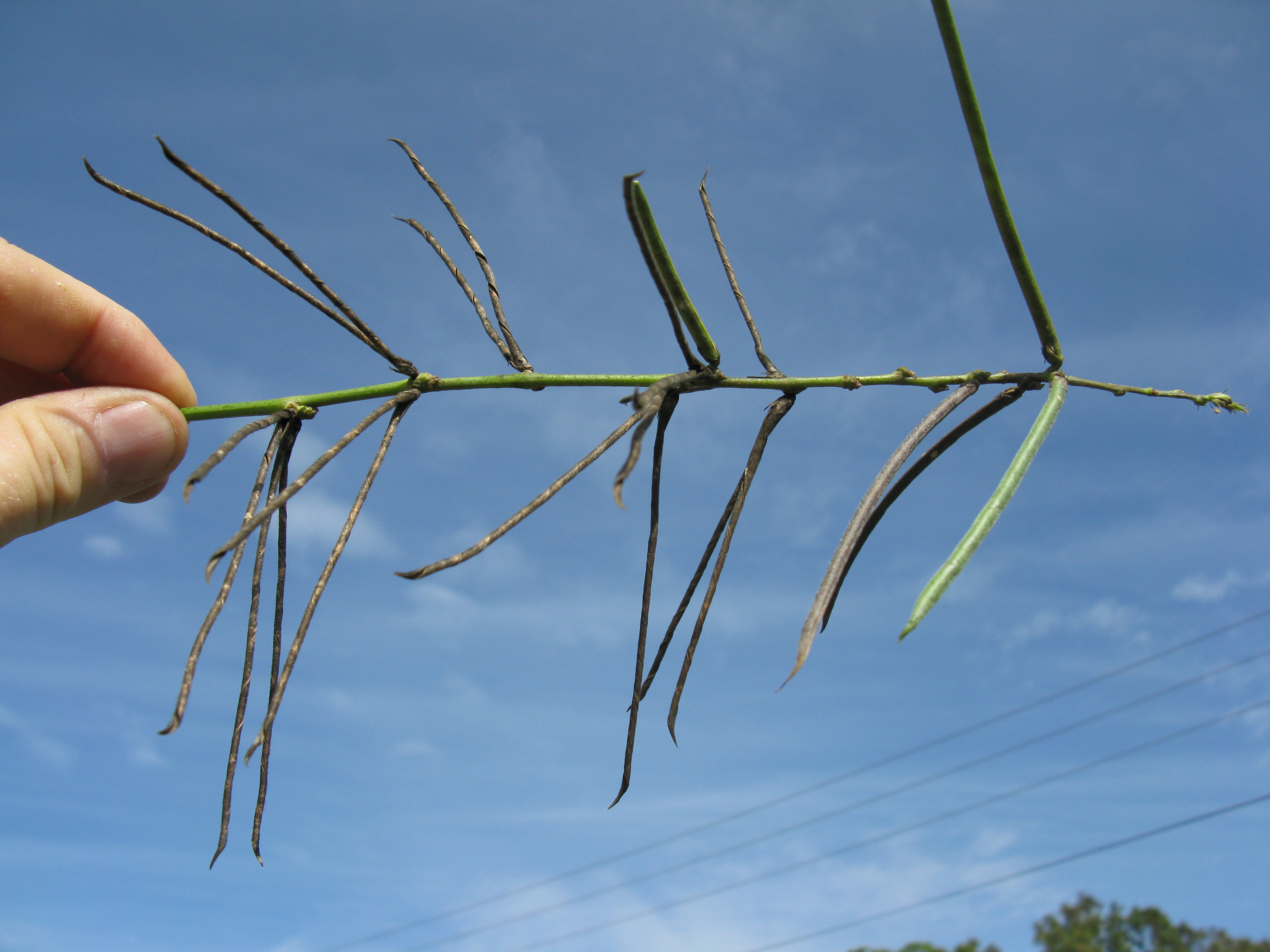
Pods

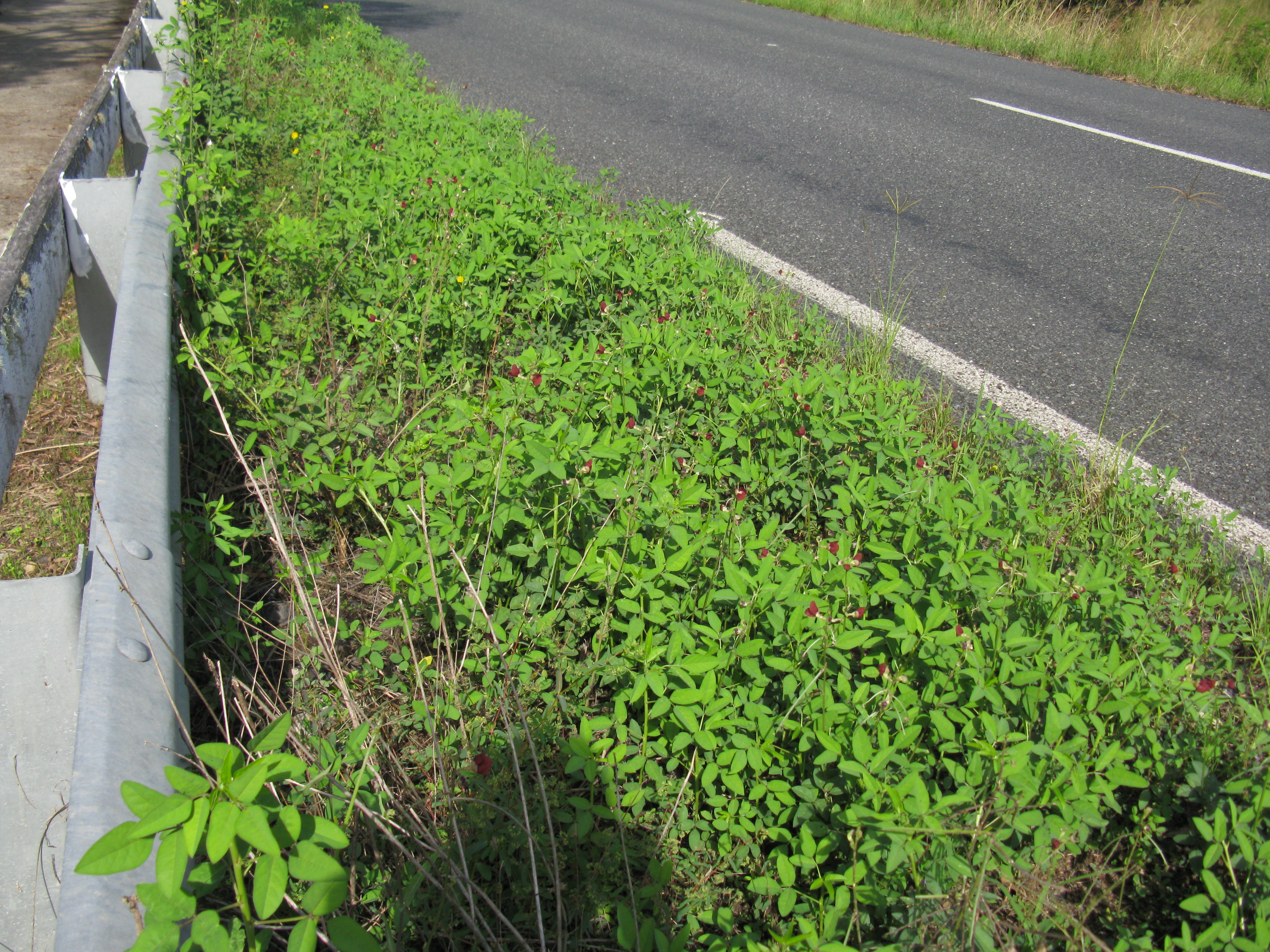
Roadside colony

== See also ==
- Macroptilium atropurpureum, a related species with similar characteristics
