= IAMWARM =

IAMWARM (Irrigated Agriculture Modernisation and Water-bodies Restoration and Management) is a 6-year water management project in the arid Indian state of Tamil Nadu that aims to facilitate efficient irrigation practices by local farmers.

In Tamil Nadu, this IAMWARM project successfully implemented as TN-IAMWARM
