= Subsurface textile irrigation =

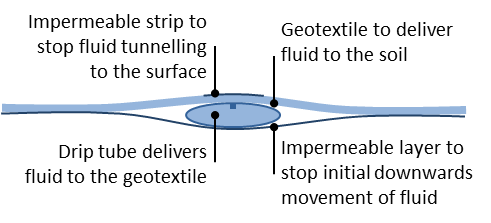
Diagram showing the structure of an example SSTI installation.

Subsurface Textile Irrigation (SSTI) is a technology designed specifically for subsurface irrigation in all soil textures from desert sands to heavy clays. The use of SSTI will significantly reduce the usage of water, fertilizer and herbicide. It will lower on-going operational costs and, if maintained properly, will last for decades. By delivering water and nutrients directly to the root zone, plants are healthier and have a far greater yield.

It is the only irrigation system that can safely use recycled water or treated water without expensive “polishing” treatment because water never reaches the surface.

A typical subsurface textile irrigation system has an impermeable base layer (usually polyethylene or polypropylene), a drip line running along that base, a layer of geotextile on top of the drip line and, finally, a narrow impermeable layer on top of the geotextile (see diagram). Unlike standard drip irrigation, the spacing of emitters in the drip pipe is not critical as the geotextile moves the water along the fabric up to 2m from the dripper.

SSTI is installed 15–20 cm below the surface for residential/commercial applications and 30–50 cm for agricultural applications.

== How SSTI works ==
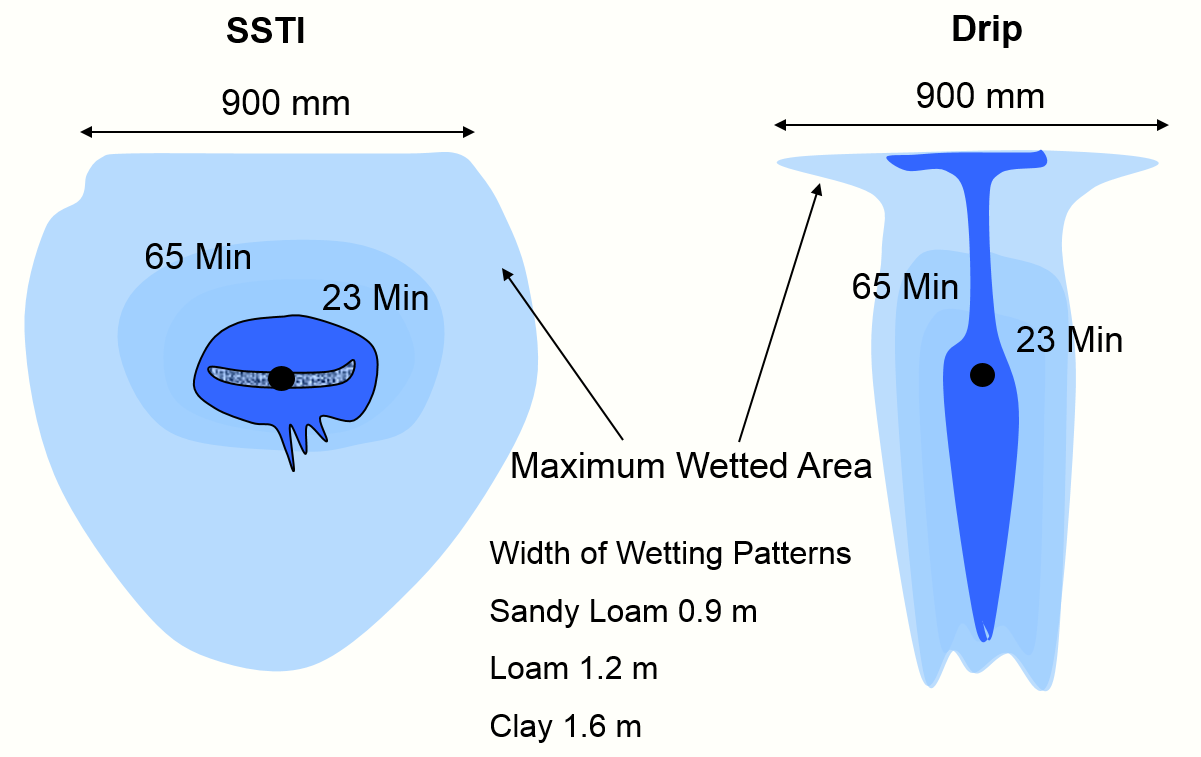
A cross-sectional view of the wetting pattern provided by SSTI, as compared to drip irrigation.

The systems rely on specific geotextiles to absorb the water from the drippers and to rapidly transport that water via mass flow and capillary action along the geotextile effectively turning those single drippers into billions of emitters. In essence, this enables intimate control of the speed of water delivery so that the capillary action of any soil can be matched (something that is virtually impossible for any other irrigation method including bare drip pipe below the surface). If the capillary action of the soil can be matched with the water delivery, only the minimal amount of water is needed to service the needs of the plants above (note that capillary forces draw water up from the water source to the roots of the plants).

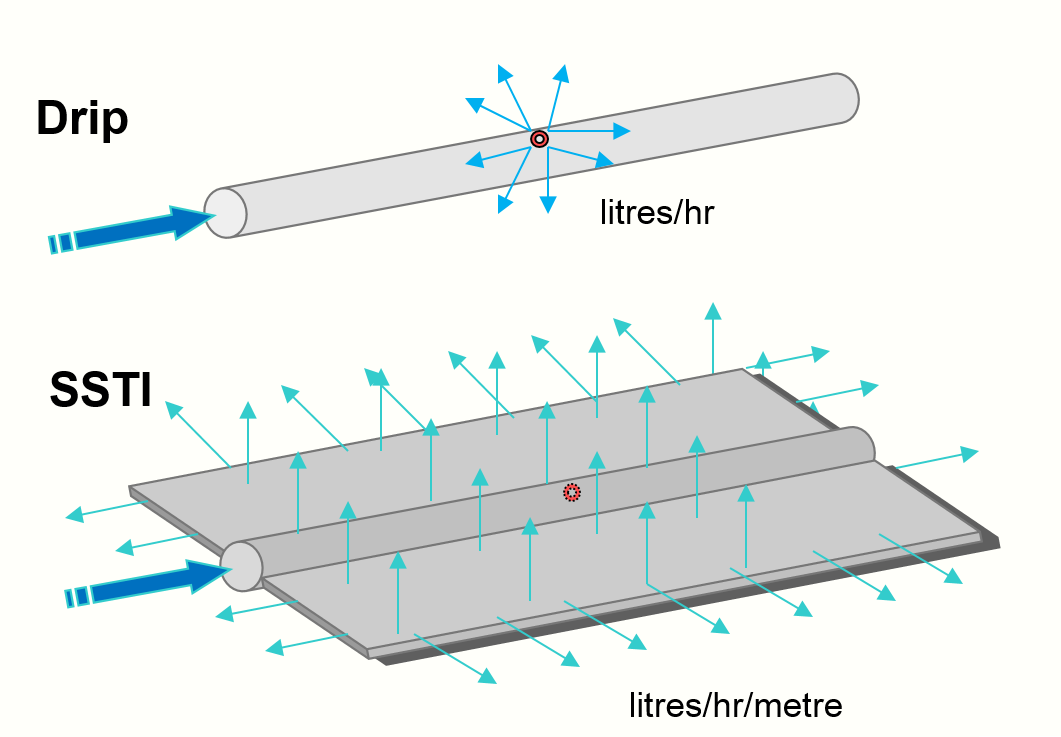
Shows the flow of water through an SSTI installation as compared to a drip irrigation system.

To increase effectiveness, SSTI products should have an impermeable base layer to slow gravitational loss of water and to create an elliptical wetting pattern under the soil surface (see diagram). It should also have a small impermeable top layer to ensure that water from the dripper does not “tunnel” through the geotextile and up to the surface (again a common problem with bare subsurface drip pipe). The effect of these two layers is dramatic as it maximizes the spread of water through the geotextile (up to 10,000 times faster than a clay loam soil as tested by Charles Sturt University).

When comparing SSTI with surface drip, using the same amount of water, SSTI can cover 2.5 times the volume of soil and takes six times longer to dry down until the next irrigation is required

== Recycled water and treated effluent ==
Recycled water can be used in SSTI systems as it will spread the nutrient load over 2-3 times the soil volume (compared to other irrigation methods). This means that additional nutrient requirements are minimized and the soil will have a long life without overloading other nutrients (especially phosphorus and potassium).

A major benefit of SSTI is that treated effluent can be used but is prevented from reaching the surface. Recreational or agricultural activities can continue on the field during irrigation without the contaminants coming in contact with the public.

Nutrients can be injected through all SSTI systems (fertigation). Macro and micro nutrients can be delivered to specific crops including grass, pasture, trees and vines. The nutrient is placed directly in the root zone so there is almost no wastage and no potential for run off into waterways.

== History ==
=== Use of geotextiles ===
Geotextiles were used for capillary irrigation not long after World War II. However, it was not until 1995 that extensive research was conducted at the CSIRO Division of Land and Water in Griffith, Australia, by Grain Security Foundation Ltd, that SSTI was established as a serious commercial alternative to drip.

Polyester geotextile of specific thickness and manufacture is required to ensure the system has the appropriate flow characteristics and so that it does not become hydrophobic (repels water).

=== Solving typical subsurface problems ===
==== Summary ====
Studies were done on many forms of geotextile using various dripper rates and configurations to evaluate water flow for the major soil texture types and to determine if SSTI had the same problems experienced by subsurface drip systems (SDI). Specifically, considerable focus was placed on the problem of root intrusion, tunnelling, dripper blockage and insect damage (serious problems associated with SDI).

==== Root intrusion ====
Research data showed that roots could invade the geotextile but did not thrive nor thicken in the polyester geotextile and, therefore, caused no damage. The roots were deterred from entering the dripper area because that area is dry relative to the rest of the system. Roots simply went elsewhere.

==== Tunneling ====
Tunneling (the process whereby water works its way up to the surface) was nearly eliminated by the narrow reflective impermeable tape above the drip line.

==== Blocked drip emitters ====
Drippers are often blocked in bare drip systems due to soil lodging in the emitters and/or soil crusting around the emitters when the system is not operating. SSTI eliminates this problem because there is a physical barrier presented by the geotextile and due to the fact that the soil remains moist for much longer than drip systems (i.e. the soil does not form a crust anyway).

==== Insects ====
Similarly, insects are deterred from damaging SSTI systems because of the geotextile barrier.

=== Water delivery ===
Initially solid, thick-walled drip pipes were used in trials at the CSIRO but subsequent trials between 1995 and 1998 demonstrated that drip tapes (thin-walled, flexible pipe) could be used very effectively. The loss of strength from using thin-walled drip tapes was countered by the additional tensile strength of the entire system (base layer, drip tape and geotextile). While significantly reducing the cost of SSTI, the use of drip tapes also permitted the use of large diameter drip lines (of up to 35mm) allowing for run lengths up to one (1) kilometre. The thin, flexible wall of drip tape also meant that master rolls of manufactured product could be much larger (over 600m in length).

=== Optimal width and wetting patterns ===
The width of SSTI products varies based on the application. However, at the University of Queensland, Australia trials were conducted to discover the optimal width of the SSTI in black cracking clay with alfalfa sown across a single SSTI line. The SSTI line was 20 cm wide and was installed 30 cm below the surface. The alfalfa germinated directly above the SSTI line but covered 75 cm either side (a total of 1.5 m) in uniform lines. As a result of this research, most SSTI systems are between 6 cm and 20 cm wide. However, some products are up to 2 m wide.

=== Installation technologies ===
In 1997 the first SSTI plow was tested at CSIRO Griffith using a standard three point linkage behind a tractor. This demonstrated that SSTI could be installed at 20–40 cm deep quickly and easily using the plow. SSTI plows are now available to install 1, 2 or 3 lines (more lines are possible).

=== Other uses of SSTI ===
In 1996 the first ebb and flow mat technology for potted plants was commercialized based on SSTI technology using drip tapes to control the water delivery. This ebb and flow mat form of SSTI proved very effective in producing potted plants, sprouted wheat and barley for animal production and for research purposes in producing seed varieties without the use of any overhead irrigation. It also provided an effective fertilizer delivery platform.

== Components ==
Well-designed SSTI systems are laid out essentially the same as drip systems but in many cases SSTI can be laid in a “serpentine” pattern vastly reducing the number of take-off connections and potential leaks.

Most drip tubes/tapes used in SSTI are pressure compensating. For example, using a 16mm drip tape, a run of up to 180 m can be achieved from one connection. Longer runs of up to 1,000 m can be achieved using lower flow rates per lineal metre and/or larger diameter drip tape.

The following components make up a typical SSTI installation:

- Pump or pressurized water source to 100–300 kPa (15–44 psi)
- Water filters or filtration system from 120 micron with suspended solids less than 30ppm
- Fertigation injector systems
- Back flow prevention
- Pressure regulating valves
- Main line. Can be LDPE or PVC
- Solenoid valves or gate valves to control water flow
- SSTI system laterals
- Barbed or Spinlock fittings with stainless steel clips
- Flushing valves at the end of laterals or combined laterals into a flushing line so that regular flushing can remove suspended solids or bacteria that may build up when using recycled water

Using drip tapes in SSTI means that there is a wide range of commercial fittings making SSTI very easy to install. Fittings are usually spinlock or ringlock devices securing the drip tape using a barb.

== Performance of SSTI ==
=== Advantages of SSTI ===
The advantages of SSTI are:

- SSTI is a “permanent” solution if maintained properly. The components are inert and, given that they are situated below the ground, are not subject to the effects of weather, animals, machinery, vandals or other terrestrial conditions.
- Water savings of 50-75% compared with overhead systems
- Low pressure requirement (also means lower power requirements)
- Yields can be improved up to four (4) times in certain crops
- Minimal root intrusion to drippers in the SSTI with a deflective tape on top
- No emitter blockage due to crusting
- Minimal effect of evaporation
- Safe use of recycled or treated water
- Can use the field (for recreation or agriculture) while irrigation is running
- Weed growth is minimized because the water does not reach the surface (saving herbicide cost). Germination of weeds only occurs during rainfall.
- Fertigation can be done directly to the root zone (saving fertilizer cost)
- Efficient distribution of nutrients to the entire root zone
- Broad wetting patterns (moisture covers the entire root zone)
- Water delivery can match the natural capillary rates in soil so saturation is minimized
- Soil moisture can maintained at field capacity (minimised gravitational losses)
- No surface run off
- Soil erosion is minimized
- Fields do not have to be perfectly level
- Fields with irregular shapes can be accommodated
- Distance between lines of SSTI is far greater than drip (lower number of solenoids and other components compared to sprinklers and drip).
- SSTI laterals can be ploughed in behind a tractor on large sites (over 10,000 m per day)
- Foliage remains dry (fungal and bacterial leaf disease is minimized)

=== Disadvantages of SSTI ===
The disadvantages of SSTI are:

- Initial capital cost is typically more than overhead irrigation
- Quality installation is critical. If mistakes made, they are difficult to find.
- Installation using correct fittings must be done
- Regular maintenance is required to ensure long life
- Automated control and monitoring systems are preferable (subsurface irrigation does not give any visual indicators to show if it is working or not)
- SSTI is usually not UV-treated so it must be kept out of sunlight until it is installed under the surface
- Temporary overhead watering may be required to establish turf in hot areas
- Germination of some agricultural crops may require overhead watering if insufficient rainfall
- SSTI cannot apply fertilizers or herbicides overhead on the surface
- Rodents may damage the system (although less than drip systems)
