= Fertilizer injecter =

Farming equipment

A fertilizer injector is a piece of farming equipment used by farmers to reduce labor when fertilizing a large number of crops. Though this device can be used in a variety of agricultural ways, these injectors are essential in greenhouses and nurseries. This injector is utilized every time the plants are watered, which provides consistency for necessary plant growth. This form of micro-irrigation has become more popular over the past few years, which only further contributes to how unparalleled uniformity this device provides.

Farmers accomplish fertilizing large sections of crops by combining water-soluble fertilizer and water in a tank, where it is then expelled by the injectors onto waiting crops. This process is known as fertigation. By injecting a specified amount of concentrated fertilizer into the device, the injector mixes this into what is called a stock solution. To avoid overfertilization of plants that would result in the plant's death, the precise ratio of fertilizer to water must stay consistent. The concentrated fertilizer solution is stored and mixed in a stock tank and then uniformly distributed throughout the irrigation system as a dilute solution. This distribution system provides more convenience over using dry fertilizers and ensures adequate supply of nitrogen to the plant growth.

== Injector Ratios ==
Fertilizer injector ratios are dependent on how much stock solution will be released with a set amount of water passing through the injector. Nonadjustable (fixed) fertilizer injector ratios traditionally are designed to release a specified amount depending on the model. Adjustable fertilizer injector ratios are preferred by a majority of growers to ensure that crops with varying nutrient requirements are accounted for. The recommended standard of measurement for these ratio rates is parts per million (PPM).

Types of injectors

- Venturi-type - Venturi-type injectors operate by mixing water flowing through a hose with a solution that is drawn into a connecting valve by utilizing the pressure difference between the solution tank and the water hose. These Injectors are not capable of a precise mixture ratio control. Venturi-type injectors are best utilized for small scale growing operations such as personal gardens.
- Positive Displacement Injector - Positive Displacement injectors operate by filling a tank, with a fixed volume, with a concentrated solution that is injected into the water line which has a constant flow rate. This system allows for precise mixture ratio control which is controlled by the size of the tanks, and the pistons which displace the fluid from the tanks.
- Dosatron Injectors - Dosatron injectors are placed on the water line and are powered by the water pressure. The solution is stored in a tank and injected into the water once the injector is activated by the water flow. The mixture ratio is controlled and directly proportional to the volume of water flowing into the injector.
- Anderson Injector - Anderson Injectors are positive displacement injectors that operate on either a flow metered electric pump or water pressure depending on the model. All Anderson injector models have adjustable mixture ratios from 1:50 to 1:1000. Some models can have up to six injector heads.
- Smith Injector - Smith Measuremix injectors are powered by a water motor which is turned when water flows through it and in turn powers the injector pump. The water motor and the injector pump operate on a 1:1 scale with one pump per revolution of the motor, which means the injection rate is controlled by the flow rate of the water.. Most Smith models have a mixture ratio that is permanently set at either 1:100 or 1:200 but other models designed for higher water flow rates have ratios set from 1:800 to 1:4000. Some smith models have the ability to inject two separate solutions at the same time.
- Gewa Injector - Gewa injectors, produced in Germany, unlike other injectors, does not have any suction or pump but operates exclusively on water pressure. The solution is placed inside the injector into a plastic membrane that is suspended in the tank, water is then pumped into the tank and surrounds the plastic membrane and the pressure from the water forces a set amount of the solution out of the plastic membrane and into the water line. The mixture ratio is controlled by setting the plastic membrane to only allow a specified amount of solution out. After several uses the plastic membrane must be replaced.

== Electrical conductivity meters (EC) and pH meters ==
Electrical conductivity meters (EC) and pH meters are used in conjunction to fertilizer injectors to ensure proper nitrogen and manage the pH balance in the soil. Using an EC, nitrogen level tests affirm that samples taken are showing that the mixing procedure for the injector is correct. By taking a control group and subtracting the electrical conductivity value of the untreated water, it's effectively showing the percentage of nitrogen that is required in the soil. pH levels in the soil can be controlled by adding an acid or base into the mixing tank to reach the desired pH level.
