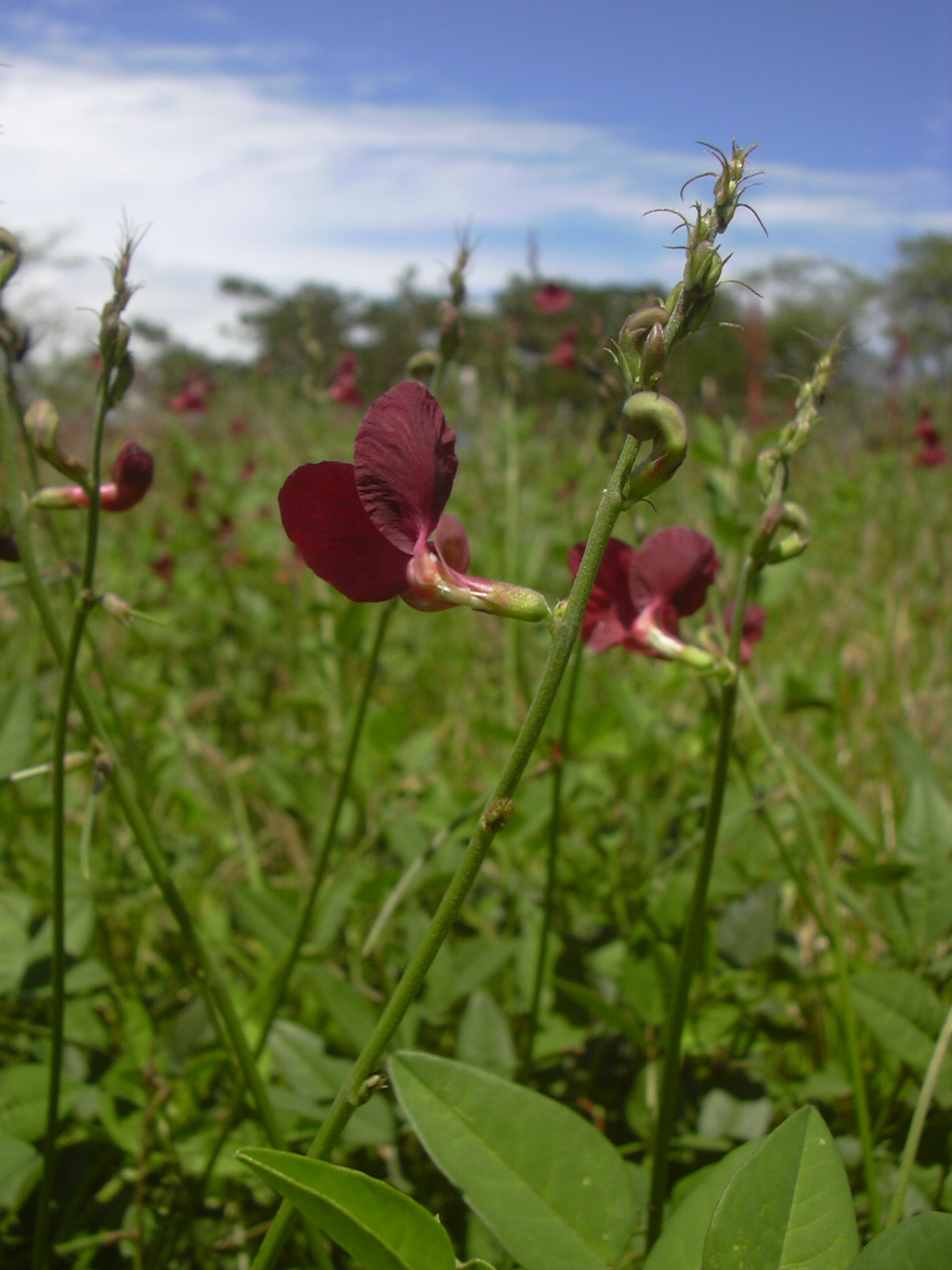
- Macroptilium lathyroides

Scientific classification
- Kingdom: Plantae
- Clade: Tracheophytes
- Clade: Angiosperms
- Clade: Eudicots
- Clade: Rosids
- Order: Fabales
- Family: Fabaceae
- Subfamily: Faboideae
- Clade: Millettioids
- Tribe: Phaseoleae
- Subtribe: Phaseolinae
- Genus: Macroptilium (Benth.) Urb.

Type species
- Macroptilium lathyroides (L.) Urb.

Species
- See text.

= Macroptilium =

Genus of legumes

Macroptilium is a genus of flowering plants in the legume family, Fabaceae. It belongs to the subfamily Faboideae.

== Species ==
Macroptilium is made up of 19 species segregated into two monophyletic sections.

=== Section Macroptilium ===
- Macroptilium atropurpureum
- Macroptilium bracteatum
- Macroptilium erythroloma
- Macroptilium ecuadoriensis
- Macroptilium gracile
- Macroptilium lathyroides
- Macroptilium longepedunculatum
- Macroptilium monophyllum
- Macroptilium panduratum

=== Section Microcochle ===
- Macroptilium arenarium
- Macroptilium cochleatum
- Macroptilium fraternum
- Macroptilium gibbosifolium (Ortega) A. Delgado
- Macroptilium martii
- Macroptilium pedatum
- Macroptilium prostratum
- Macroptilium psammodes
- Macroptilium sabaraense
- Macroptilium supinum
