= TN-IAMWARM =

Tamil Nadu Irrigated Agriculture Modernization and Water-Bodies Restoration and Management (TN-IAMWARM) is a multidisciplinary project funded by the World Bank and implemented by the Water Resources Organization (WRO), PWD and Government of the Indian state of Tamil Nadu as the Nodal Agencies. Tamil Nadu Agriculture University (TNAU) concentrates on the upscaling of water saving technologies in rice and major garden land crops. The total out lay for TNAU is Rs.88.90 crores.

== Overview ==
The focal technologies are systems of rice intensification (Rajarajan 1000), improved production technologies (IPT) on garden pulses, cotton, maize, sunflower, groundnut and gingelly. Promotion of new crops such as thornless bamboo and cocoa intercropping in coconut is also programmed. Precision farming with drip fertigation is also demonstrated with sugarcane, banana, vegetables, tapioca, coconut and flowers. The concept of an organic farming seed village is promoted in the sub basins.

E-velanmai technology will be tested on a pilot basis. Labour saving implements such as a tractor drawn seed drill, maize husker cum sheller and sunflower thresher will be introduced. A mini dhal mill is introduced. Implements such as a coconut shredder will be introduced under waste recycling. Vermi bag – a cost-effective portable unit will be demonstrated.

== Statistics ==
The project covers 6.17 Lakh Hectares of Ayacut areas in four phases. 55 sub basins were covered in year 2013 with an outlay of Rs.2547 crores.

Phase	Year	Sub Basins
Phase I	2007-08	09
Phase II	2008-09	16
Phase III	2009-10	25
Phase IV	2011-12	04

== Coordinating line departments ==
The Coordinating line departments of TN-IAMWARM are as follows

- Agricultural Engineering Department
- Tamil Nadu Agricultural University (TNAU)
- Department of Agriculture
- Department of Horticulture and Plantation Crops
- Department of Agricultural Marketing and Agri Business
- Department of Animal Husbandry and Dairying
- Fisheries Department
