= Cyproconazole =

Names
- IUPAC name 2-(4-Chlorophenyl)-3-cyclopropyl-1-(1H-1,2,4-triazol-1-yl)-2-butanol

Identifiers
CAS Number	94361-06-5
3D model (JSmol)	Interactive image
ChEBI	CHEBI:83748
ChEMBL	ChEMBL2131954
ChemSpider	77706
ECHA InfoCard	100.130.443
PubChem CID	86132
UNII	622B9C3E6T
CompTox Dashboard (EPA)	DTXSID0032601
- InChI: InChI=1S/C15H18ClN3O/c1-11(12-2-3-12)15(20,8-19-10-17-9-18-19)13-4-6-14(16)7-5-13/h4-7,9-12,20H,2-3,8H2,1H3 Key: UFNOUKDBUJZYDE-UHFFFAOYSA-N; InChI=1/C15H18ClN3O/c1-11(12-2-3-12)15(20,8-19-10-17-9-18-19)13-4-6-14(16)7-5-13/h4-7,9-12,20H,2-3,8H2,1H3 Key: UFNOUKDBUJZYDE-UHFFFAOYAK
- SMILES: CC(C1CC1)C(Cn2cncn2)(c3ccc(cc3)Cl)O

Properties
Chemical formula	C_{15}H_{18}ClN_{3}O
Molar mass	291.78 g·mol^{−1}
Melting point	107.5 °C (225.5 °F; 380.6 K)
- Except where otherwise noted, data are given for materials in their standard state (at 25 °C [77 °F], 100 kPa). Infobox references

Cyproconazole is an agricultural fungicide of the class of azoles, used on cereal crops, coffee, sugar beet, fruit trees and grapes, and peanuts, on sod farms and golf course turf and on wood as a preservative. It has been used against powdery mildew, rust on cereals and apple scab, and applied by air or on the ground or by chemigation.

In the US approval began in 1993, and it was introduced to the market by then Sandoz in 1994, which as of 2000 has been Syngenta. EU approval began in June 2011 and expired after 10 years in May 2021. It is persistent in both soil and water systems. The European Community has classified cyproconazole into carcinogen category 3 as limited evidence, as reproductive toxicant, and as dangerous for the environment, because very toxic to aquatic organisms, causing acute and long-term adverse effects in the aquatic environment. While it is moderately toxic to mammals and most aquatic organisms, earthworms and honeybees, it is highly toxic to birds.

== Mechanism of action ==
Cyproconazole inhibits demethylation, a particular step in the synthesis of a component of the fungal cell wall called sterol. This means it affects fungal growth, but not the fungal sporulation. This explains why it must be used, when fungal growth is at a maximum, early in the infection, because in late infections fungal growth slows down and the agent is ineffective.

== Use ==
=== Formulations ===
Many different formulations exist with imazalil, difenoconazole, prochloraz, propiconazole, chlorothalonil, cyprodinil, fludioxonil, azoxystrobin, and copper. In wood preservatives it is mixed with didecyldimethylammonium chloride. It is the active ingredient in two foliar fungicides for soybeans in the U.S.: Alto X, and mixed with azoxystrobin in Quadris Xtra, both by Syngenta. It is also manufactured by Bayer CropScience and Dow AgroSciences.

=== Application ===
Cyproconazole is used against powdery mildew, rust on cereals and apple scab, and applied by air or on the ground to cereal crops, coffee, sugar beet, fruit trees and grapes. It controls the following pests: Puccinia graminis, Puccinia spp., Pseudocercosporella herpotrichoides, and Septoria species. It can be used on above-ground wood to prevent it from decay from fungi as an alternative to chromated copper arsenate. It was originally marketed for use on sod farms and golf course turf.

In the U.S., chemigation is allowed with less than half inch application, aerial spraying with 5 gallon per acre; ground application is adequate for coverage and canopy penetration. The re-entry interval is 12 hours. Reapplication within 30 days of harvest is not permitted.

== Hazards and ecotoxicity ==
Cyproconazole is moderately soluble in water and has a high risk of leaching to groundwater. It is persistent in both soil and water systems. The European Community has classified cyproconazole into carcinogen category 3 as limited evidence, into the reproduction risk category 3 as "possible risk of harm to the unborn child", as harmful if swallowed, and dangerous for the environment, because it is very toxic to aquatic organisms, causing long-term adverse effects in the aquatic environment. While it is moderately toxic to mammals and most aquatic organisms, earthworms and honeybees, it is highly toxic to birds. In sandy loam soil, half life was 148 days.

In EPA's 2011 predictive model of reproductive toxicity cyproconazole was shown to be a reproductive toxicant using Toxcast high-throughput screening.

Cyproconazole like fluconazole, a triazole used in human medicine, can induce liver swelling in mice. As of 2015 the constitutive androstane receptor has been shown to be mediator for this effect. Cyproconazole is an endocrine disruptor and has been shown to cause a dose dependent inhibition of progesterone production in human placental cells in vitro.

=== Toxicokinetics ===
Cyproconazole as other triazoles inhibits the enzyme cytochrome P-450, so it can no longer demethylate lanosterol, an intermediate needed in ergosterol synthesis. In fish, CYP mediated steroid metabolism and xenobiotic metabolism can be affected in opposite ways. The half-life of cyproconazole in trout was about one day.

== Fungal resistance ==
Development of fungal resistance can be prevented by not using cyproconazole "repeatedly alone in the same season" or by not using it late in the infection, that is, curatively. Fungi can develop resistance if the same fungicide is used repeatedly or when fungicides with the same mode of action are repeatedly.(package insert Alto 100Syngenta)

== Regulation ==
In the U.S. Sandoz applied in 1988 for registration under the Federal Insecticide, Fungicide, and Rodenticide Act (FIFRA) with the U.S. EPA, and cyproconazole was approved on December 22, 1993.

In 2006, EPA settled with Syngenta for $15,600, because they failed to report cyproconazole production in India and Switzerland. In 2007, the U.S. Environmental Protection Agency had issued a Section 18 quarantine exemption for using Syngenta's then unregistered cyproconazole product "Alto 100 SL" against Asian soybean rust in soybeans, and in 2008, it issued a Section 3 registration. In 2009, Syngenta applied for full registration of cyproconazole use on soybean. In 2012, Syngenta requested the EPA to establish regulations for residues of cyproconazole in or on peanut including nutmeat, peanut hay, peanut meal, peanut butter and refined oil, which as of 2015 was still under review.

=== Europe ===
In Europe, Syngenta had applied for registration in 2009 and the European Food Safety Authority recommended cyproconazole be registered in 2010. Approval began in June 2011 and expired after 10 years in May 2021. The acceptable daily intake per the European Chemicals Agency is 0.02 mg/kg body weight per day. Cyproconazole is registered under the REACH Regulation with the ECHA. Since 2013, permitted maximum residue levels vary from 0.05 mg/kg for most vegetables up to 0,1 mg/kg in stone fruit and cereals.
