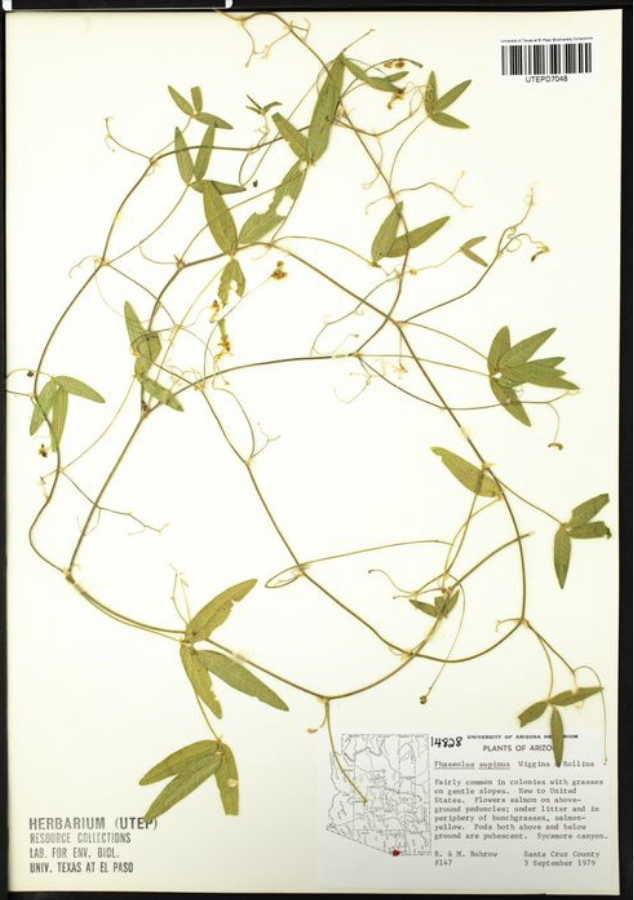

Conservation status
- Imperiled (NatureServe)

Scientific classification
- Kingdom: Plantae
- Clade: Tracheophytes
- Clade: Angiosperms
- Clade: Eudicots
- Clade: Rosids
- Order: Fabales
- Family: Fabaceae
- Subfamily: Faboideae
- Genus: Macroptilium
- Species: M. supinum

Binomial name
- Macroptilium supinum (Wiggins & Rollins) A.Delgado

Synonyms
- Phaseolus supinus

= Macroptilium supinum =

Species of legume

Macroptilium supinum is a species of flowering plant in the legume family known by the common name supine bean. It is native to Mexico, with its distribution extending north into the US state of Arizona.

This perennial herb has stems that creep across the ground, growing from a tuber. The leaves are each made up of three lance-shaped leaflets up to 8 cm long. Two types of flowers are seen. Aboveground flowers are salmon-colored. Other flowers grow underground or under debris, do not open, and self-fertilize. They are yellow and salmon-colored and smaller than the opening flowers. The fruit is a legume pod up to 1.5 cm long. Most seeds are produced in fruits that develop underground.

This plant grows in grassland and oak woodland habitat. It is threatened by herbivory by rodents and cattle. Grazing also causes habitat degradation.
