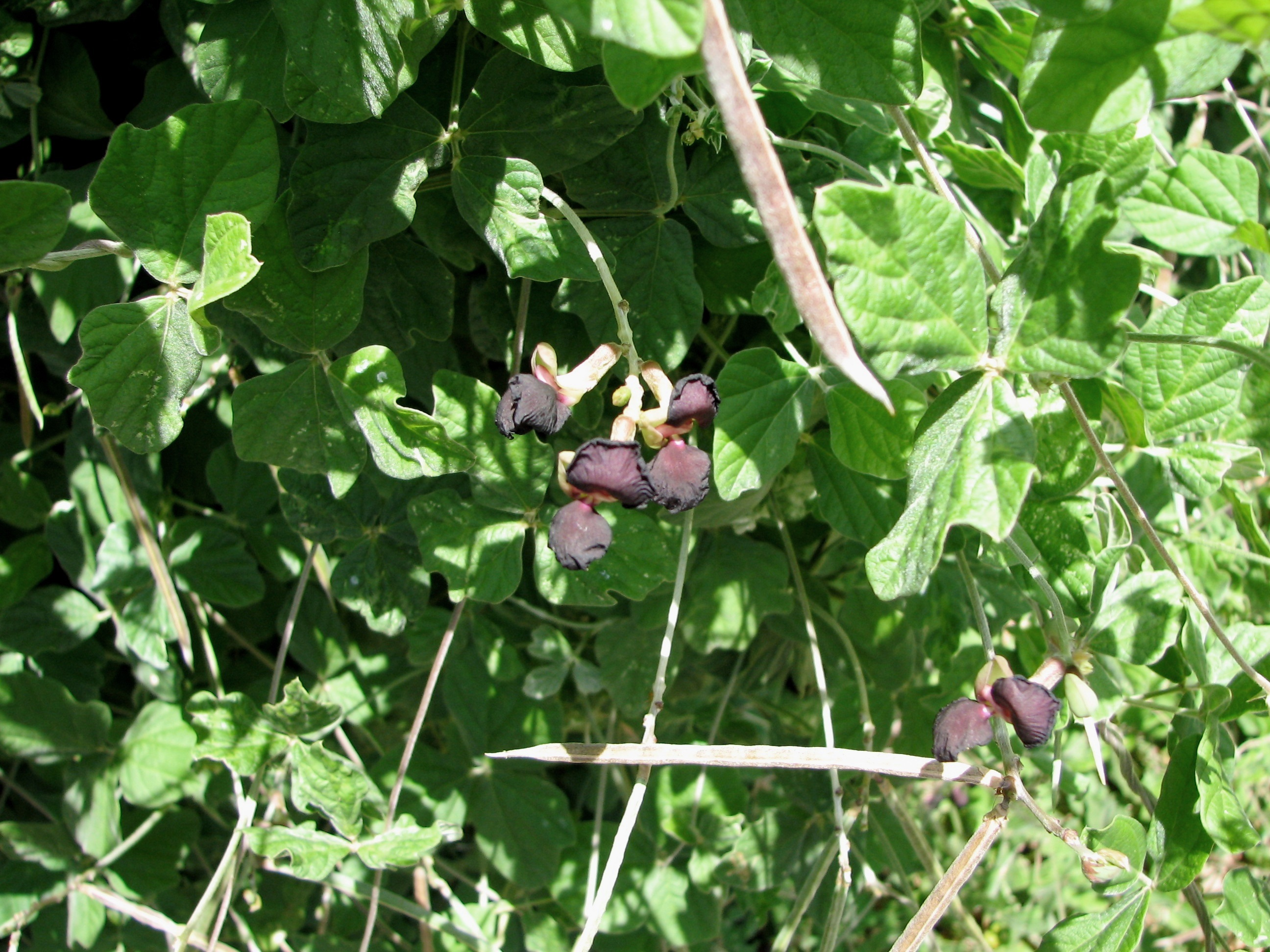
- Leaves, flowers, and pods

Scientific classification
- Kingdom: Plantae
- Clade: Tracheophytes
- Clade: Angiosperms
- Clade: Eudicots
- Clade: Rosids
- Order: Fabales
- Family: Fabaceae
- Subfamily: Faboideae
- Genus: Macroptilium
- Species: M. atropurpureum

Binomial name
- Macroptilium atropurpureum (DC.) Urb.

Synonyms
- List: Dolichos rhynchosioides Desv.; Phaseolus affinis Piper; Phaseolus atropurpureus Torr.; Phaseolus atropurpureus DC.; Phaseolus atropurpureus var. canescens (M.Martens & Galeotti) Hassl.; Phaseolus atropurpureus var. genuinus Hassl.; Phaseolus atropurpureus f. intermedius Hassl.; Phaseolus atropurpureus var. pseuderythroloma Hassl.; Phaseolus atropurpureus var. sericeus A.Gray; Phaseolus atropurpureus var. vestitus (Hook.) Hassl.; Phaseolus canescens M.Martens & Galeotti; Phaseolus dysophyllus Benth.; Phaseolus schiedeanus Schltdl.; Phaseolus semierectus var. atropurpureus (DC.) M.Gómez; Phaseolus vestitus Hook.

= Macroptilium atropurpureum =

Species of legume

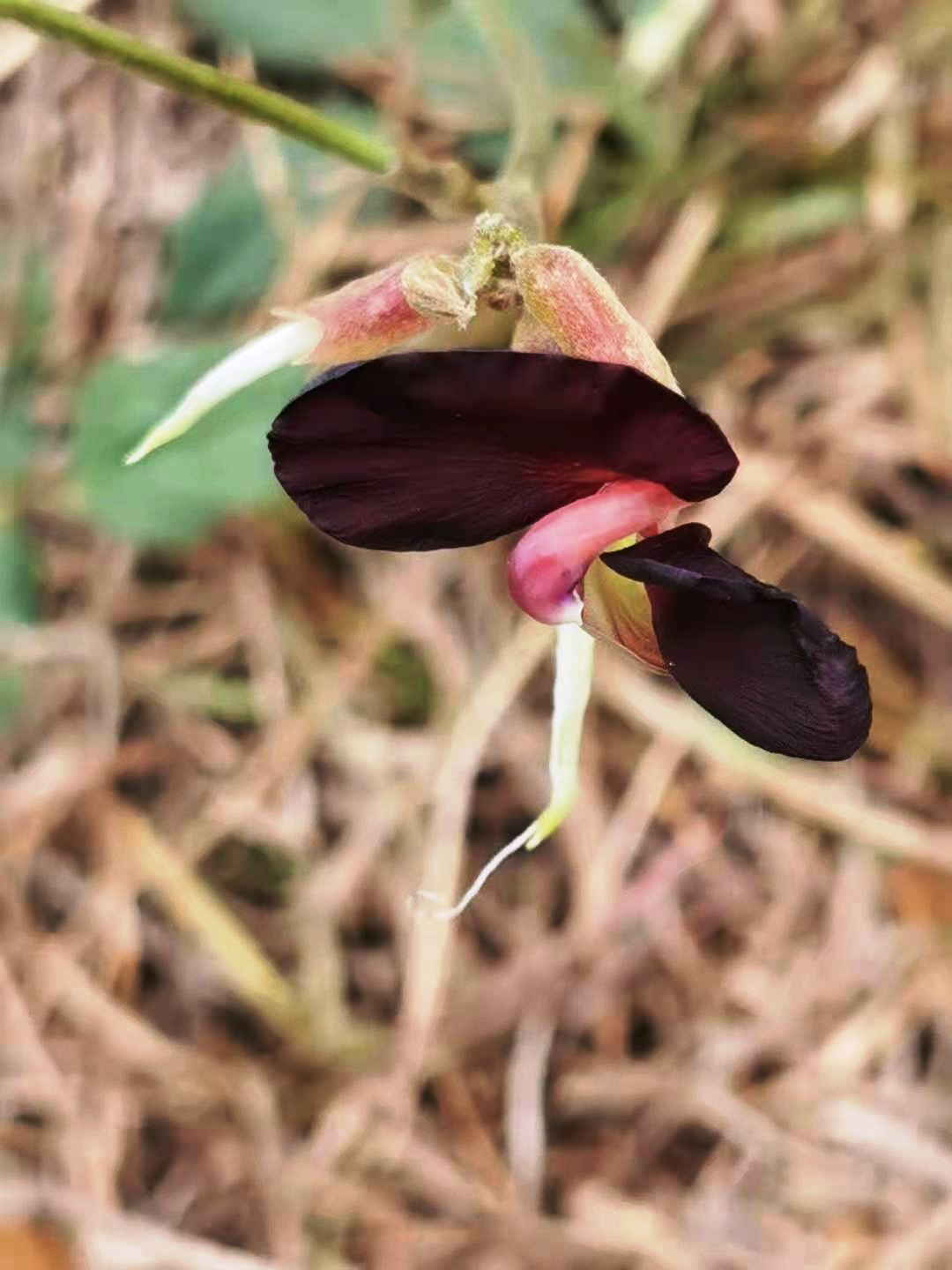
Inflorescence showing one flower with petals and two flowers without petals and young pod

Macroptilium atropurpureum, commonly referred to as purple bush-bean, or siratro is a perennial legume recognized by its climbing, dense, green vines and deep purple flowers. The plant is indigenous to the tropical and subtropical regions of North, Central, and South America, as far north as Texas in the US and as far south as Peru and Brazil. It has been introduced for use as a food for stock to many tropical regions around the world. It has become an invasive pest plant in a number of areas, including the north-eastern coast of Australia. Rich in protein, M. atropurpureum is commonly used for cattle pastures intercropped with grass, used in hay, or as a ground cover to prevent soil erosion and to improve soil quality.

== Description ==
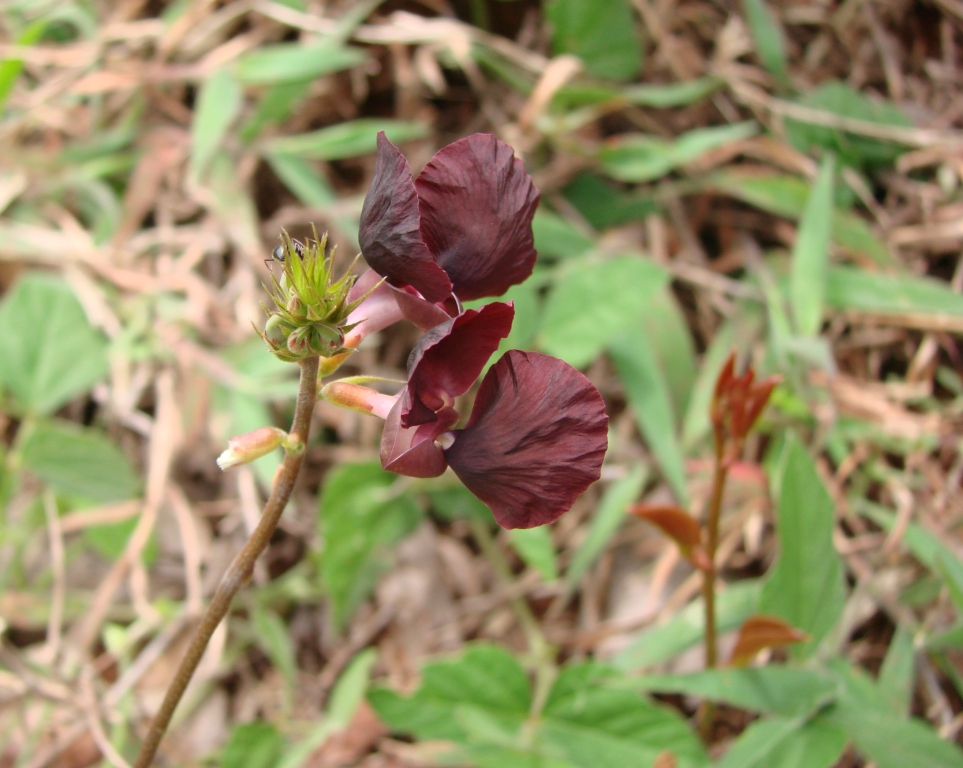
Inflorescence with buds and two open flowers

M. atropurpureum is a tropical herbaceous dicot belonging to the family Fabaceae. It rapidly develops dense, hairy, dark green vines about 5 mm in diameter, until it reaches its mature size around 120 cm. The vines have bright green trifoliolate leaves, which are roughly 2–7 cm long with smooth hairs on the underside. Flowers are dark reddish purple. The seeds are small brown peas with a white spot, found in the plant's pods which hang on the vines in bunches of about 5–10. In weather and soil conditions favourable to the plant, stem nodes close to the soil may root, enabling vegetative propagation of the plant. M. atropurpureum forms a deep swollen taproot up to 2 cm in diameter.

== History and distribution ==
M. atropurpureum is also commonly referred to as 'Siratro' or 'Aztec' (modified races to improve nematode resistance and reduce rust sensitivity, respectively) atro, purple bush-bean (a common English term for the species), Purpurbohne (a common German term for the species), or conchito (a common Spanish name for the species). It has a short lifespan, but a high density, with a minimum of 1200 and a maximum of 1700 plants per acre when it is in season and free to grow. M. atropurpureum is native to Central and South America, as well as the Caribbean Islands, and has been known to grow in some regions of southern North America, including Mexico and the US in states such as Arizona, Texas, Florida, and Hawaii, as well as coastal regions in Queensland and New South Wales, Australia, and scattered regions across Africa. Its historical use has been to serve as pasture for domesticated livestock, and was the first tropical pasture improved by breeding. Performed in Australia in 1960s, native M. atropurpureum was bred to resist nematodes in its roots, which created a modified species known as 'Siratro', which developed a rust sensitivity, so 'Aztec' was developed to counter the arisen problem in 1995. On indigenous North and South American farms where M. atropurpureum was available, it would often be used as a ground cover during dry seasons to take advantage of the nitrogen-fixation abilities the legume has; this prevented soil erosion and acted as an organic fertilizer.

The species is invasive in New Caledonia, where it was first introduced in 1963.

== Growing conditions ==
One of the most strategic advantages to M. atropurpureum is its ability to grow and prosper in varied soil types. It is propagated naturally by legumes bursting and sending seeds forcefully into the ground. Growing season varies geographically, but typically will be in the spring and summer. It can be grown in soils that are coarse and fine, as well as all variations between. Primarily, it is grown on pasture fields interseeded with a grass to retain the soil and prevent erosion. M. atropurpureum is often found by roadsides, in vegetation around waterways and coastal regions, and on disturbed ground. M. atropurpureum can grow in soils with a pH level as low as 5.0 and as high as 8.0. It can also survive in most temperatures, requiring a minimum temperature of 23 °F, and has an average salinity and shade tolerance. It requires an average precipitation between 15 and 111 cm. M. atropurpureum has been tested on several occasions to find additional benefits. When used on a cow pasture intercropped with traditional grass in Australia, it improved milk yield by 2 kg per day. It also improved yields from domestic animals such as goats in Kenya, Zambia, Tanzania, and other African countries. Because of its nitrogen-fixing abilities as a legume, M. atropurpureum acts as an efficient source of protein for animals when intercropped with grass on the pastures of subsistence and low-income farms, especially in Central and South America. In addition to improving yield, it acts as a ground cover for farmers who need a nutrient-rich ground cover to counter soil erosion and improve soil quality.

== Limitations ==
M. atropurpureum is considered a pest plant under some local government law, including some small local governments in Australia. It has negative effects on native shrubs, grasses, and young trees by smothering them under its dense vines and not allowing them enough sunlight or soil nutrients to grow. 'It' also has a few limitations which include its intolerance to poor water drainage, its declining nutritional value after continued grazing, and its susceptibility to leaf disease. In periods of heavy rainfall, M. atropurpureum is susceptible to foliar blight (infection from a pathogenic organism).

== Nutrients ==
M. atropurpureum is primarily grown for its high protein content, with protein accounting for about 16% of the plants' dry matter (25% of a M. atropurpureum vine). Primary amino acids include aspartic acid and proline. It also is a good source of calcium, potassium, and manganese.

== Habit ==
In growth, M. atropurpureum sprawls outward to cover the ground. By doing so, it acts as an efficient weed suppressor, as it competes with weeds for soil nutrients, and smothers them under its vines. Planting it on a weed-infested field will reduce and kill weed populations, and improve the soil at the same time. It fixes nitrogen from 55 to 175 kg N/ha/year. When M. atropurpureum was used as living mulch in banana plantations, fruit yields improved. Primarily, it should be used for a simple ground covering to control erosion and for revegetation of low-fertility land.

== Gallery ==
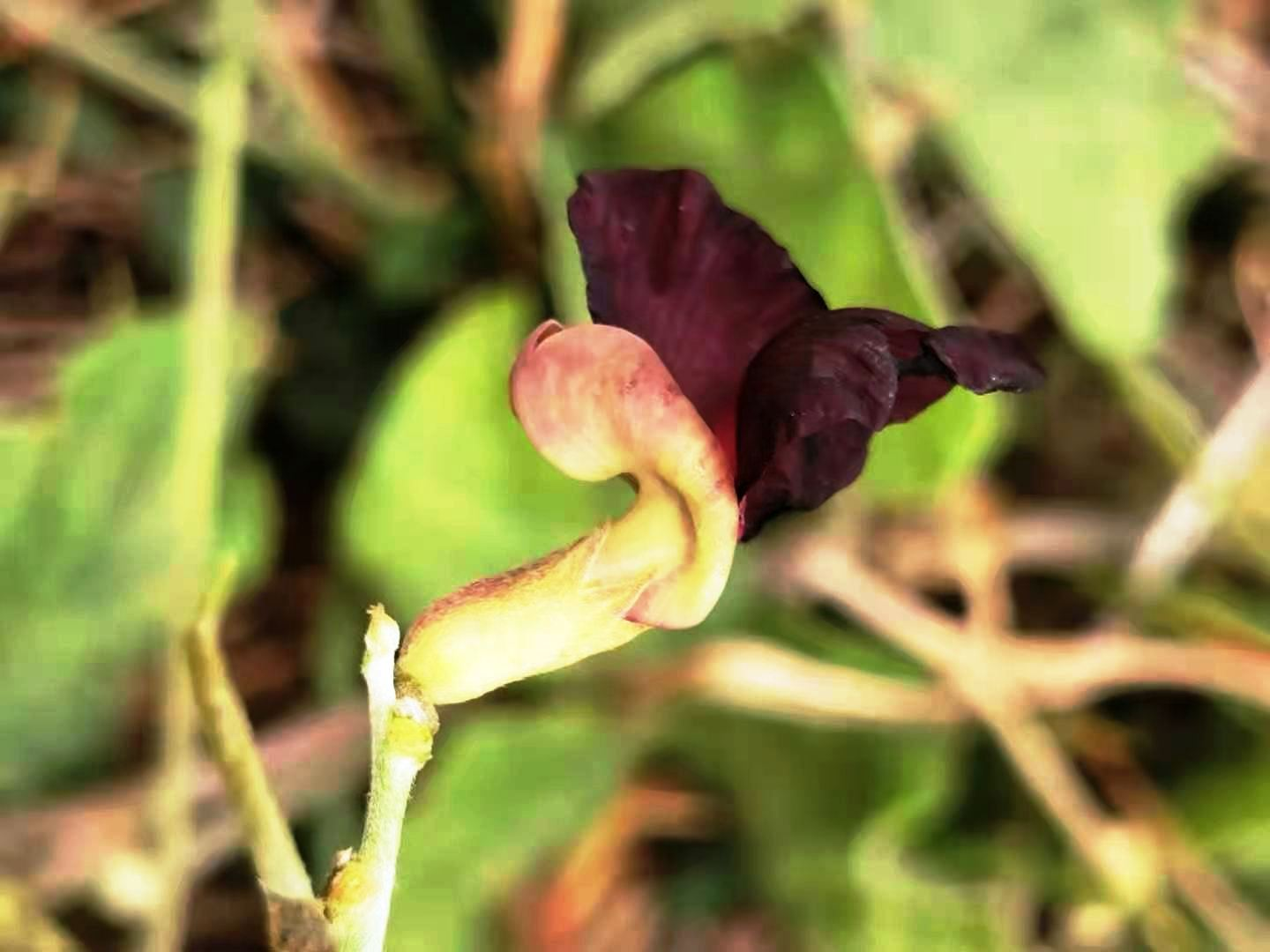

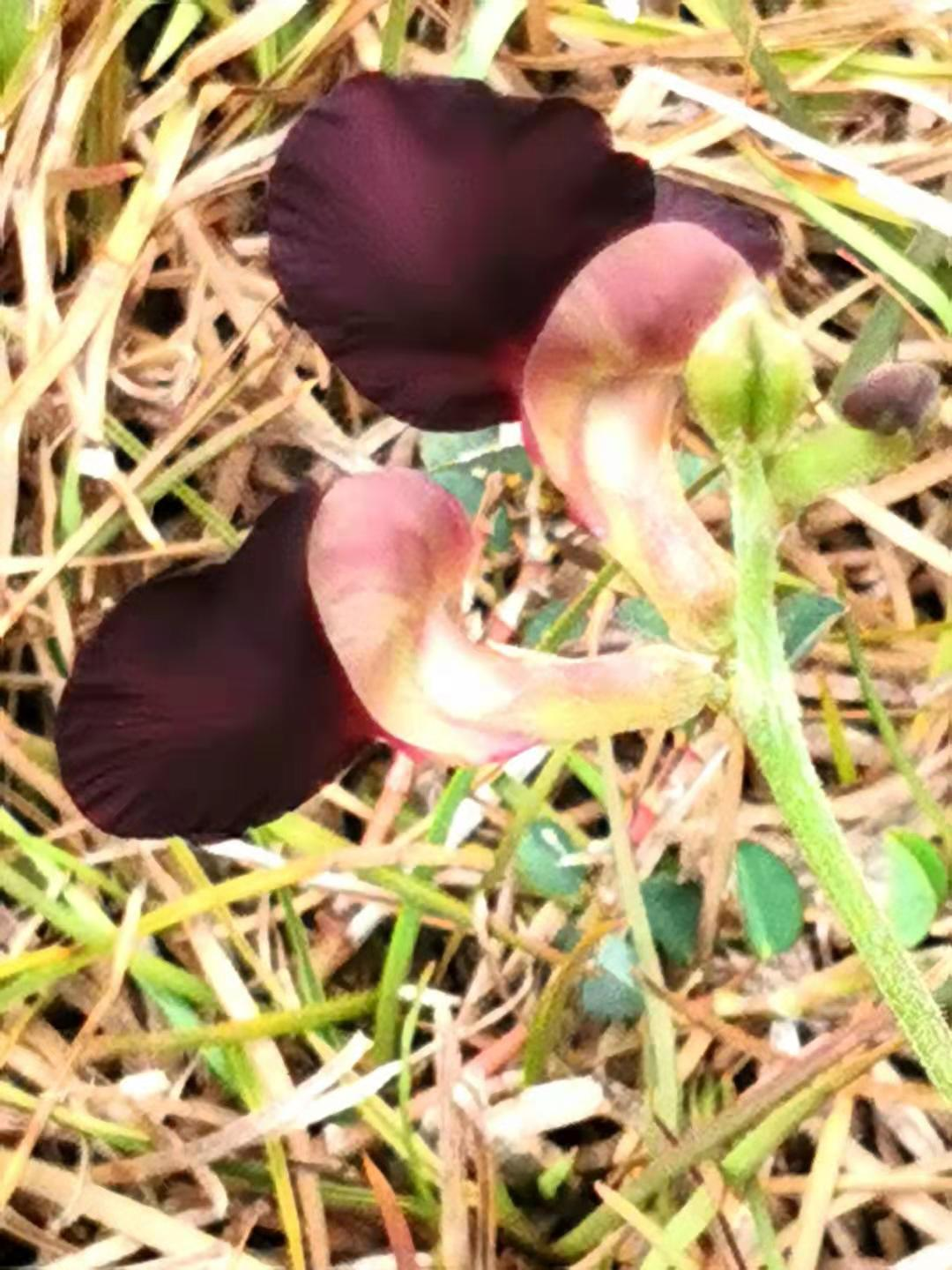

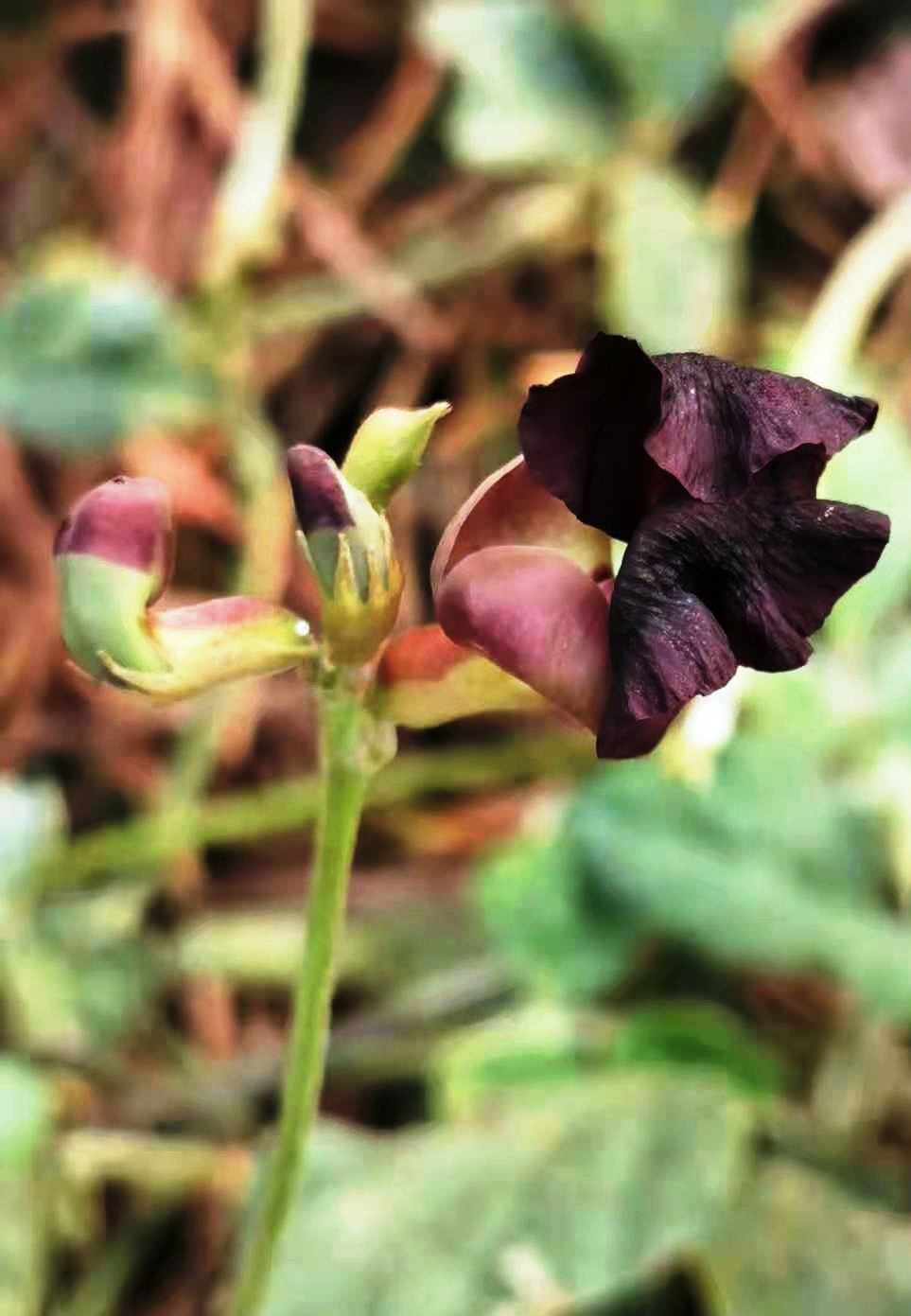

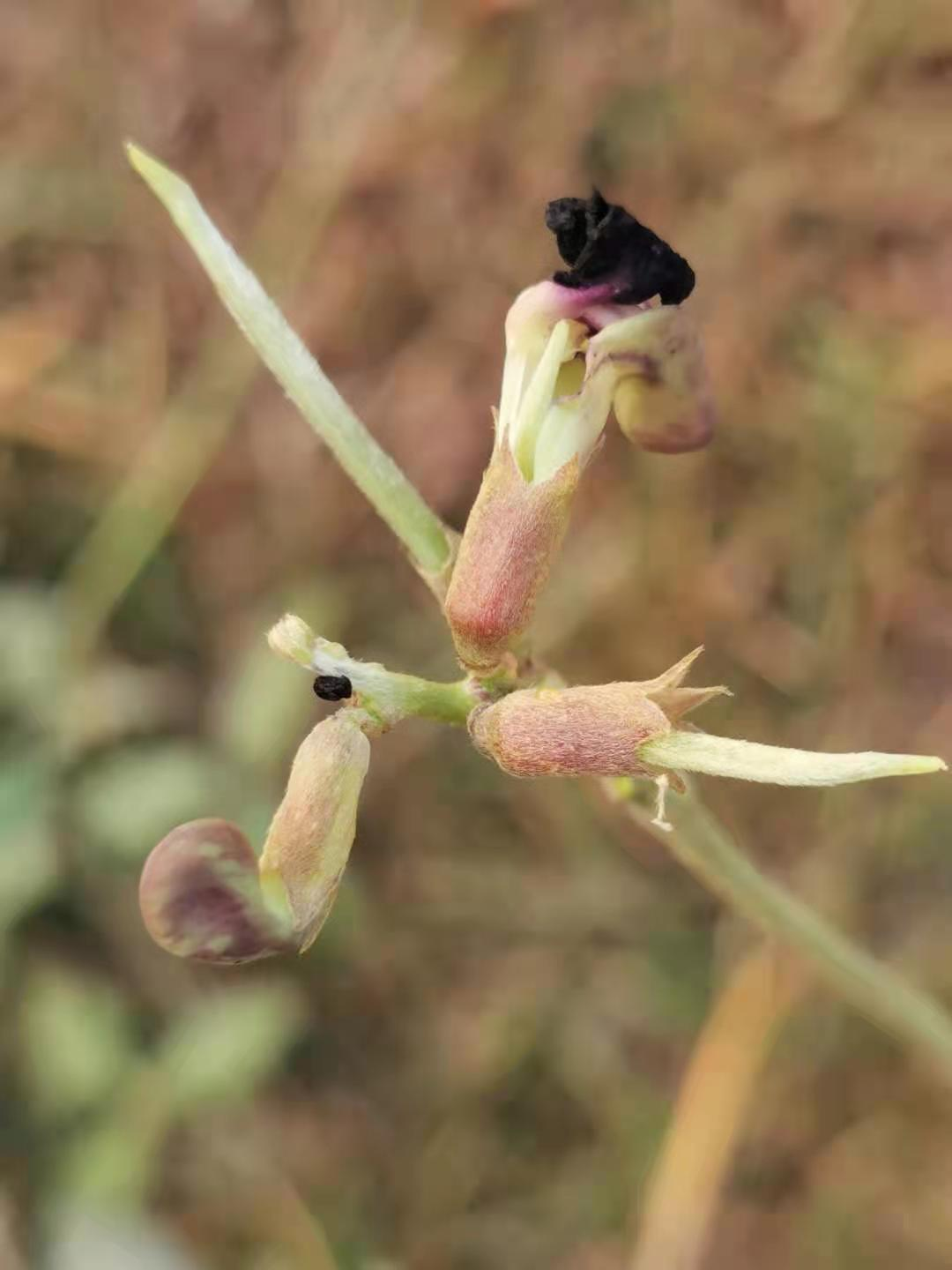

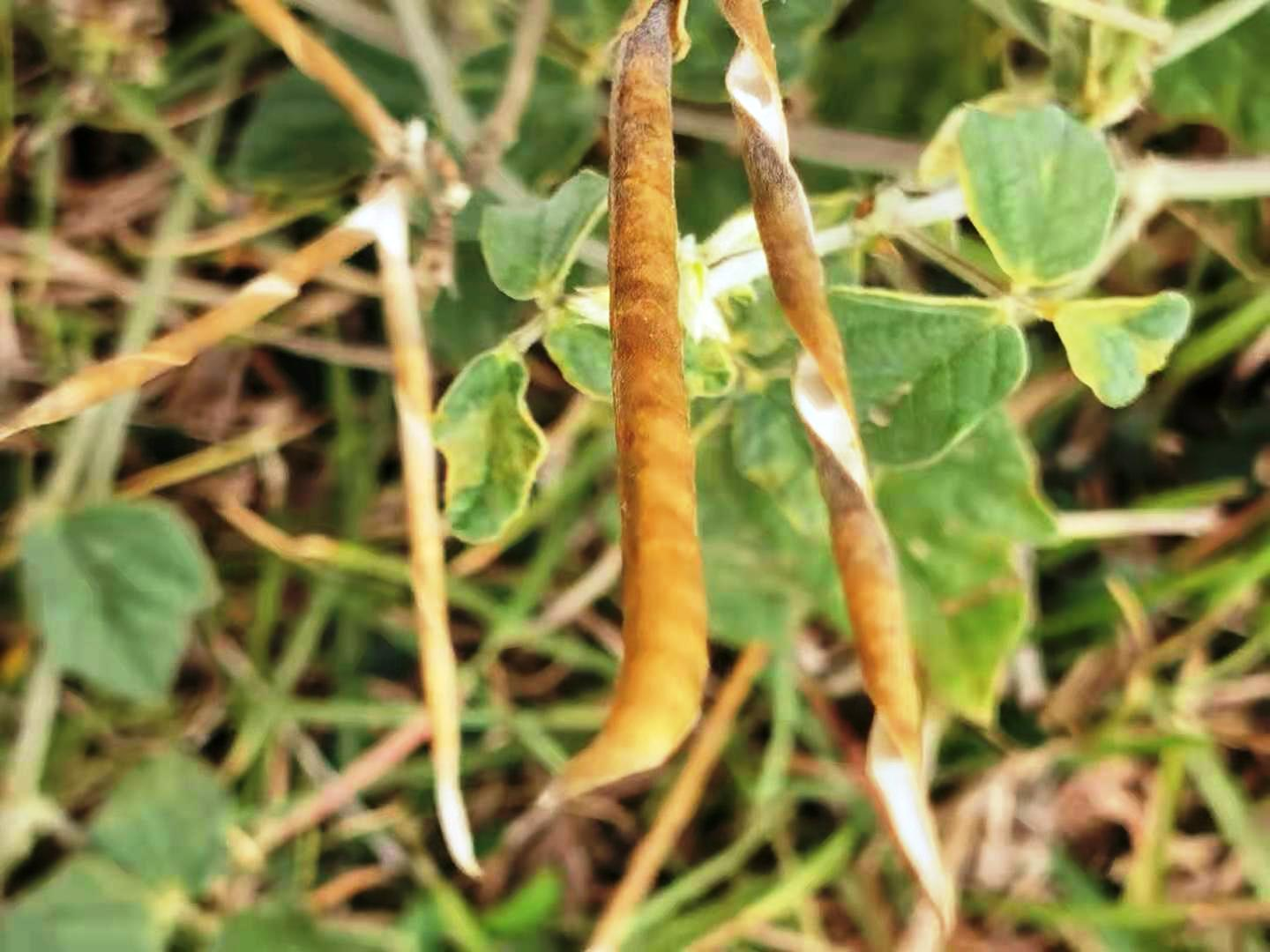

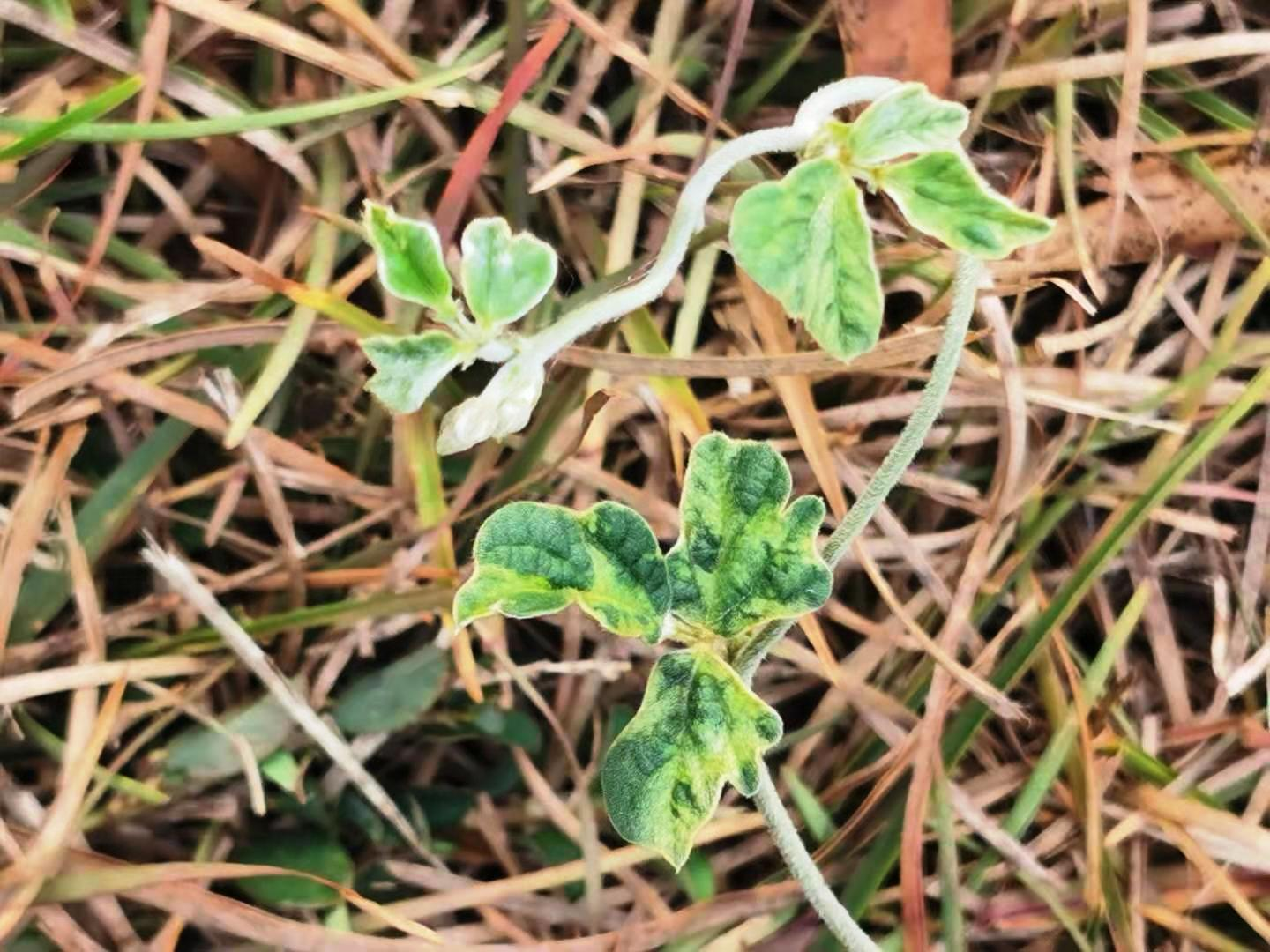

== See also ==
- Macroptilium lathyroides, a related species with similar characteristics
