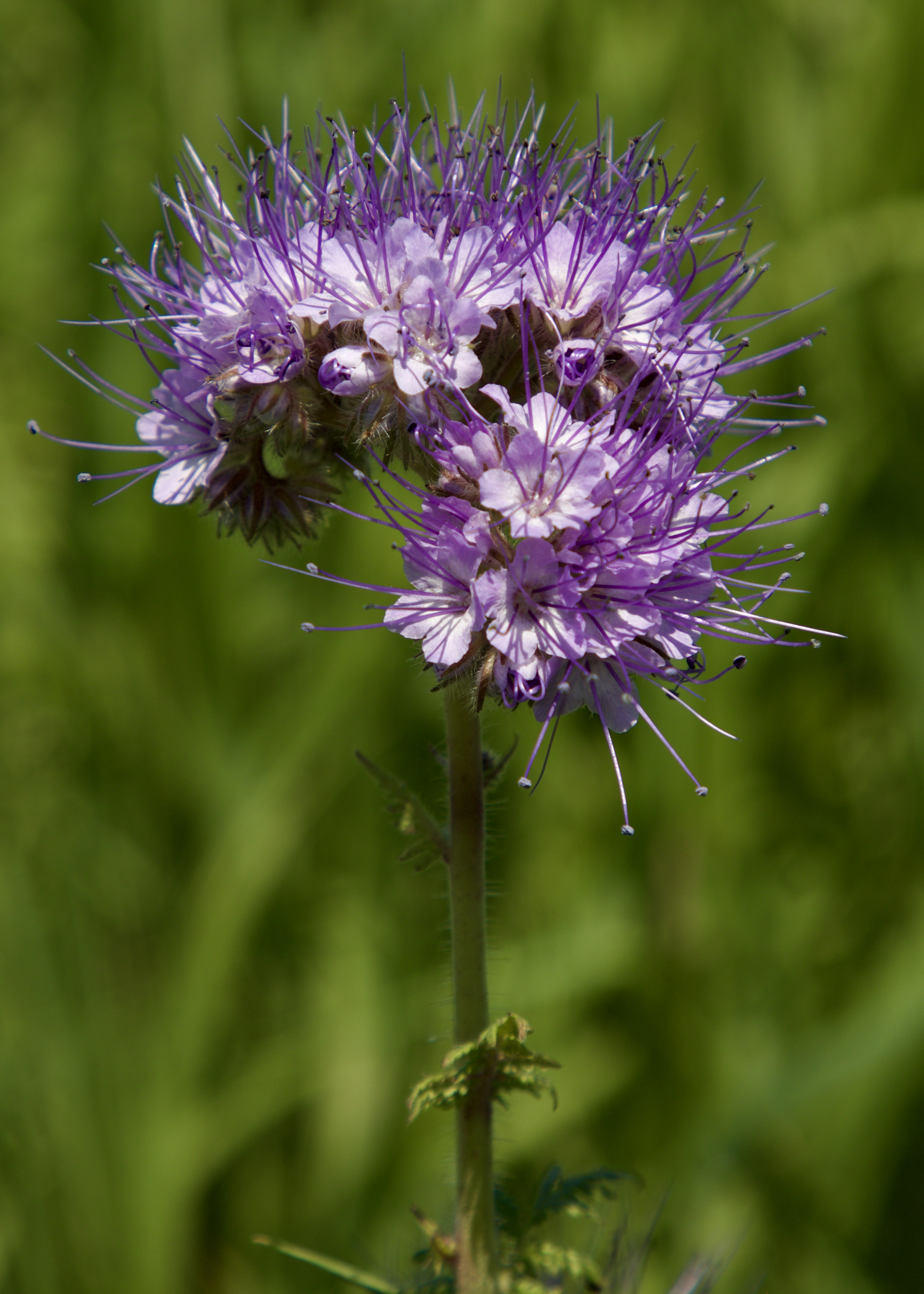

Scientific classification
- Kingdom: Plantae
- Clade: Tracheophytes
- Clade: Angiosperms
- Clade: Eudicots
- Clade: Asterids
- Order: Boraginales
- Family: Hydrophyllaceae
- Genus: Phacelia
- Species: P. tanacetifolia

Binomial name
- Phacelia tanacetifolia Benth.

= Phacelia tanacetifolia =

Species of herbaceous plant

Phacelia tanacetifolia is a species of flowering plant in the family Hydrophyllaceae, known by the common names lacy phacelia, tansy-leaf phacelia, blue tansy, purple tansy or fiddleneck (UK).

== Etymology ==
Phacelia is derived from Greek and means 'bundle', in reference to the clustered flowers, while tanacetifolia means 'with leaves resembling those of Tanacetum.'

== Description ==
Phacelia tanacetifolia is an annual that grows erect to a maximum height near 100 cm (40 in) with none to a few branches. The wild form is glandular and coated in short stiff hairs. The leaves, 20–200 mm (1–8 in), are mostly divided into smaller leaflets which are deeply and intricately cut into toothed lobes, giving them a lacy appearance. The dense and hairy inflorescence is a one-sided curving or coiling cyme of bell-shaped flowers in shades of blue and lavender. Each flower is just under a centimeter long and has protruding whiskery stamens.

The seeds are "negatively photoblastic", or photodormant, and will only germinate in darkness.

== Range and uses ==
=== Beneficial insects ===
Phacelia tanacetifolia is native to the Southwestern United States and northwestern Mexico. It is most common in the deserts of southern California at elevations below 1,500 m (5,000 ft), but may be occasionally found at much higher elevations.

It is used outside its native range in agriculture as a cover crop, a bee plant, an attractant for other beneficial insects, as a green manure and an ornamental plant. It is planted in vineyards and alongside crop fields, where it is valued for its long, coiling inflorescences of nectar-rich flowers which open in sequence, giving a long flowering period. It is a good insectary plant, attracting pollinators such as bumblebees and honey bees.

=== Biological pest control ===
It is also attractive to hoverflies (family Syrphidae), which are useful as biological pest control agents because they eat aphids and other pests.

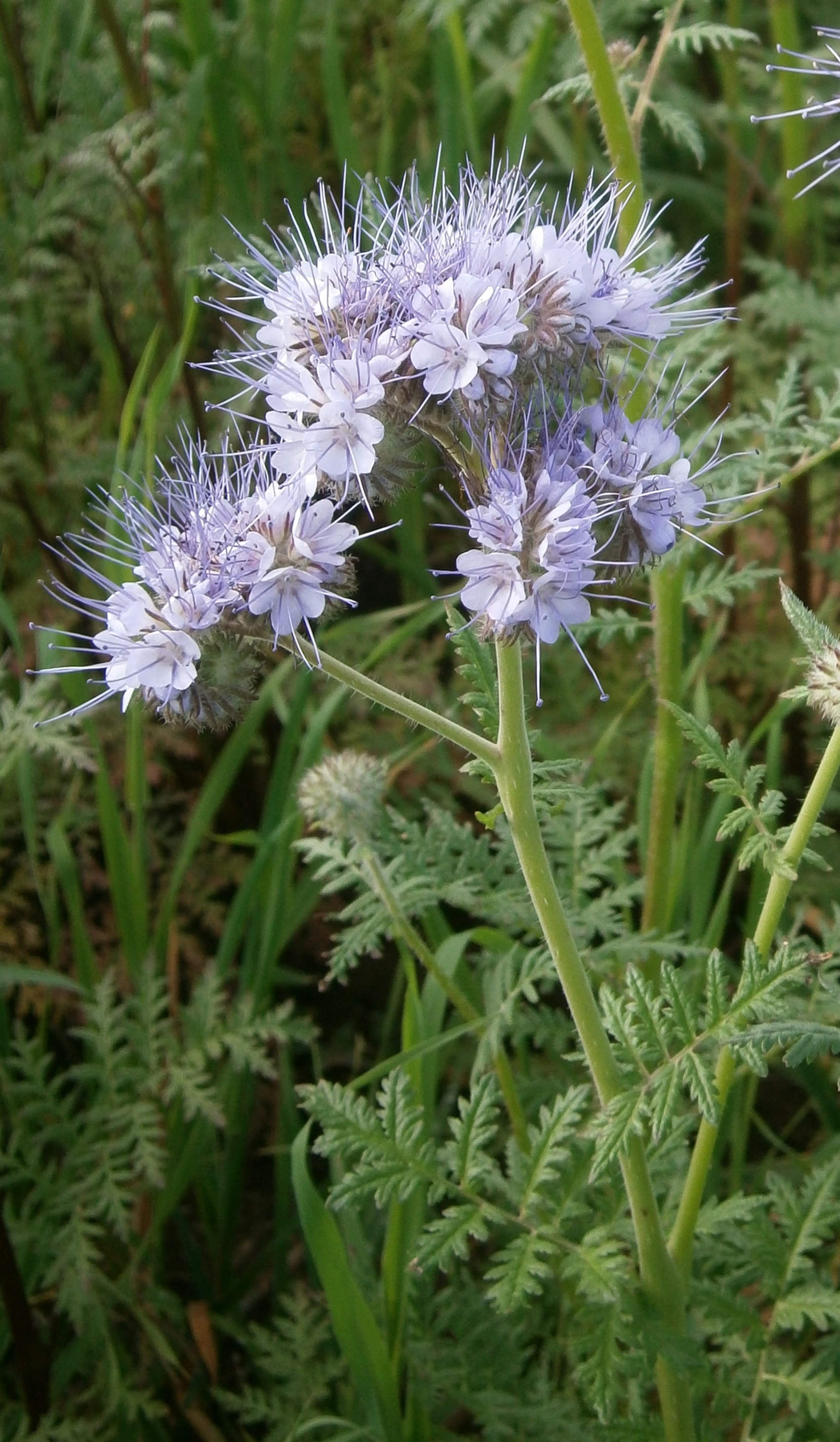

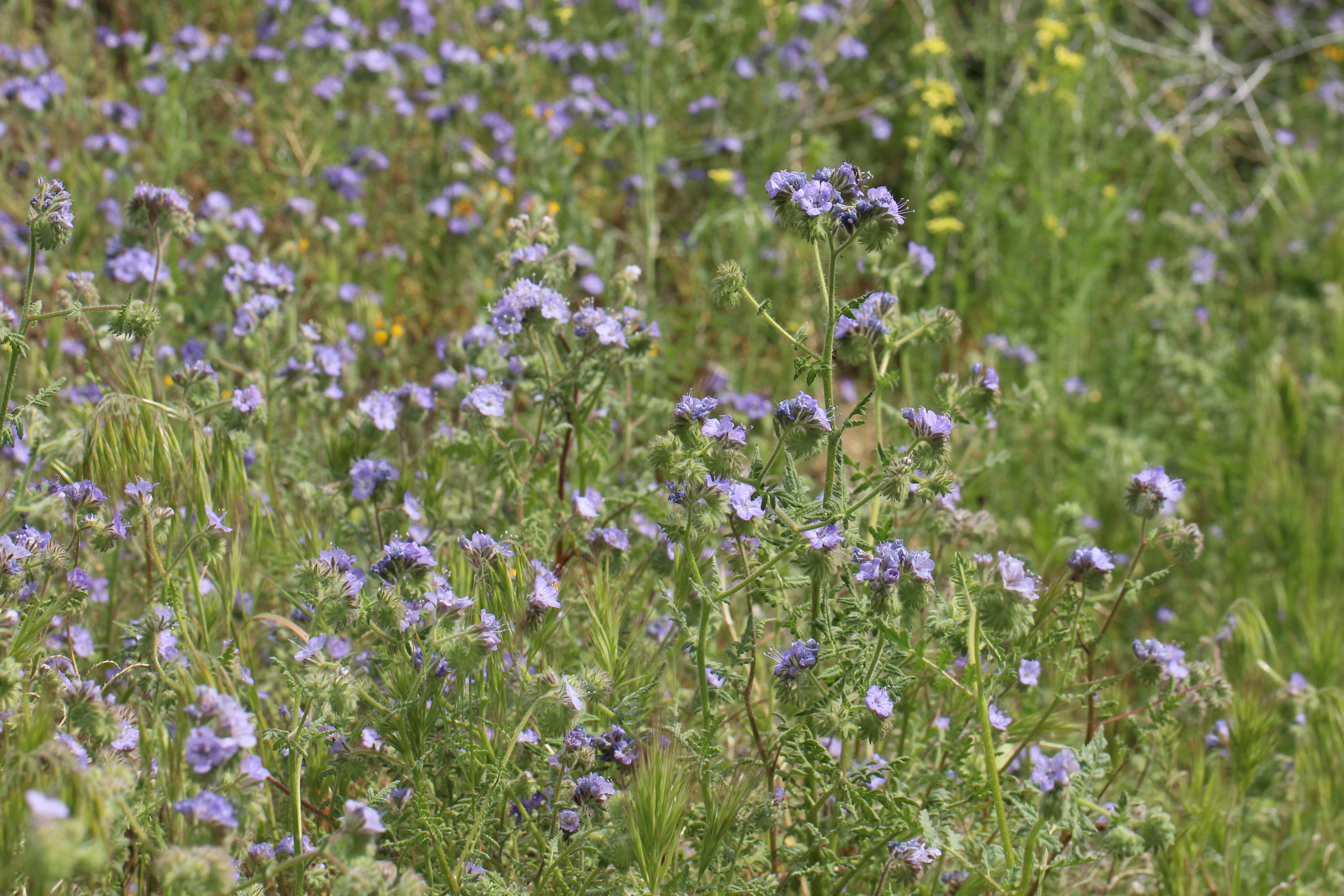

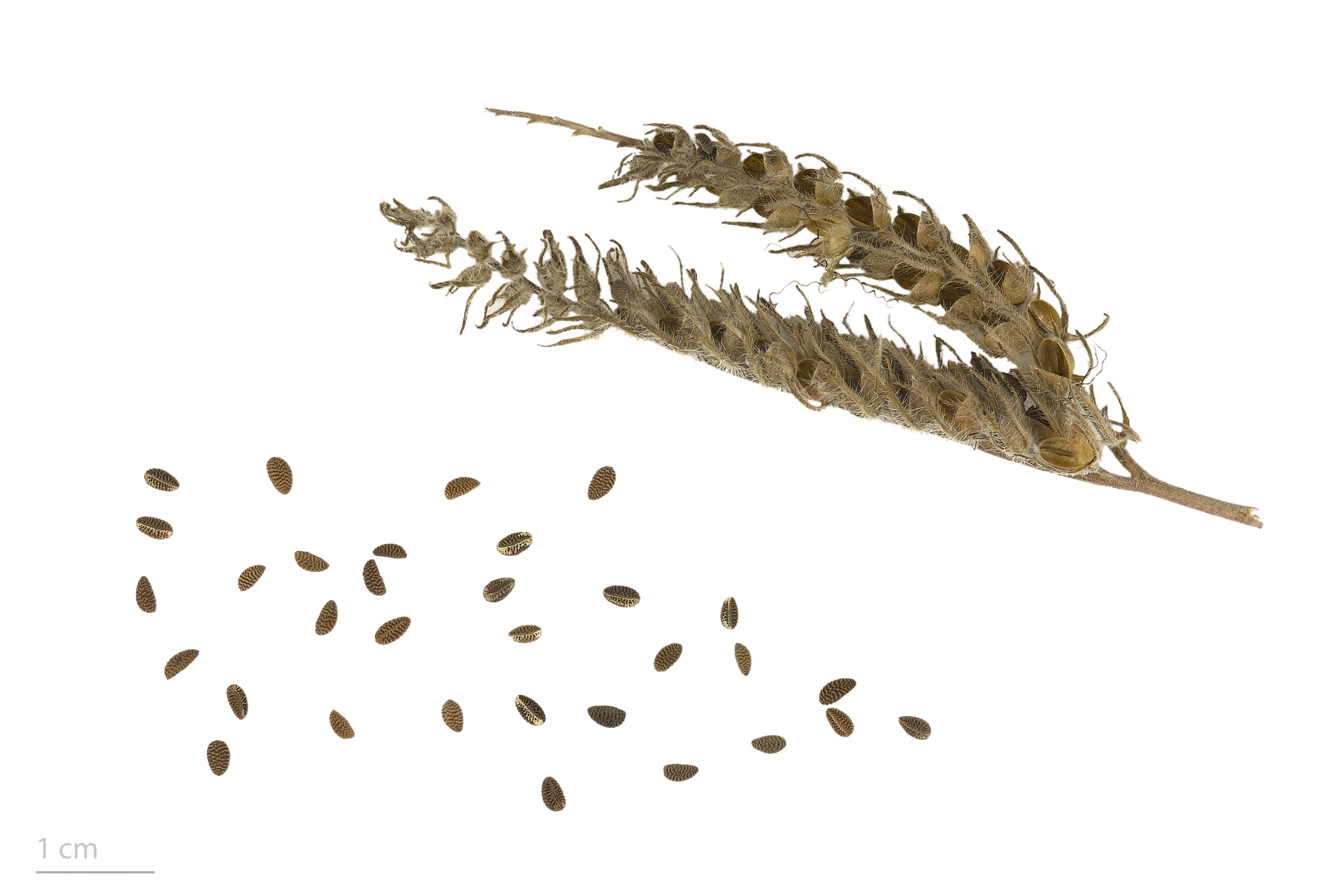
Seeds
