= Golf course turf =

Grass covering a golf course

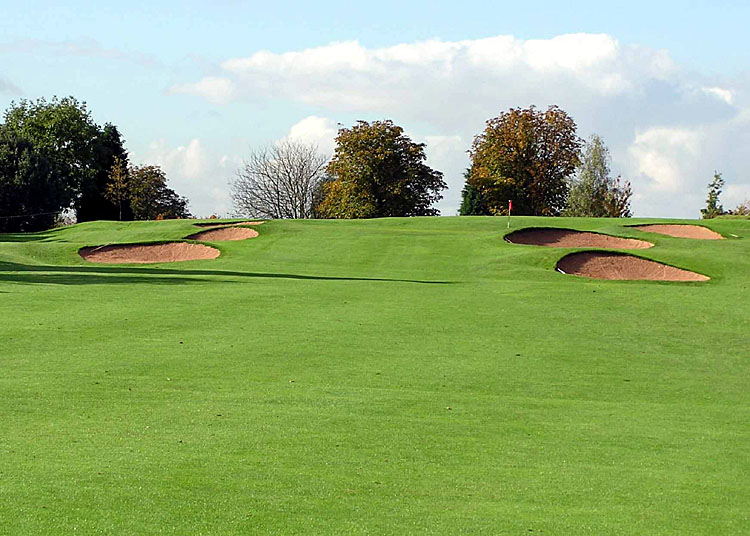
Smooth turf (green grass) at a golf course in England.

Golf course turf is the grass covering golf courses, which is used as a playing surface in the sport of golf. The grass is usually maintained by a greenskeeper to control weeds, insects with pesticides, plant fungal diseases with fungicides and to introduce nutrients such as nitrogen fertilization. The grass is kept at a constant height by mowing.

== Nutrient management ==
Nitrogen is the nutrient required in greatest amount by turfgrass. During an autumn season, rates of nitrogen (N) application should be lowered to consider previous application's residual available nitrate (NO^{−}_{3}) and mineralization (inorganic N), especially if there is substantial organic matter which releases its supply of sequestered N.

In the spring, heavy nitrogen applications for the first two months caused changes in color, but the nitrogen response by the grass was not maintained and a decrease in color was found as the growing season progressed. Spring fertilization can increase the tiller numbers of the grass compared to fall fertilization.

In the fall, application of nitrogen fertilizer can cause improved color retention and early spring coloration. Year-to-year differences in nitrogen loss during the fall result from differences in temperature and precipitation. Lower levels of nitrogen loss during fall can be found when it was warmer (more plant uptake) and dryer (less loss due to leaching).

The quality and color of turf can increase depending on nitrogen application amount. high rates create darker green turf. There is a positive correlation between high levels of nitrogen fertilizer used on turf and turf quality for any level of wear.

== Environmental quality ==
Groundwater and air quality should be considered when applying fertilizer and pesticides to turf.

=== Fertilizer ===
Turf growth at the time of nitrogen application affects nitrate (NO^{−}_{3}) leaching risk. For example, grass absorbed more N during active growth while uptake was limited in newly seeded turf. In another study, nitrogen applied after 15 September (of a northern-hemisphere autumn) caused relatively little plant growth, resulting in increased NO^{−}_{3} - N concentration in percolate water.

Areas made of sod undergo greater leaching than seeded turf plots. They attributed these differences to less root development in sod which resulted in less uptake of N by the plants. They also found that deep- rather than shallow-rooted grasses absorbed nitrogen more effectively. Additionally, the authors found that nitrogen uptake for loamy sand was greater than a sandy loam because the turf rooting systems were denser in the loam sand.

A highly soluble fertilizer, containing nitrogen in its nitrate form, such as ammonium nitrate, can create leaching three to seven times greater than United States Environmental Protection Agency (EPA) limits of (10 ppm) NO_{3}-N during a time of ten to twenty-five days following nitrogen application. Hummel and Waddington, 2001, found that a slow release nitrogen fertilizer application could provide nitrogen over a long duration and keep nitrogen leaching and volatilization losses to a minimum. A further study demonstrated that after fertilizer application, nitrogen losses exceeded EPA limits.

Photoperiod (the length of daylight) affects overall plant uptake. When the length of daylight gets shorter, grass undergoes less photosynthesis and uptakes less nitrogen. To prepare the surface for the following year, high levels of nitrogen application need to be undertaken at the end of the growing season (such as the southern United States) and increase the risk of nitrate leaching. For example, greater water percolate concentrations of NO3 - N resulted from a late autumn application programme during a New England experiment.

=== Pesticides ===
The antifungal cyproconazole was marketed as early as 1995 for use on sod farms and golf courses.

== See also ==
- Golf course, design and terminology
- Rolawn, suppliers of golf course turf
