= Fertigation =

Adding fertilizers to an irrigation system

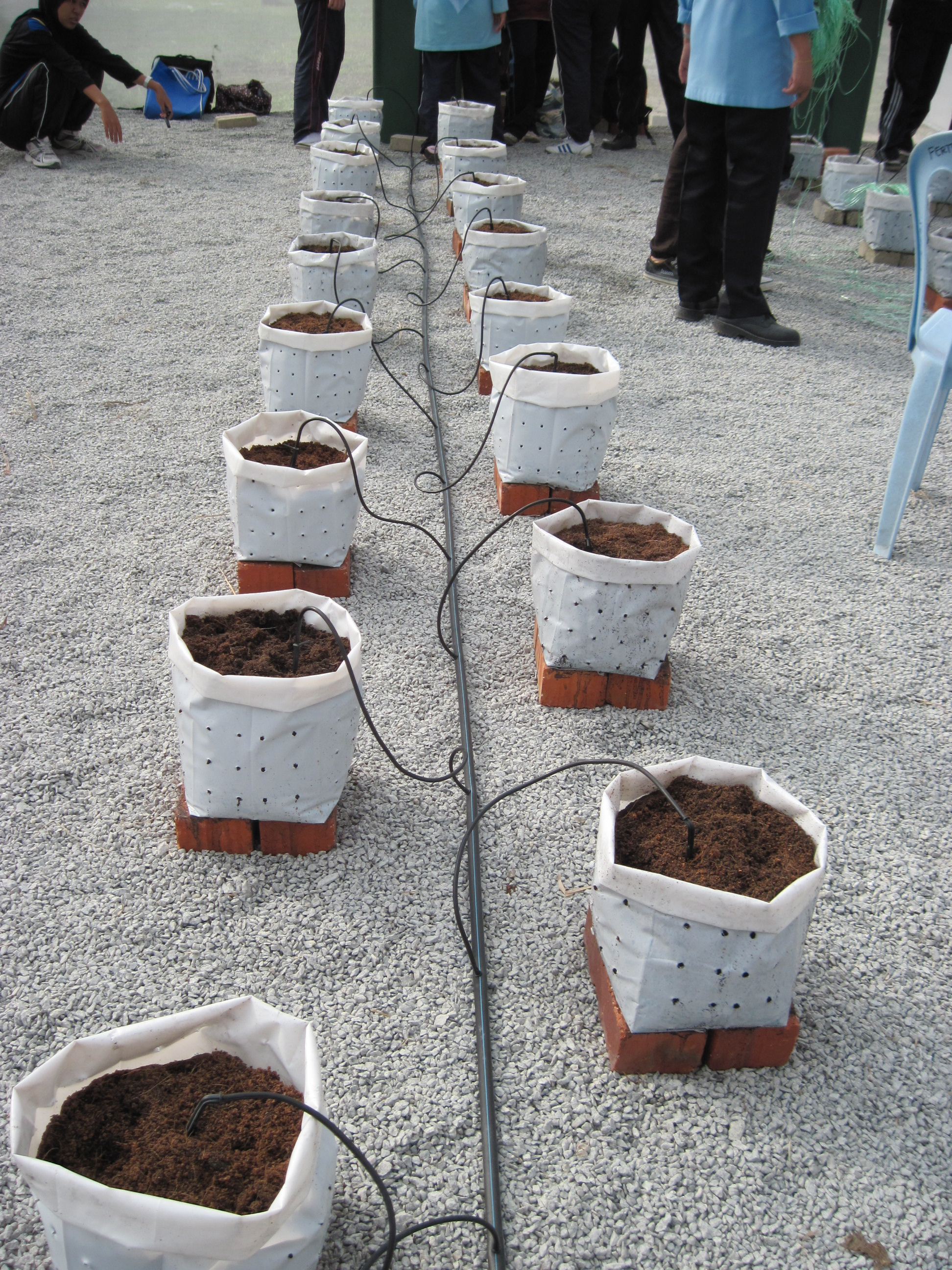
Fertigation using white poly bag

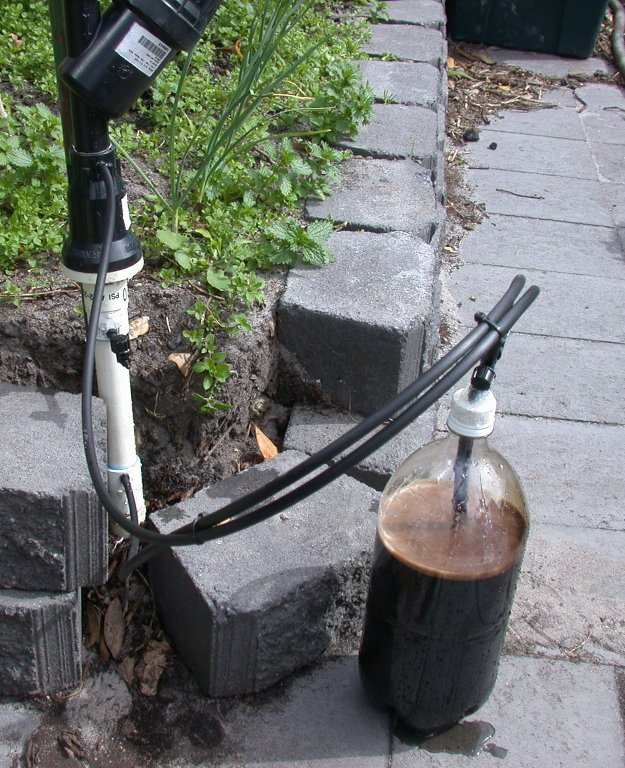
Fertilizer mixed with water connected to a drip irrigation system

Fertigation is the injection of fertilizers, used for soil amendments, water amendments and other water-soluble products into an irrigation system.

Chemigation, the injection of chemicals into an irrigation system, is related to fertigation. The two terms are sometimes used interchangeably however chemigation is generally a more controlled and regulated process due to the nature of the chemicals used. Chemigation often involves insecticides, herbicides, and fungicides, some of which pose health threat to humans, animals, and the environment.

== Uses ==
Fertigation is practiced extensively in commercial agriculture and horticulture. Fertigation is also increasingly being used for landscaping as dispenser units become more reliable and easier to use. Fertigation is used to add additional nutrients or to correct nutrient deficiencies detected in plant tissue analysis. It is usually practiced on the high-value crops such as vegetables, turf, fruit trees, and ornamentals.

== Commonly used chemicals ==
Nitrogen is the most commonly used plant nutrient. Naturally occurring nitrogen (N_{2}) is a diatomic molecule which makes up approximately 80% of the Earth's atmosphere. Most plants cannot directly consume diatomic nitrogen; therefore nitrogen must be contained as a component of other chemical substances which plants can consume. Commonly, anhydrous ammonia, ammonium nitrate, and urea are used as bioavailable sources of nitrogen. Other nutrients needed by plants include phosphorus and potassium. Like nitrogen, plants require these substances to live but they must be contained in other chemical substances such as monoammonium phosphate or diammonium phosphate to serve as bioavailable nutrients. A common source of potassium is muriate of potash which is chemically potassium chloride. A soil fertility analysis is used to determine which of the more stable nutrients should be used.

Fungicides are used on sod (or turf), like golf courses and sodfarms. One of the earliest was cyproconazole marketed in 1995.

== Advantages ==
The benefits of fertigation methods over conventional or drop-fertilizing methods include:

- Increased nutrient absorption by plants.
- Accurate placement of nutrient, where the water goes the nutrient goes as well.
- Ability to "micro dose", feeding the plants just enough so nutrients can be absorbed and are not left to be washed down to storm water next time it rains.
- Reduction of fertilizer, chemicals, and water needed.
- Reduced leaching of chemicals into the water supply.
- Reduced water consumption due to the plant's increased root mass's ability to trap and hold water.
- Application of nutrients can be controlled at the precise time and rate necessary.
- Minimized risk of the roots contracting soil borne diseases through the contaminated soil.
- Reduction of soil erosion issues as the nutrients are pumped through the water drip system. Leaching is decreased often through methods used to employ fertigation.

== Disadvantages ==
- Concentration of the solution may decrease as the fertilizer dissolves; this depends on equipment selection. If poorly selected may lead to poor nutrient placement.
- The water supply for fertigation is to be kept separate from the domestic water supply to avoid contamination.
- Possible pressure loss in the main irrigation line.
- The process is dependent on the water supply's non-restriction by drought rationing.

== Methods used ==
- Drip irrigation – Less wasteful than sprinklers. It is not only more efficient for fertilizer usage but can also be for maximizing nutrient uptake in plants like cotton. Drip irrigation using fertigation can also increase yield and quality of fruit and flowers, especially in subsurface drip systems rather than above surface drip tape.
- Sprinkler systems – Increases leaf and fruit quality.
- Continuous application – Fertilizer is supplied at a constant rate.
- Three-stage application – Irrigation starts without fertilizers. Fertilizers are applied later in the process once the ground is wet, and the final stage clears fertilizers out of the irrigation system.
- Proportional application – Injection rate is proportional to water discharge rate.
- Quantitative application – Nutrient solution is applied in a calculated amount to each irrigation block.
- Other methods of application include the lateral move, the traveler gun, and solid set systems.

== System design ==
Fertigation assists distribution of fertilizers for farmers. The simplest type of fertigation system consists of a tank with a pump, distribution pipes, capillaries, and a dripper pen.

All systems should be placed on a raised or sealed platform, not in direct contact with the earth. Each system should also be fitted with chemical spill trays.

Because of the potential risk of contamination in the potable (drinking) water supply, a backflow prevention device is required for most fertigation systems. Backflow requirements may vary greatly. Therefore, it is very important to understand the proper level of backflow prevention required by law. In the United States, the minimum backflow protection is usually determined by state regulation. Each city or town may set the level of protection required.

== See also ==
- Drip irrigation
- Foliar feeding
- Soil defertilisation
- Sustainable agriculture
- Water conservation
- Fertilizer injector

== Bibliography ==
1. Asadi, M.E., 1998. "Water and nitrogen management to reduce impact of nitrates". Proceedings of the 5th International Agricultural Engineering conference, December 7–10, Bangkok, Thailand, PP.602–616.
2. Asadi, M.E., Clemente, R.S.2000. "Impact of nitrogen fertilizer use on the environment". Proceedings of the 6th International Agricultural Engineering Conference, December 4–7, Bangkok, Thailand. PP.413–423.
3. Asadi, M.E., Clemente, R.S., Gupta, A.D., Loof, R., and Hansen, G.K. 2002. "Impacts of fertigation Via sprinkler irrigation on nitrate leaching and corn yield on an acid - sulphate soil in Thailand. Agricultural Water Management" 52(3): 197–213.
4. Asadi, M.E., 2004. "Optimum utilization of water and nitrogen fertilizers in sustainable agriculture". Programme and Abstracts N2004. The Third International Nitrogen Conference. October 12–16, Nanjing, China. p. 68.
5. Asadi, M.E., 2005. "Fertigation as an engineering system to enhance nitrogen fertilizer efficiency". Proceedings of the Second International Congress: Information Technology in Agriculture, Food and Environment, (ITAFE), October 12–14, Adana, Turkey, pp. 525–532.
6. Department of Natural Resources, Environment, "Fertigation systems." Web. 4 May 2009.
7. Hanson, Blaine R., Hopmans, Jan, Simunek, Jirka. "Effect of Fertigation Strategy on Nitrogen Availability and Nitrate Leaching using Microirrigation". HortScience 2005 40: 1096
8. North Carolina Department of Agriculture and Consumer Services, www.ncagr.com/fooddrug/pesticid/chemigation2003.pdf "Chemigation & Fertigation". (2003) 4 May 2009.
9. Neilsen, Gerry, Kappel, Frank, Neilsen, Denise. "Fertigation Method Affects Performance of `Lapins' Sweet Cherry on Gisela 5 Rootstock". HortScience 2004 39: 1716–1721
10. NSW department of primary industries, "Horticultural fertigation". 2000.
11. Suhaimi, M. Yaseer; Mohammad, A.M.; Mahamud, S.; Khadzir, D. (July 18, 2012). "Effects of substrates on growth and yield of ginger cultivated using soilless culture", Journal of Tropical Agriculture and Food Science, Malaysian Agricultural Research and Development Institute 40(2) pp. 159 - 168. (Selangor)
