= Soil defertilisation =

Practice of reducing soil fertility

Soil defertilisation refers to the practice of reducing soil fertility in order to reduce the number of plants that can grow on that soil. It is often done on land not intended for agriculture, such as city parks.

== Benefit ==
On land not intended for agriculture, such as city parks or other communal spaces, undesired plants (weeds) can become a nuisance to the city's communal services, costing effort and money.

In some cases, along with soil defertilisation, the soil's pH and water content can be altered. This may create a much different environment, allowing more specialised plants/vegetation to grow and take hold.

== In practice ==
Soil defertilisation is done by growing specific cover crops (e.g., Phacelia, Sinapis alba, Lolium multiflorum) on them and then, instead of ploughing them under, removing them from the soil. By doing this, the nutrients that have accumulated in the crops are removed together with the crops. The crops may be used on other land that needs to be fertilsed (instead of defertilised), for example, agricultural land.

== See also ==
- Soil fertilisation
