= List of Italian donkey breeds =

This is a list of some of the breeds of ass or donkey considered in Italy to be wholly or partly of Italian origin. Some may have complex or obscure histories, so inclusion here does not necessarily imply that a breed is predominantly or exclusively Italian.

== Principal breeds ==
- Amiata
- Asinara
- Grigio Siciliano, or Asino Ferrante
- Martina Franca
- Pantesco, or Asino di Pantelleria
- Ragusano
- Romagnolo
- Sardinian

== Minor and extinct breeds ==
- Argentato di Sologno
- Basilicata donkey|Asino della Basilicata
- Asino delle Marche
- Asino dell'Irpinia
- Asino Sardo Grigio Crociato
- Baio Lucano
- Cariovilli
- Castel Morrone
- Emiliano
- Grigio viterbese
- Pugliese
- Sant'Alberto
- Sant'Andrea
- San Domenico
- San Francesco
