= Biuret amidohydrolase =

Class of enzymes

Identifiers
- EC no.: 3.5.1.84

Databases
- BRENDA: enzyme data
- ExPASy: NiceZyme view
- KEGG: enzyme entry
- MetaCyc: metabolic pathway
- Rhea: reactions
- PDB structures: RCSB PDB PDBe PDBsum
- Gene Ontology: AmiGO / QuickGO
Search
- PMC: articles
- PubMed: articles
- NCBI: proteins

Biuret amidohydrolase (EC 3.5.1.84) is an enzyme characterised from bacteria that catalyzes the hydrolysis of biuret to allophanic acid and ammonia:

biuret
H_{2}O
NH_{3}
allophanic acid

The reaction is part of the breakdown pathway for cyanuric acid and the product allophanic acid can also give urea and carbon dioxide spontaneously under the reaction conditions. Triazine herbicides are metabolised in this pathway.

This enzyme is a hydrolase, one acting on carbon-nitrogen bonds other than peptide bonds, specifically in linear amides. The systematic name of this enzyme class is biuret amidohydrolase.
