= Diamidophosphate =

Names
- IUPAC name diaminophosphinate

Identifiers
3D model (JSmol)	Interactive image
ChemSpider	10449245
PubChem CID	23280244
CompTox Dashboard (EPA)	DTXSID201337335
- InChI: InChI==1S/H5N2O2P/c1-5(2,3)4/h(H5,1,2,3,4)/p-1 Key: ANCLJVISBRWUTR-UHFFFAOYSA-M
- SMILES: NP(=O)(N)[O-]

Properties
Chemical formula	H_{4}N_{2}O_{2}P
Molar mass	95.018 g·mol^{−1}

Related compounds
Other anions	Thiophosphordiamidic acid
Other cations	Phosphordiamidic acid
Related	phosphorotriamide phosphoramidic acid
- Except where otherwise noted, data are given for materials in their standard state (at 25 °C [77 °F], 100 kPa). Infobox references

Diamidophosphate (DAP) is the simplest phosphorodiamidate ion, with formula PO_{2}(NH_{2})_{2}^{−}. It is a phosphorylating ion and was first used for the phosphorylation of sugars in aqueous medium. DAP has attracted interest in the area of primordial chemistry.

== Salts ==
Several salts of the formula MPO_{2}(NH_{2})_{2}(H_{2}O)_{x} are known.

- The sodium salt can be made by base hydrolysis of phenyl phosphorodiamidate. It crystallises as a hexahydrate. It can be dehydrated.
- The silver salt AgPO_{2}(NH_{2})_{2} can react using double decomposition with bromides forming other salts.
- The potassium dithiophosphate salt KPO_{2}(NH_{2})_{2} is also known.
- Phosphorodiamidic acid crystallizes as a trihydrate.

== Reactions ==
Heating anhydrous sodium diamidophosphate causes polymerization:

- At 160 °C, Na_{2}P_{2}O_{4}(NH)(NH_{2})_{2}, Na_{3}P_{3}O_{6}(NH)_{2}(NH_{2})_{2}, Na_{4}P_{4}O_{8}(NH)_{3}(NH_{2})_{2}, Na_{5}P_{5}O_{10}(NH)_{4}(NH_{2})_{2} and Na_{6}P_{6}O_{12}(NH)_{5}(NH_{2})_{2} are produced. These substances contain P-N-P backbones. These can be separated by paper chromatography.
- At 200 °C the hexa-phosphate is produced.
- At 250 °C the typical chain length is 18.

Heating hydrated salts induces the loss of ammonia to form oligophosphates and polyphosphates.

Diamidophosphate inhibits urease enzymes by blocking up the active site, binding to two nickel centers. Diamidophosphate mimics the urea hydrolysis intermediate.

Diamidophosphate is tribasic, and the amine groups may also lose hydrogen to form more metallic salts. With silver, further reactions can yield explosive salts: tetrasilver orthodiamidophosphate (AgO)_{3}P(NH_{2})NHAg, and pentasilver orthodiamidophosphate (AgO)_{3}P(NHAg)_{2}.

=== Organic esters and amides ===
Phenyl phosphorodiamidate, an inhibitor of urease, is a controlled release fertilizer.

Numerous organic derivatives are known. One example is phenyl phosphorodiamidate.

=== Reactions with nucleosides ===
DAP phosphorylates deoxynucleosides (the building blocks of DNA, and at the same time initiates polymerization to make DNA. DAP facilitates the synthesis of larger RNA sequences (ribozymes) from smaller RNA strands. Other nitrogenous derivatives of phosphorus derivatives have also been proposed in this context in a review article.

== See also ==
- Abiogenesis

== Other reading ==
- H. N. Stokes (1894). "On Diamidoorthophosphoric and Diamidotrihydroxyphosphoric Acids". American Chemical Journal. 16 (2): 123.
