= Romagnolo =

Romagnol or Romagnolo is the demonym of Romagna, may refer to:

- The Romagnol language or dialect
- Romagnolo donkey
- Romagnolo (grape variety) (see Cerveteri)
- Credito Romagnolo, a defunct subsidiary of Credito Italiano, a predecessor of UniCredit
