= Ragusano =

Ragusano, referencing the geographic region around Ragusa, Italy, may refer to:

- Ragusano cheese
- Ragusano donkey
- Asprinio Bianco, and Italian wine grape also known as Ragusano.
