= Phosphoramides =

Class of chemical compounds

Phosphoramides are derivatives of phosphoramide

Phosphoramides are a class of phosphorus compounds with the formula O=P(NR_{2})_{3-n}R_{n} (R = anything). They can be considered derivatives of phosphoric acid where OH groups have been replaced with an amino or R-substituted amino group. In practise the term is commonly confined to the phosphoric triamides (P(=O)(NR_{2})_{3}), essentially phosphoramide and derivatives thereof. Derivatives with the general structures P(=O)(OH)(NR_{2})_{2} or P(=O)(OH)_{2}(NR_{2}) are usually referred to as phosphoramidic acids.

== Examples ==
- Na[PO_{2}(OH)(NH_{2})], the lightly studied parent monoamide of phosphoric acid.
- Phenyl phosphorodiamidate, a phosphoramide but also a phosphate ester, is used in agriculture to enhance the effectiveness of urea-based fertilizers.
- Hexamethylphosphoramide (HMPA) is a polar solvent.
- Cyclophosphamide, Chlorambucil, Ifosfamide, and Trofosfamide are phosphoramide-containing anticancer drugs
