= Amiatina =

Breed of donkey

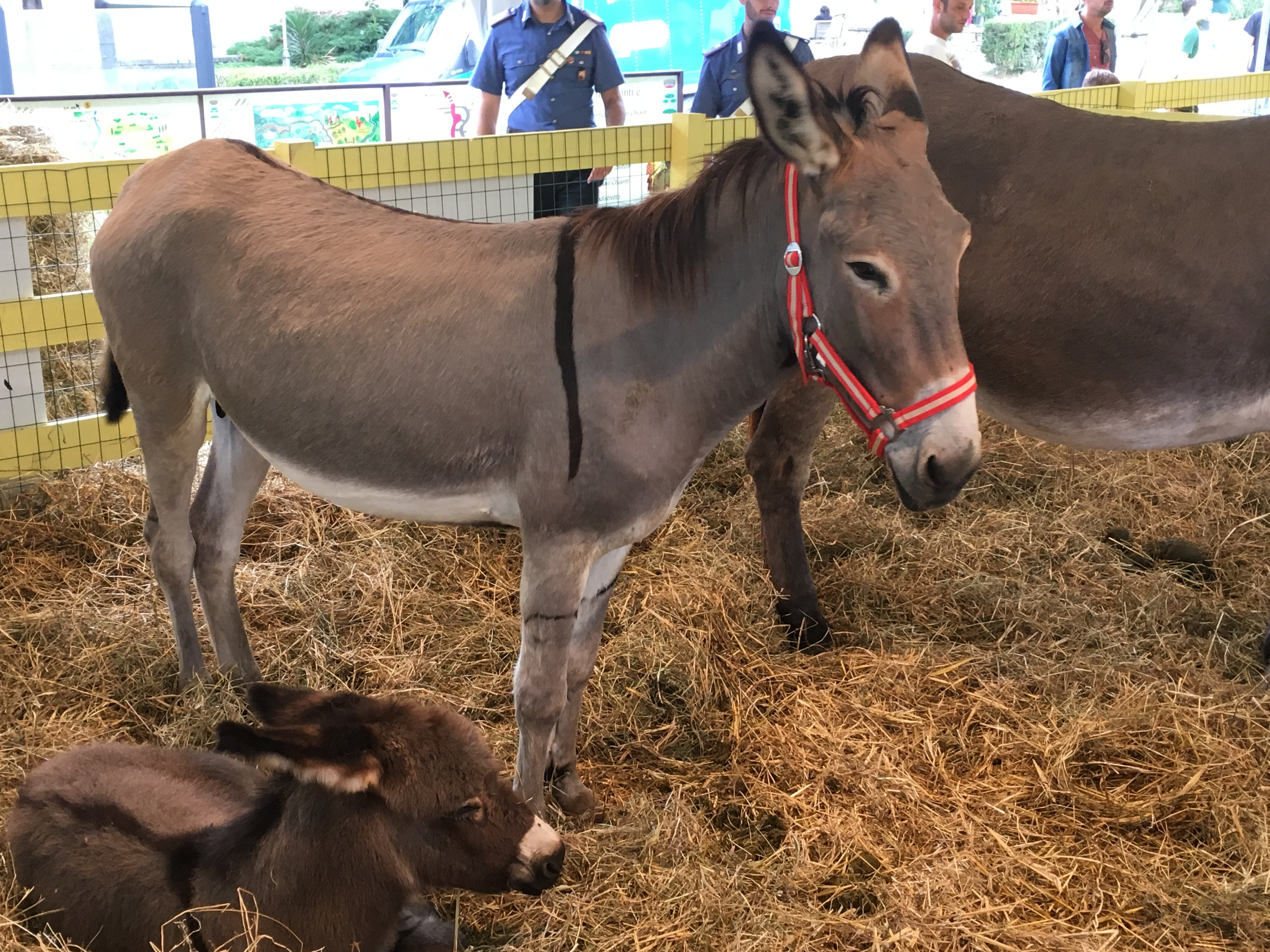
- Conservation status: FAO: endangered
- Other names: Asino dell'Amiata
- Country of origin: Italy
- Distribution: mainly in Tuscany
- Use: transport; burden; light draught; meat; hippotherapy

Traits
- Weight: Male: 200 kg; Female: 150 kg
- Height: Male: 130–140 cm; Female: 125–135 cm

Classification
- MIPAAF: Breed standard

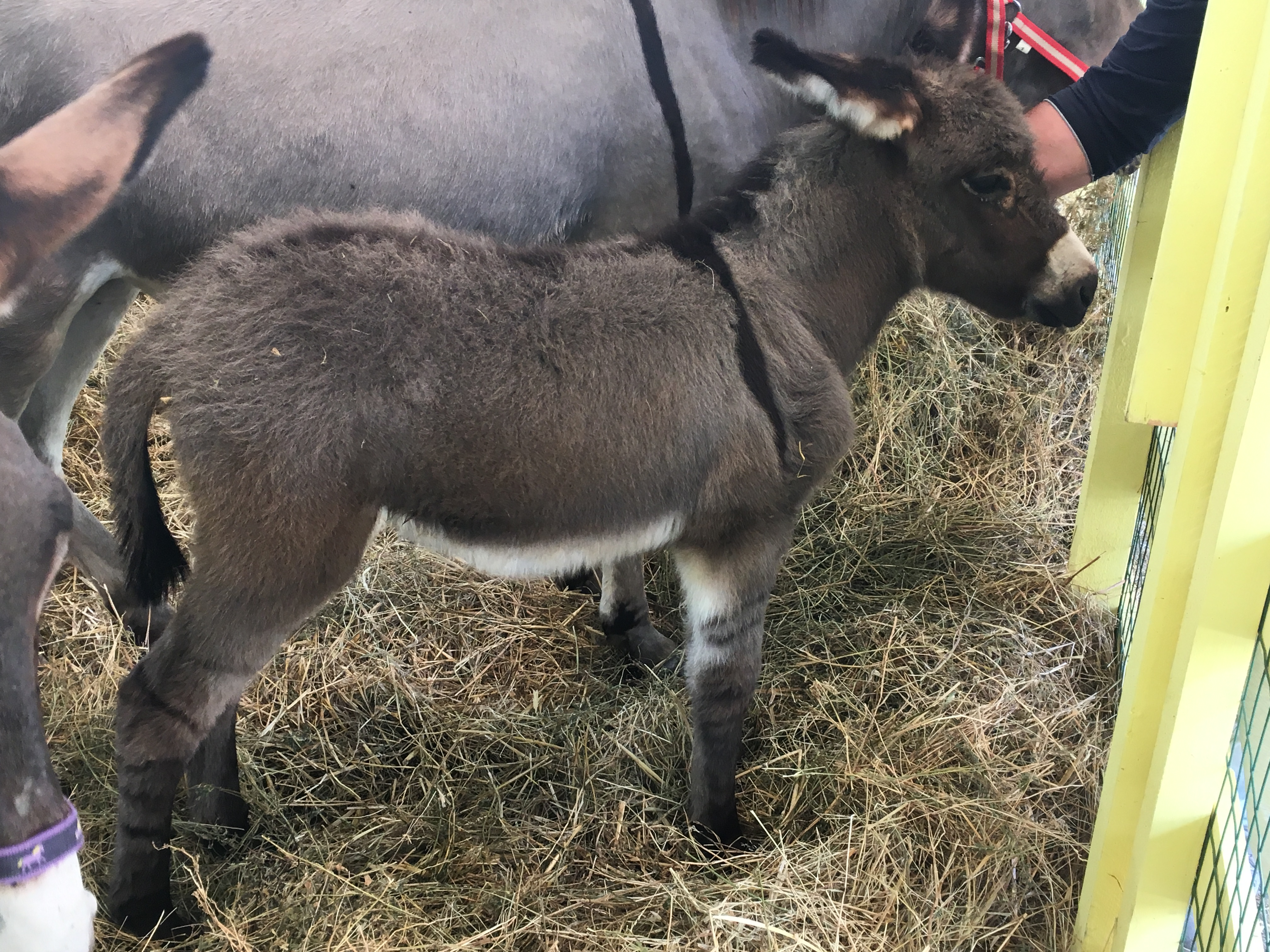
Amiatina foal at the Rural Festival of Gaiole in Chianti in Tuscany, 2016

The Amiatina or Italian: Asino dell'Amiata is a breed of donkey from Tuscany in central Italy. It is particularly associated with Monte Amiata in the provinces of Siena and Grosseto, but is distributed throughout Tuscany. There are also populations in Liguria and in Campania. It is one of the eight autochthonous donkey breeds of limited distribution recognised by the Ministero delle Politiche Agricole Alimentari e Forestali, the Italian ministry of agriculture and forestry.

== History ==
The Amiatina was numerous in the early part of the twentieth century; before the Second World War the population in the provinces of Grosseto and Perugia alone was over 8000. In the years following the War it came close to extinction. From 1956 the Deposito Stalloni (later the Istituto di Incremento Ippico) of Pisa selectively bred it in the province of Grosseto. A breeders' association was founded in 1993. In 1995 the registered population was 89. In 2006 the total number registered was 1082, of which about 60% were in Tuscany. The Amiatina was listed as "endangered" by the Food and Agriculture Organization of the United Nations in 2007.

== Characteristics ==
The Amiatina is intermediate in size between large breeds such as the Martina Franca and the Ragusano and small ones such as the Sarda. It rarely exceeds 140 cm at the withers. The coat is mouse-grey, with well-defined primitive markings – dorsal and shoulder stripes forming a cross, and zebra stripes on the legs. It is a strong and rustic breed, capable of foraging on harsh marginal terrain. Management is almost always free range.
