= Proton-gated urea channel =

Inner-membrane protein

Acid-activated urea/amide channel
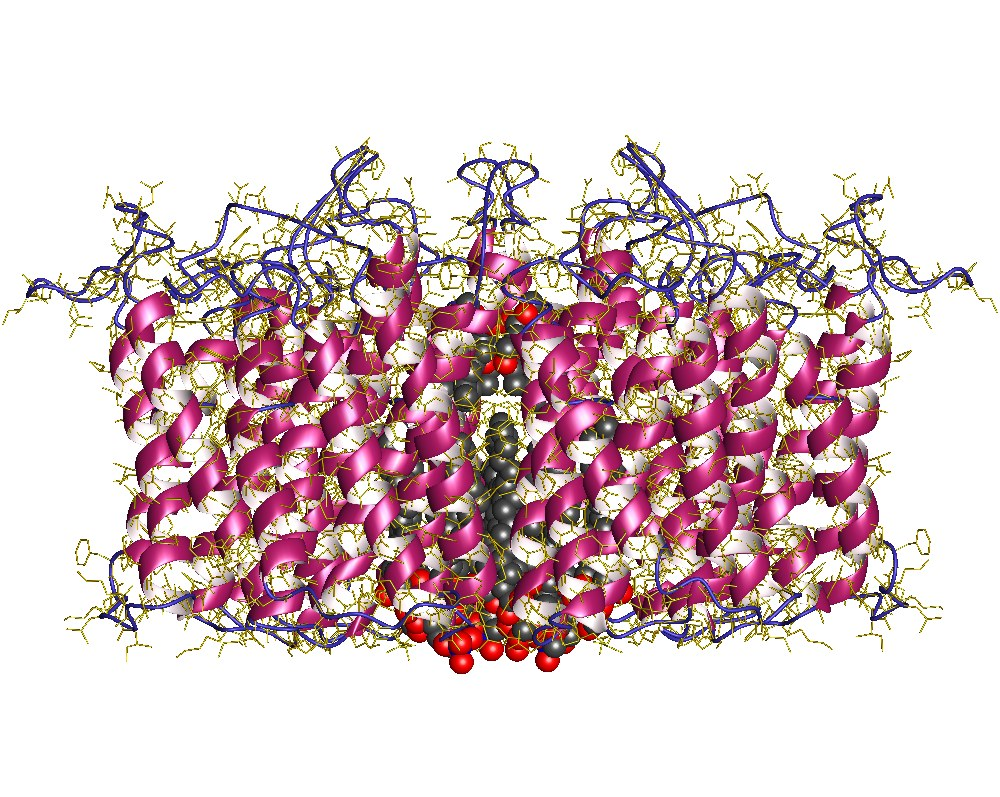
- Urea channel hexamer (side view) from Helicobacter pylori

Identifiers
- Symbol: UAC
- Pfam: PF02293
- TCDB: 1.A.29
- OPM superfamily: 299
- OPM protein: 3ux4
Available protein structures:
- PDB: PF02293 (ECOD; PDBsum)
- AlphaFold: PF02293

The proton-gated urea channel is an inner-membrane protein essential for the survival to Helicobacter pylori. It enables the rapid influx of urea into the bacterium. It is closed at pH 7.0 and fully open at pH 5.0. Urease activity buffers the periplasm to pH 6.1. Using multiwavelength anomalous dispersion (MAD), its structure, a compact hexameric ring about 95 Å in diameter and 45 A ̊ in height, was determined. The centre is filled with a lipid plug that forms an asymmetric bilayer. Amino residues that can be protonated in the periplasmic domain are important for proton sensing or gating.
