= Romagnolo donkey =

Italian breed of donkey

Romagnolo
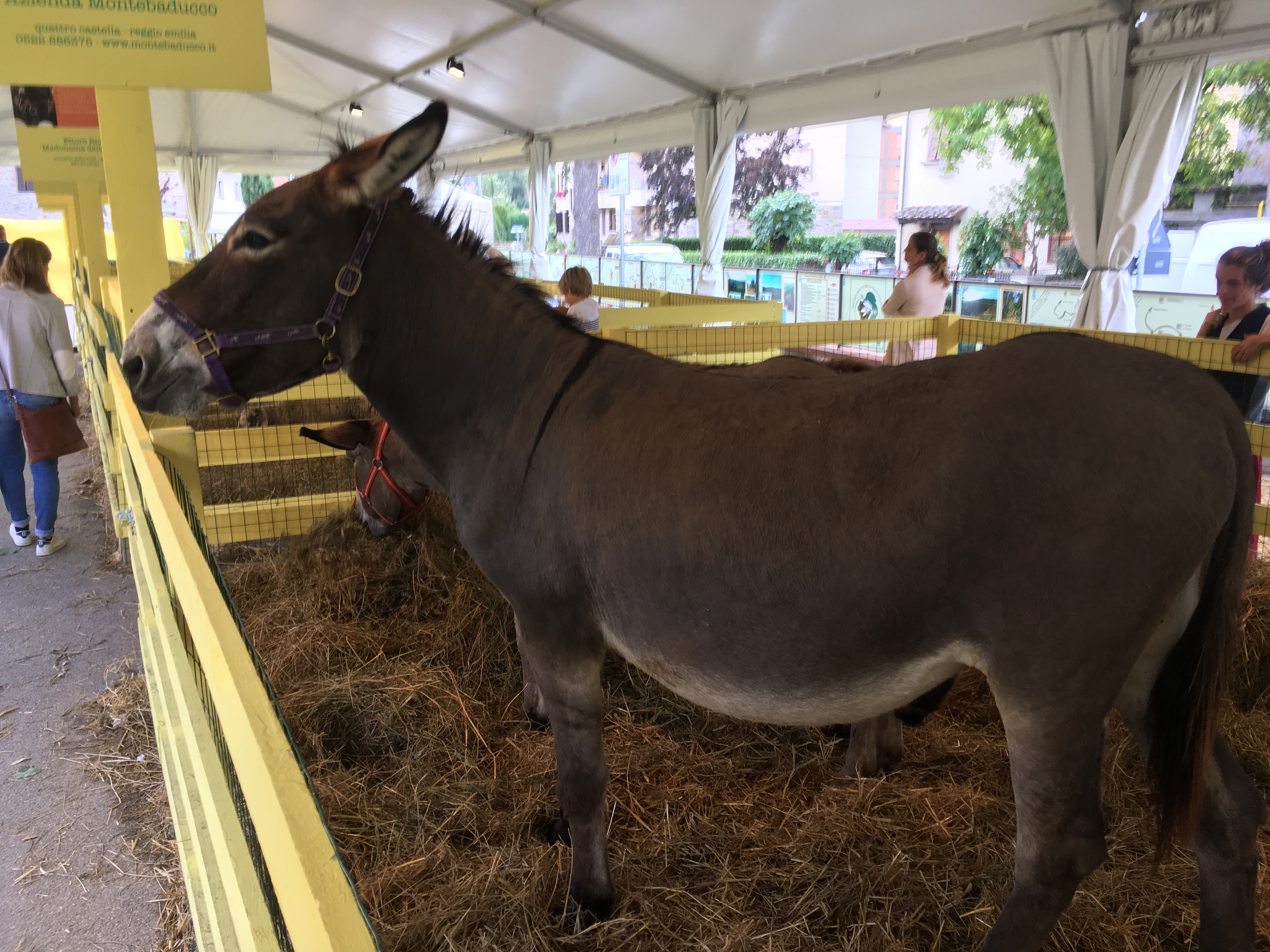
- Conservation status: FAO (2007): critical; DAD-IS (2024): at risk/endangered
- Other names: Asino Romagnolo; Romagnola; Asino di Sant'Alberto
- Country of origin: Italy
- Distribution: Province of Forlì-Cesena; Metropolitan City of Bologna; Province of Ravenna; Province of Reggio Emilia
- Standard: MASAF

Traits
- Height: Male: 135–155 cm; Female: 130–145 cm

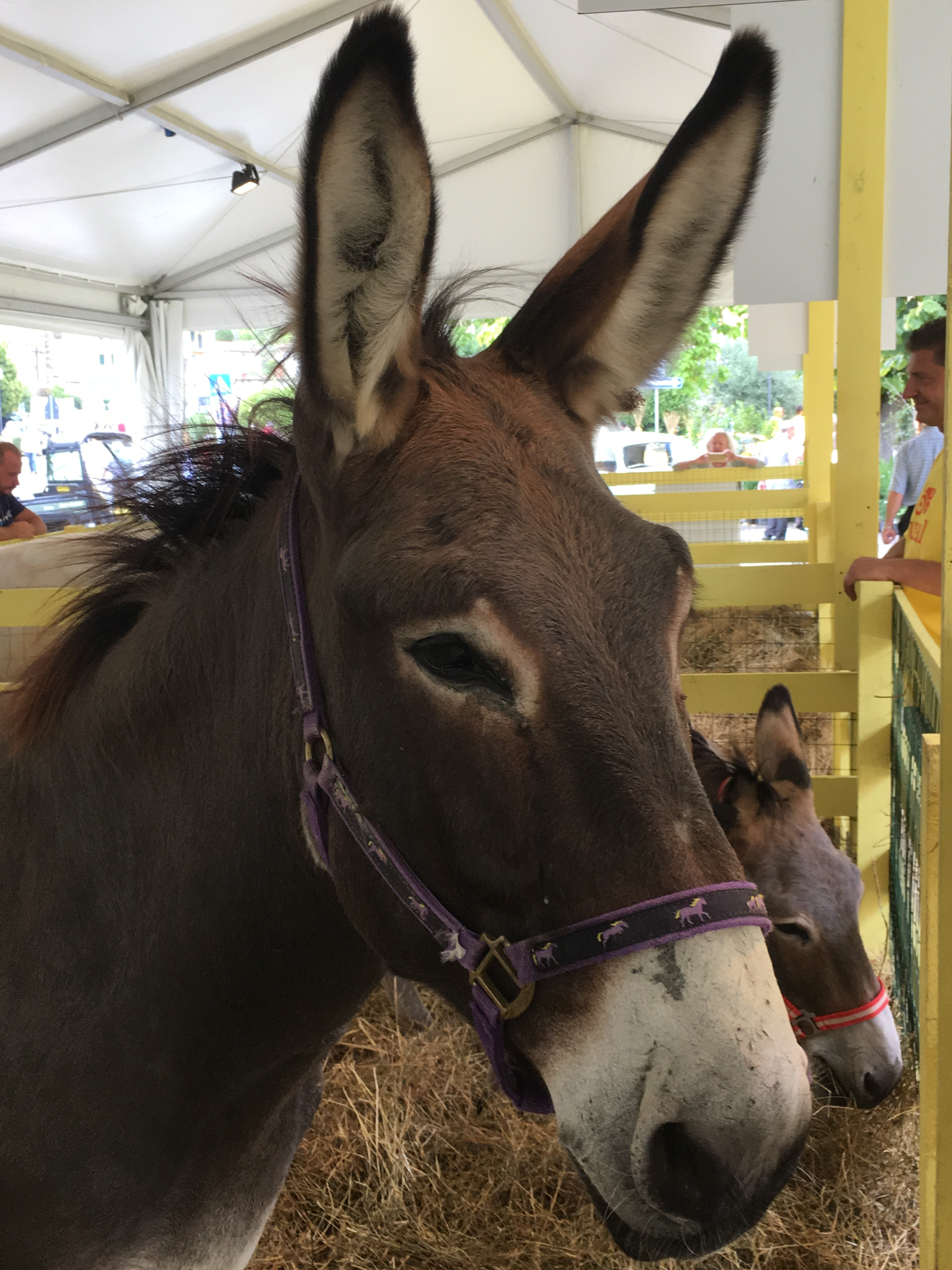
Head view, showing the pale muzzle, insides of the ears and the surrounds of the eyes

The Romagnolo or Asino Romagnolo is an Italian breed of donkey. It originates in, and is named for, the region of Emilia-Romagna in northern Italy. It is raised mainly in the province of Forlì-Cesena, but also in the Metropolitan City of Bologna and in the provinces of Ravenna and Reggio Emilia. It is one of the eight autochthonous donkey breeds of limited distribution recognised by the Ministero dell'Agricoltura, della Sovranità Alimentare e delle Foreste, the Italian ministry of agriculture and forestry. The conservation status of the Romagnolo was listed as "critical" by the Food and Agriculture Organization of the United Nations in 2007. The Asino di Sant'Alberto is considered to form part of the breed.

== History ==
The Romagnolo is a traditional breed of the historic region of Romagna, now the south-eastern part of Emilia-Romagna. In the early twentieth century it was considered one of several regional sub-breeds of the Pugliese, others being the Basilicata, the Calabrese, the Marchigiano and the Martina Franca or Leccese.

The Asino di Sant'Alberto, associated with – and named for – the village of Sant'Alberto in the province of Ravenna, is considered to form part of the Romagnolo population, and the name is regarded as a synonym.

== Characteristics ==
The Romagnolo is a large and powerful donkey, with heights in the range 135–155 cm for jacks and 130–145 cm for jennies; mean height, chest circumference and cannon-bone circumference are 137 cm, 158 cm and 18.4 cm for jacks, and 132 cm, 151 cm and 16.7 cm for jennies.

The predominant coat colour is grey (sorcino, 'mouse-grey'), seen in about 75% of the population. This varies from ash-grey to lead-grey, with clearly-marked black dorsal and ventral stripes, shoulder-stripe, and zebra-striping on the legs; the belly and insides of the ears are pale, the muzzle is pale and tipped with black, the mane and tail are black. There are three other coat colours: bay, black and chestnut.

== Use ==
The Romagnolo was traditionally used for draught work or as a pack animal, particularly to bring cut firewood down from the mountains. Shepherds used them to carry young lambs when moving their flocks in the bi-annual transhumance between the summer mountain pastures and the valley land where they spent the winter. Until the mid-twentieth century jacks were commonly used to sire mules, a practice which has almost entirely ceased.

The Romagnolo can maintain an unusually rapid and harmonious trot, and was able to pull carts or gigs over long distances at the trot, at speeds of up to 15 km/h. In the twenty-first century it may be used in onotherapy, and jennies are kept to produce milk for paediatric use.
