= Urea carboxylase =

Class of enzymes

urea carboxylase

Identifiers
- EC no.: 6.3.4.6
- CAS no.: 9058-98-4

Databases
- IntEnz: IntEnz view
- BRENDA: BRENDA entry
- ExPASy: NiceZyme view
- KEGG: KEGG entry
- MetaCyc: metabolic pathway
- PRIAM: profile
- PDB structures: RCSB PDB PDBe PDBsum
- Gene Ontology: AmiGO / QuickGO
Search
- PMC: articles
- PubMed: articles
- NCBI: proteins

In enzymology, a urea carboxylase (EC 6.3.4.6) is an enzyme that catalyzes the chemical reaction

ATP + urea + HCO_{3}- $\rightleftharpoons$ ADP + phosphate + urea-1-carboxylate

The 3 substrates of this enzyme are ATP, urea, and HCO3-, whereas its 3 products are ADP, phosphate, and urea-1-carboxylate (allophanate).

This enzyme belongs to the family of ligases, specifically those forming generic carbon-nitrogen bonds. The systematic name of this enzyme class is urea:carbon-dioxide ligase (ADP-forming). This enzyme participates in urea cycle and metabolism of amino groups. It employs one cofactor, biotin.

== See also ==
- Allophanate hydrolase
