= Ragusano donkey =

Italian breed of donkey

Ragusano
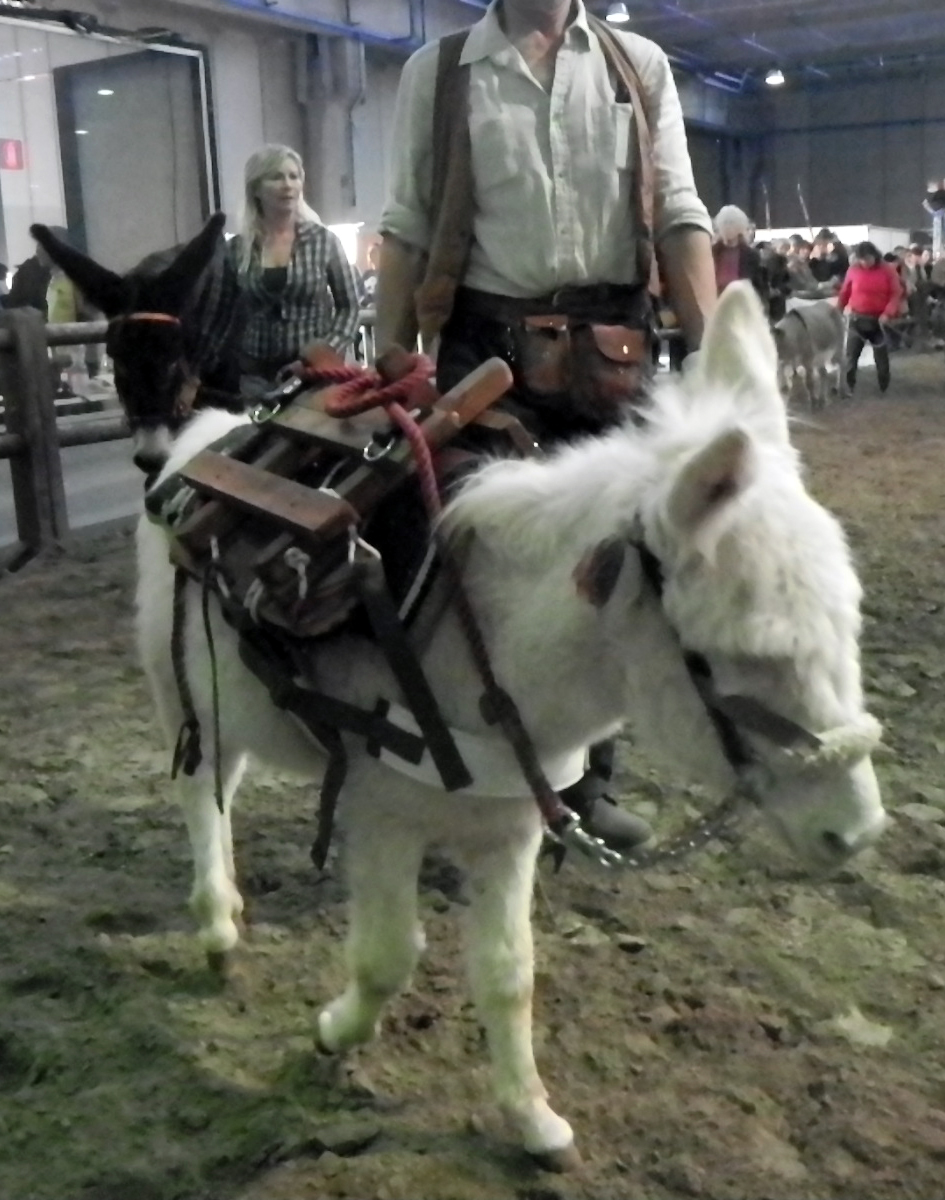
- A large dark-coloured Ragusano behind a much smaller Asinara Donkey at Fieracavalli in Verona
- Conservation status: FAO: endangered
- Country of origin: Italy
- Distribution: Province of Ragusa
- Standard: MIPAAF
- Use: transport; agricultural work; siring mules; milk

Traits
- Height: Male: 138 cm; Female: 130 cm

The Ragusano is an Italian breed of donkey from the Mediterranean island of Sicily. It is associated particularly with the comuni of Modica, Ragusa, Santa Croce Camerina and Scicli, all in the Province of Ragusa in southern Sicily. It is one of the eight autochthonous donkey breeds of limited distribution recognised by the Ministero delle Politiche Agricole Alimentari e Forestali, the Italian ministry of agriculture and forestry. Its conservation status was listed as "endangered" by the Food and Agriculture Organization of the United Nations in 2007.

== History ==
The earliest mentions of the Ragusano date back to the mid-nineteenth century. Although it is distributed mainly in the comuni of Modica, Ragusa, Santa Croce Camerina and Scicli, all in the Province of Ragusa on the southern coast of Sicily, it was developed principally at the Istituto di Incremento Ippico or state horse-breeding centre of Catania, where the herd-book is still kept. It derives mostly from the other two Sicilian donkeys, the Grigio Siciliano and the Pantesco, with some influence from two larger breeds, the Asino di Martina Franca from Puglia and the Catalan of Catalonia. It received official recognition as a breed in 1953.

The conservation status of the Ragusano was listed as "endangered" by the Food and Agriculture Organization of the United Nations in 2007, when the population was reported to be 349. In 2025 it was listed in DAD-IS as "vulnerable", with a total population for 2023 reported at 5013 head in 723 herds, with 3537 registered breeding jennies and 450 breeding jacks.

== Characteristics ==
The Ragusano is larger and more lively than other Sicilian donkeys. Heights at the withers average 138 cm for jacks and 130 cm for jennies; average thoracic circumference (chest-girth) measurements are 150 cm and 140 cm respectively, and the corresponding cannon-bone measurements 18 cm and 17 cm. The coat colour is dark bay, with pale muzzle and eye-surrounds, often also pale on the belly and insides of the legs.

== Uses ==
It is used for transport, for agricultural work, and for trekking, but is particularly useful for siring mules and for the production of asses' milk. The milk has been found to have anti-viral properties which – it has been suggested – might make it a candidate for possible use in the prevention of viral gastro-intestinal infections in humans.
