= Allophanate hydrolase =

Class of enzymes

Identifiers
- EC no.: 3.5.1.54
- CAS no.: 79121-96-3

Databases
- BRENDA: enzyme data
- ExPASy: NiceZyme view
- KEGG: enzyme entry
- MetaCyc: metabolic pathway
- Rhea: reactions
- PDB structures: RCSB PDB PDBe PDBsum
- Gene Ontology: AmiGO / QuickGO
Search
- PMC: articles
- PubMed: articles
- NCBI: proteins

Allophanate hydrolase (EC 3.5.1.54) is an enzyme characterised from Candida utilis and Chlamydomonas reinhardii that hydrolyses allophanic acid into two molecules of ammonia and two of carbon dioxide:

allophanic acid
H_{2}O
2 NH_{3}
2 CO_{2}

The enzyme has also been found in yeast and Oleomonas sagaranensis, where the combination with urea carboxylase allows urea to be converted to ammonia and carbon dioxide in two steps. In bacteria, the enzyme is part of the breakdown pathway for cyanuric acid, which proceeds via biuret and this compound is also hydrolysed, although more slowly than allophanic acid. Biuret is a minor component in commercial urea fertilisers and can inhibit plant growth. Hence it has been suggested that trangenic plants with the bacterial gene would allow them to utilise the fertiliser more efficiently.

This enzyme is a hydrolase, one acting on carbon-nitrogen bonds other than peptide bonds, specifically in linear amides. The systematic name of this enzyme class is urea-1-carboxylate amidohydrolase. This enzyme is also called allophanate lyase.
