= N-(n-Butyl)thiophosphoric triamide =

Names
- Other names Agrotain; N-Butylphosphorothioic triamide

Identifiers
CAS Number	94317-64-3
3D model (JSmol)	Interactive image
ChEMBL	ChEMBL3186430
ChemSpider	84405
ECHA InfoCard	100.103.392
EC Number	435-740-7
PubChem CID	93502
UNII	A6103OK7GF
CompTox Dashboard (EPA)	DTXSID4044747
- InChI: InChI=1S/C4H14N3PS/c1-2-3-4-7-8(5,6)9/h2-4H2,1H3,(H5,5,6,7,9) Key: HEPPIYNOUFWEPP-UHFFFAOYSA-N
- SMILES: CCCCNP(=S)(N)N

Properties
Chemical formula	C_{4}H_{14}N_{3}PS
Molar mass	167.21 g·mol^{−1}
Appearance	white solid
Melting point	54 °C (129 °F; 327 K)

Hazards
- GHS labelling
Pictograms	(GHS05: Corrosive) (GHS08: Health hazard)
Signal word	Danger
Hazard statements	H318, H361
Precautionary statements	P201, P202, P280, P281, P305+P351+P338, P308+P313, P310, P405, P501
- Except where otherwise noted, data are given for materials in their standard state (at 25 °C [77 °F], 100 kPa). Infobox references

N-(n-Butyl)thiophosphoric triamide (NBPT) is the organophosphorus compound with the formula SP(NH_{2})_{2}(NHC_{4}H_{9}). It is an amide of thiophosphoric acid. A white solid, NBPT is an "enhanced efficiency fertilizer", intended to limit the release of nitrogen-containing gases following fertilization. Regarding its chemical structure, the molecule features tetrahedral phosphorus bonded to sulfur and three amido groups.

== Use ==
NBPT functions as an inhibitor of the enzyme urease. Urease, pervasive in soil microorganisms, converts urea into ammonia, which is susceptible to volatilization if produced faster than it can be utilized by plants. Approximately 0.5% by weight NBPT is mixed with the urea.

== See also ==
- Phenyl phosphorodiamidate, another urease inhibitor
