= Phosphoramidate =

Class of organophosphorous compounds

The insecticide fosthietan is a phosphoramidate

In organophosphorus chemistry, phosphoramidates (sometimes also called amidophosphates) are a class of phosphorus compounds structurally related to phosphates (or organophosphates) via the substitution of an −O^{−} group for an amine group (−N−). They are derivatives of phosphoramidic acids, which possess the structure O=P(OH)(NR_{2})_{2} or O=P(OH)_{2}(NR_{2}).

A phosphorodiamidate is a phosphate that has two of its hydroxyl (−OH) groups substituted by amine (NR_{2}) groups to give a species with the general formula O=P(OH)(NH_{2})_{2}. The substitution of all three OH groups gives the phosphoric triamides (O=P(NR_{2})_{3}), which are commonly referred to as phosphoramides.

== Synthesis ==
In the Stokes method, phosphoramidates are synthesized from phosphorus oxychloride. The compound reacts with phenol to form a chlorophosphonate ester or diester, depending on stoichiometry. The remaining chlorine substituents then react with an amine compound to give the phosphoramidate.

== Examples ==
Two examples of natural phosphoramidates are phosphocreatine and the phosphoramidate formed when histidine residues in histidine kinases are phosphorylated. An example of a phosphorodiamidate is morpholino which is used in molecular biology.

== See also ==
- Phosphoramidite
