= Frédéric Alphonse Musculus =

French chemist

Frédéric Alphonse Musculus (1829-1888) was a French chemist.

He was born on July 16, 1829, in Soultz-sous-Forêts and died on May 26, 1888, in Strasbourg.

== Career ==
Son of the pharmacist of Soultz-sous-Forêts, he himself became a pharmacist. Still young, he frequented the laboratory of Boussingault in Paris. He studied starch, became interested in the production of beer and invented an alcoholometer based on capillarity. He was chief pharmacist at the Strasbourg hospital and chaired the Society of sciences, agriculture and arts of Lower Alsace. He did research in collaboration with members of the laboratory of Felix Hoppe-Seyler.

He showed in 1876 that the ammoniacal fermentation of urine is due to a "soluble ferment" (enzyme) which can act in the absence of the living organism to which "one" then attributed the causal role. Pasteur, who had identified the living organism in question ("organized ferment") and attributed to it the role of agent of fermentation, was convinced by the experience of Musculus, but insisted on the fact that the "soluble ferment" was a production of the "organized ferment". The discovery of Musculus (the fact that a fermentation is only indirectly caused by a living organism and that it is possible to obtain this fermentation in the absence of this living organism, with the help of non-living substances that it secreted) was, in the particular case of the ammoniacal fermentation of urine, the confirmation of a general conjecture that Moritz Traube in 1858 and Berthelot in 1860 had formulated about all fermentations and that Buchner would demonstrate in 1897 in the case of alcoholic fermentation. The enzyme discovered by Musculus was later called "urease".

Frédéric Musculus is buried in the Saint-Gall cemetery in Strasbourg (Koenigshoffen).

== Publications ==
Without claiming to be exhaustive:

- "Remarques sur la transformation de la matière amylacée en glucose et dextrine", Annales de chimie et de physique, t. 60, 1860, pp. 203–207, online.
- "Nouvelle note sur la transformation de l'amidon en dextrine et glucose", Comptes rendus de l'Académie des sciences, t. 54, 1862, pp. 194–197, online.
- "Des hydrates stanniques", Comptes rendus de l'Académie des sciences, t. 65, 1867, pp. 961–963, online.
- Note sur la transformation du glucose en une matière analogue à la dextrine, Bulletin de la Société chimique de Paris, nouv. Sér., t. 18, 2e semestre 1872, p. 49 et 66–67, online.
- "Sur un papier réactif de l'urée", Comptes rendus de l'Académie des sciences, t. 78, |janvier 1874, pp. 132–134, consultable sur online.
- "Sur l'amidon soluble", Comptes rendus de l'Académie des sciences, t. 78, 1874, pp. 1413–1417, online.
- "Sur le ferment de l'urée", Comptes rendus de l'Académie des sciences, vol. 82, 1876, pp. 333–336, online.
- F. Musculus et D. Gruber, "Sur l'amidon", Bulletin de la Société chimique de Paris, nouv. sér., t. 30, 1878, pp. 54–70, online.

== Bibliography ==
- Pierre Bachoffner, "Frédéric Alphonse Musculus", in Nouveau dictionnaire de biographie alsacienne, vol. 27, p. 2791.
- Antoine Balland, Les pharmaciens militaires français, L. Fournier, Paris, 1913, p. 350-351.
- (German) A. Schneegans, Festgabe für den Deutschen Apotheker-Verein, Strasbourg, 1897, p. 165. (Quoted by H. Schelenz, see below.)
- Édouard Sitzmann, Dictionnaire de biographie des hommes célèbres d’Alsace, t. II, Paris, 1909–1910, réimpr. Paris, 1973. (Quoted by J.-Cl. Streicher, see below.)
- (German) Hermann Schelenz, « Geschichte der Pharmazie », Georg Olms Verlag, 2005, p. 694, partially online.
- Jean-Claude Streicher : Les pionniers de l’or noir du Pechelbronn, chap. VI of the part concerning J. - B. Boussingault, online.
