= Castel Morrone donkey =

Breed of donkey

- Conservation status: possibly extinct
- Other names: Asino di Castel Morrone; Castel Morrone ass
- Country of origin: Italy
- Distribution: Province of Caserta
- Use: transport; burden

The Castel Morrone donkey or Castel Morrone ass (Italian: Asino di Castel Morrone) is an extinct or nearly extinct breed of donkey from the area of Castel Morrone in the province of Caserta in the Italian region of Campania. Muscular and broad-backed, the animal was widely used as a means of transport in the stony hills of the district around Castel Morrone, as well as a beast of burden. It is or was characterised by large ears, a large-ish head, long hooves, and a blackish-grey coat with tawny markings around the eyes.
