= Nitrogen and Non-Protein Nitrogen's effects on Agriculture =

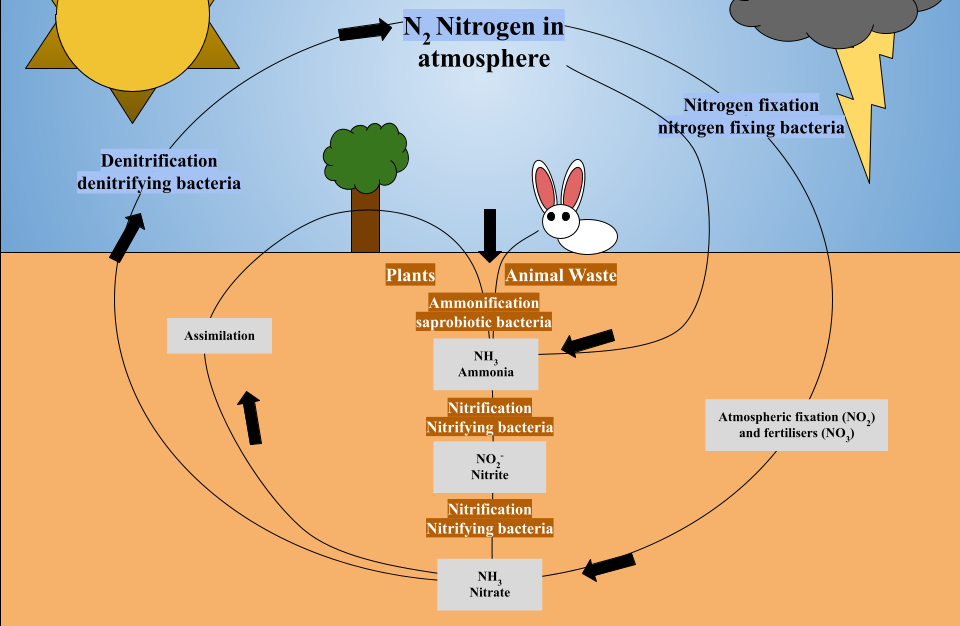
Nitrogen Cycle

Nitrogen's effects on agriculture profoundly influence crop growth, soil fertility, and overall agricultural productivity, while also exerting significant impacts on the environment.

Nitrogen is an element vital to many environmental processes. Nitrogen plays a vital role in the nitrogen cycle, a complex biogeochemical process that involves the transformation of nitrogen between different chemical forms and its movement through various environmental compartments such as the atmosphere, soil, water, and living organisms. In its natural state, nitrogen exists primarily as a gas (N2) in the atmosphere, making up about 78% of the air we breathe. Nitrogen finds extensive usage across various sectors, primarily in the agriculture industry, and transportation. Its versatility stems from its ability to form numerous compounds, each with unique properties and applications.

== Impacts on agriculture ==
Nitrogen is a fundamental nutrient in agriculture, playing a crucial role in plant growth and development. It is an essential component of proteins, enzymes, chlorophyll, and nucleic acids, all of which are essential for various metabolic processes within plants. When discussing the application of nitrogen in agriculture, it is essential to consider the sources of nitrogen used. Synthetic nitrogen fertilizers, such as ammonium nitrate and urea, are commonly applied to crops to replenish soil nitrogen levels and enhance crop productivity These fertilizers provide readily available nitrogen for plant uptake, thereby promoting vigorous vegetative growth and improving yields. However, the excessive or inefficient use of nitrogen fertilizers can lead to environmental problems such as nitrogen leaching, runoff, and emissions of nitrogen oxides (NOx). Nitrogen leaching occurs when nitrogen compounds, primarily nitrates, move through the soil profile and enter groundwater, potentially contaminating drinking water sources. To mitigate these environmental impacts, various nitrogen management strategies are employed in agriculture. Soil testing is an essential practice that helps farmers assess the nutrient status of their soils and determine appropriate fertilizer application rates. Nutrient management plans based on soil test results help optimize fertilizer use efficiency while minimizing nitrogen losses to the environment.

== Effects on water quality ==
Water quality is greatly influenced by nitrogen, which also has an impact on ecosystems in settings that have been modified by humans. Even though nitrogen is a necessary element for life, too much of it in water can have negative effects on aquatic ecosystems and endanger human health. Agricultural runoff, where fertilizers containing nitrogen compounds can seep into rivers, lakes, and groundwater, is one of the main sources of nitrogen in water. Urban areas also release wastewater and add nitrogen through stormwater runoff. The process of eutrophication, in which an abundance of nutrients encourages the growth of algae and other aquatic plants, can be brought on by elevated nitrogen levels in water.

== Non-protein nitrogen ==
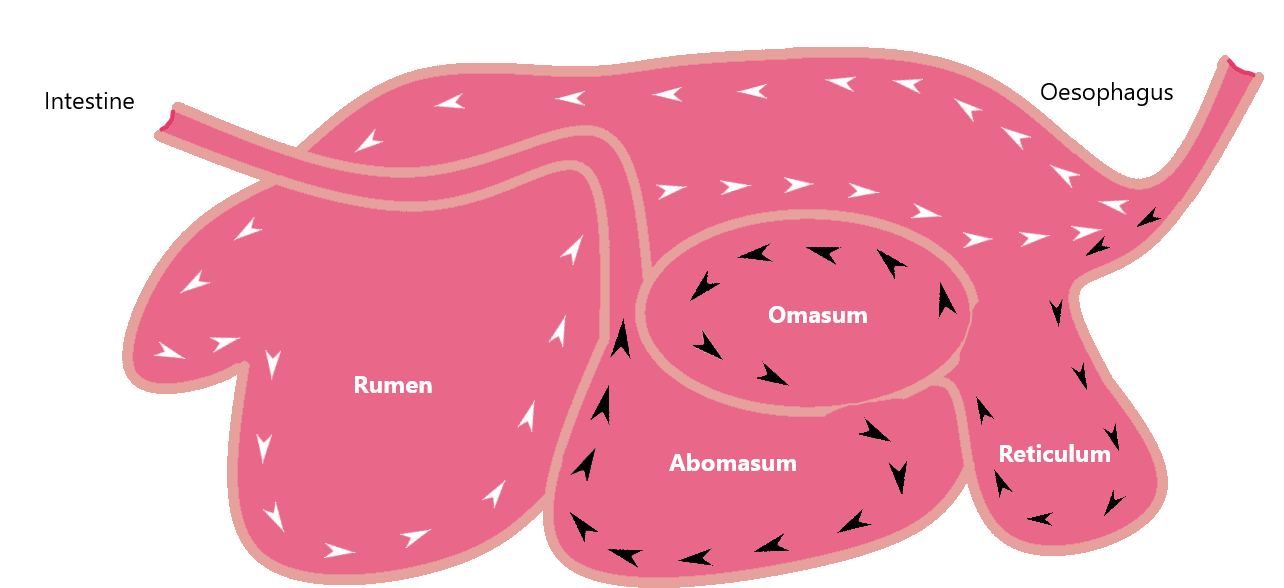
Ruminant Digestive System

Non-protein nitrogen (or NPN) is a term used in animal nutrition to refer collectively to components such as urea, biuret, and ammonia, which are not proteins but can be converted into microbial proteins by microbes in the ruminant stomach, which is then digested and absorbed by the animal as a source of amino acids for the animal, supporting growth and productivity. Due to their lower cost compared to plant and animal proteins, their inclusion in a diet can result in economic gain. NPN can also be used to artificially raise crude protein values, which are measured based on nitrogen content, as protein is about 16% nitrogen and the only major component of most food that contains nitrogen is protein. NPN can only be utilized as protein by ruminants and its addition is useless in non-ruminant feed.

The source of NPN is typically a chemical feed additive, or sometimes chicken waste, and cattle manure.

Excessive intake of NPN can have adverse effects on animal health and productivity, as well as environmental implications. Specifically, excess levels cause a depression in growth and possible ammonia toxicity, as microbes convert NPN to ammonia first before using that to make protein. Excess ammonia can also disrupt rumen pH balance and microbial activity, leading to conditions such as rumen acidosis. Furthermore, excessive excretion of nitrogen in urine and feces from animals consuming diets high in NPN can contribute to nitrogen pollution in the environment. Nitrogen runoff from agricultural operations can lead to eutrophication of water bodies, harmful algal blooms, and degradation of aquatic ecosystems.

== See also ==
- Nitrogen cycle
- Cyanamide
- Cyanuric acid
- Melamine
- 1,3,5-Triazine
- Triazines
- Chinese protein export contamination
