= Phenyl phosphorodiamidate =

Names
- Preferred IUPAC name Phenyl phosphorodiamidate

Identifiers
CAS Number	7450-69-3
3D model (JSmol)	Interactive image
ChEMBL	ChEMBL462480
ChemSpider	73959
ECHA InfoCard	100.028.380
EC Number	231-218-6
PubChem CID	81954
UNII	5F6HV3J4VN
CompTox Dashboard (EPA)	DTXSID4073382
- InChI: InChI=1S/C6H9N2O2P/c7-11(8,9)10-6-4-2-1-3-5-6/h1-5H,(H4,7,8,9) Key: AYRRNFHDJUXLEQ-UHFFFAOYSA-N
- SMILES: C1=CC=C(C=C1)OP(=O)(N)N

Properties
Chemical formula	C_{6}H_{9}N_{2}O_{2}P
Molar mass	172.124 g·mol^{−1}
Appearance	white solid
Melting point	185 °C (365 °F; 458 K)

Hazards
- GHS labelling
Pictograms	(GHS07: Exclamation mark)
Signal word	Warning
Hazard statements	H302, H319
Precautionary statements	P264, P270, P280, P301+P312, P305+P351+P338, P330, P337+P313, P501
- Except where otherwise noted, data are given for materials in their standard state (at 25 °C [77 °F], 100 kPa). Infobox references

Phenyl phosphorodiamidate is an organophosphorus compound with the formula C_{6}H_{5}OP(O)(NH_{2})_{2}. A white solid, it is used as an inhibitor of urease, an enzyme that accelerates the hydrolysis of urea. In this way, phenyl phosphorodiamidate enhances the effectiveness of urea-based fertilizers. It is a component of the technology of controlled release fertilizers.

In terms of its molecular structure, phenyl phosphorodiamidate is a tetrahedral molecule structurally related to urea, hence its inhibitory function. It is a derivative of phosphoryl chloride.

== See also ==
- N-(n-butyl)thiophosphoric triamide, a related urease inhibitor
