= Grigio Siciliano =

Breed of donkey

- Conservation status: FAO: critical
- Other names: Asino Ferrante; Asino Grigio Siciliano
- Country of origin: Italy
- Distribution: in Sicily: Agrigento; Enna; Palermo; Ragusa; Syracuse

Traits
- Height: Female: 124 cm

The Grigio Siciliano or Asino Ferrante, is a breed of donkey from the Mediterranean island of Sicily in southern Italy. It is bred only on the island, in the provinces of Agrigento, Enna, Palermo, Ragusa and Syracuse. The conservation status of the Grigio Siciliano was listed as "critical" by the Food and Agriculture Organization of the United Nations in 2007. In 2012 it was not among the autochthonous donkey breeds of limited distribution recognised by the Ministero delle Politiche Agricole Alimentari e Forestali, the Italian ministry of agriculture and forestry. A recent census conducted by researchers at the University of Messina counted approximately 100 individuals between 4 months and 14 years old.
