= Donkey milk =

Milk produced by female donkeys

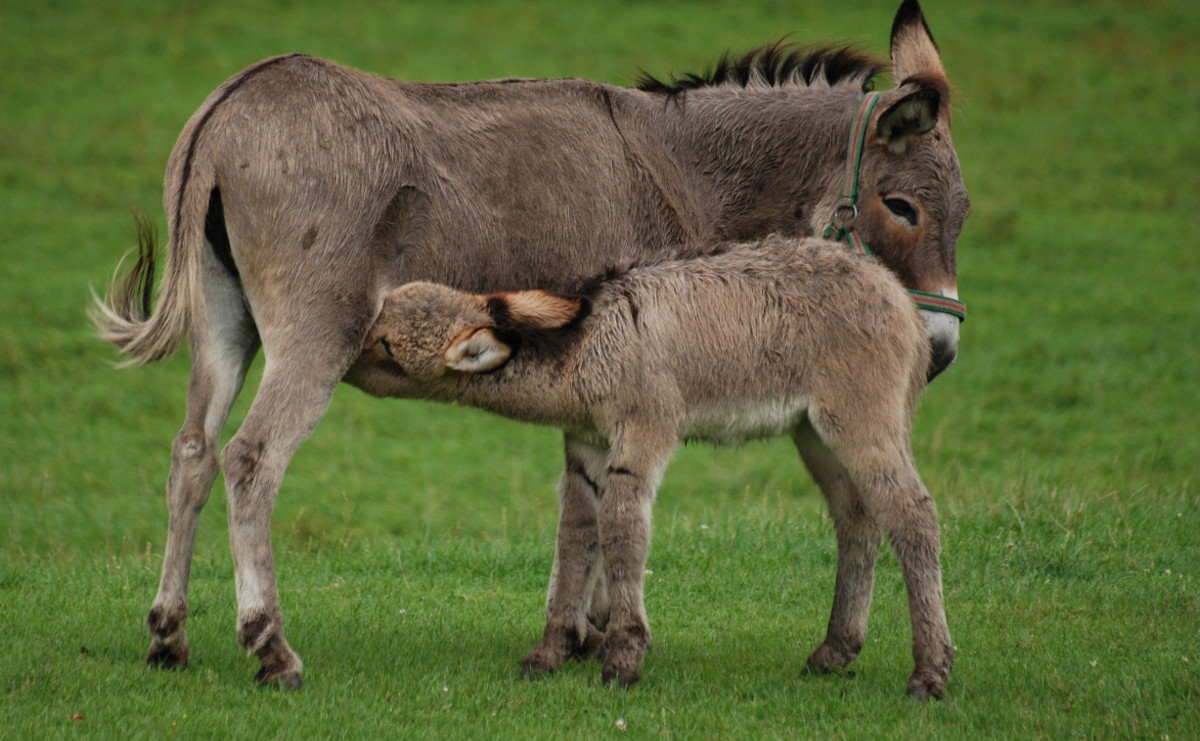
Suckling donkey

Donkey milk (or ass milk, or jenny milk) is the milk from the domesticated donkey (Equus asinus). It has been used since antiquity for cosmetic purposes as well as infant nutrition.

== History ==
Donkey milk has been used by humans for alimentary and cosmetic purposes since Egyptian antiquity. Doctors recommended it to treat several afflictions because of its supposed healing and cosmetic virtues.

Hippocrates (460–370 BC) was the first to write of the medicinal use of donkey milk and prescribed it for numerous conditions, including poisoning, fevers, infectious diseases, edema, wounds, nose bleeds, and liver trouble. In the Roman era, donkey milk was a recognized remedy; Pliny the Elder (23–79 AD) in his encyclopedic work, Naturalis Historia, wrote extensively about its health benefits, i.e. to fight fever, fatigue, eye strain, weakened teeth, face wrinkles, poisonings, ulcerations, asthma, and certain gynecological troubles.

However, it was not until the Renaissance that the first real scientific consideration was given to donkey milk. Georges-Louis Leclerc the Comte de Buffon (1707–1788) mentions the benefits of donkey milk in his Histoire naturelle and Pauline Bonaparte (1780–1825), Napoleon's sister, is reported to have used donkey milk for skin care.

In France in the nineteenth century, Dr. Parrot of the Hospital des Enfants Assistés spread the practice of bringing motherless babies directly to the donkey's nipple (Bulletin de l’Académie de médicine, 1882). Donkey's milk was sold until the twentieth century to feed orphaned infants and to cure delicate children, the sick, and the elderly. For this reason, there were many donkey farms in Italy, Belgium, Germany, and Switzerland.

In the twenty-first century, donkey milk is largely used in the manufacture of soaps and moisturizers, but evidence shows it has possible medical uses to treat infants and children with cow's milk protein allergy (CMPA) as a natural "formula" for infants.

== Production ==
The donkey is considered a seasonal polyestrous animal. However, the latitudinal location of the farm can greatly impact the reproduction cycle. The female is normally pregnant for about 12 months.

Donkey milk production differs greatly from that of conventional dairy species, especially in terms of milk supply, which is much more limited. The equid mammary gland has a low capacity (max 2.5 L) and a part of the milk production should be left to the foal. Milking may be carried out two or three hours after separation from the foal. Donkeys should be milked three times a day from 20 to 90 days after foaling. A female produces between 0.5 and 1.3 litres of milk a day for about 6–7 months. The variability of donkey milk production is due to many factors, such as individual milkability, nutrition, genetics and management of reproduction, in addition to milking management.

Generally, a donkey farm for milk production is small, and has rarely more than ten heads or so. The largest donkey farm in Europe is found in northern Italy. The Montebaducco donkey farm in Quattro Castella, a comune in Emilia Romagna, Italy, has 800 donkey heads.

== Composition ==
=== Gross composition ===
Published data on donkey milk's gross composition confirm the close resemblance to breast milk for lactose, protein, and ash levels when compared with cow, sheep and goat milk. Despite the high lactose content of donkey milk, the average fat content is lower. When used in infant nutrition, donkey milk is usually supplemented with vegetable oil (4 mL per 100 mL of milk) to conform to human milk energy.

Composition of donkey's, mare's, human and cow's milk (g/100 g)
Composition	Donkey	Mare	Human	Cow
pH	7.0–7.2	7.18	7.0–7.5	6.6–6.8
Protein g/100g	1.5–1.8	1.5–2.8	0.9–1.7	3.1–3.8
Fat g/100g	0.3–1.8	0.5–2.0	3.5–4.0	3.5–3.9
Lactose g/100g	5.8–7.4	5.8–7.0	6.3–7.0	4.4–4.9
Total Solids (TS) g/100 g	8.8–11.7	9.3–11.6	11.7–12.9	12.5–13.0
Casein Nitrogen (CN) g/100 g	0.64–1.03	0.94–1.2	0.32–0.42	2.46–2.80
Whey protein g/100 g	0.49–0.80	0.74–0.91	0.68–0.83	0.55–0.70
NPN g/100 g	0.18–0.41	0.17–0.35	0.26–0.32	0.1–0.19
Casein Nitrogen (CN) %	47.28	50	26.06	77.23
Whey protein %	36.96	38.79	53.52	17.54
NPN %	15.76	11.21	20.42	5.23

The casein to whey protein ratio in donkey milk was lower compared to the value in cow milk.

Non-protein nitrogen (NPN) accounts for an average of 16% of total nitrogen in donkey milk, which is close to values reported for human milk (20%) but higher than those of domestic ruminants (5%).

The amino acid profile of the donkey milk proteins shows a very similar percentage of essential amino acids (36.7 to 38.2 g amino acid /100 g protein) than in human milk proteins (40.7 g amino acid /100 g protein).

=== Functional and bioactive components ===
Among the functional proteins detected in donkey milk, there are molecules active in antimicrobial protection such as lysozyme and lactoferrin. The lactoferrin content of donkey milk is intermediate between the lower values of cow milk and the higher values of human milk. Lactoferrin inhibits the growth of iron-dependent bacteria in the gastrointestinal tract. This inhibits certain organisms, such as coliforms and yeast, that require iron. Lysozyme in donkey milk is present in large amounts, and ranges from 1.0 mg/mL to 4 mg/mL, depending on the analytical method used (chemical or microbiological); This substance is present also in humans (0.12 mg/mL) but only in trace amounts in cow and goat milk. Lysozyme in donkey milk is highly thermo-stable and is very resistant to acid and protease and may play a significant role in the intestinal immune response.

In donkey mammary secretion, defatted or not, growth factors and hormones have also been determined. Donkey mammary secretions contain human-like leptin at levels close to human milk (3.35 e 5.32 ng/mL milk). The bioactive peptides insulin-like growth factor 1, ghrelin, and triiodothyronine were also found in frozen donkey milk. These molecules and many others present in human milk, are increasingly receiving attention from a nutraceutical point of view because of their potential direct role in regulating food intake, metabolism, and infant body condition.

== Nutritional use ==
=== Natural hypoallergenic milk for infants with cows' milk protein allergy ===
Pasteurized donkey milk is used as a natural hypoallergenic milk because it is tolerated by about 90% of infants with food allergies, e.g., cows' milk protein allergy (CMPA), a common food allergy in childhood with a prevalence of approximately 3% during the first 3 years of life. However, an infant's tolerance to donkey milk must be evaluated under medical supervision, and after carrying out specific allergy tests. Natural hypoallergenic formula is preferred over those of soy or produced from protein hydrolysates because it has a pleasant taste and may not cause allergies in people who also have allergic reactions to soy proteins or protein hydrolysates.

=== Natural "infant formula" ===
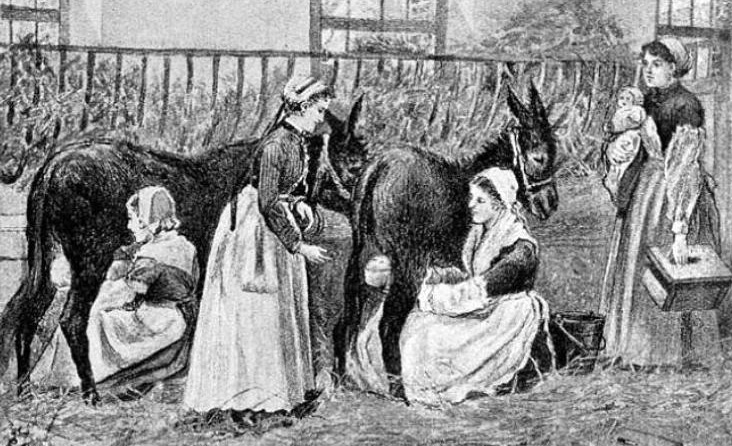
Donkeys suckling children in a French institution, 1895. Direct udder nursing became widespread in Europe once the risk of infected wet nurses was understood.

Donkey's milk is similar to human milk for its lactose, proteins, minerals, and amino-acid content.

In terms of energy, donkey milk has a high lactose content but a low average fat content. To use it in infant nutrition before weaning, donkey milk should be fortified with a source of fat (sunflower oil); particular attention must also be given to essential fatty acids. Omega‐3 and omega‐6 fatty acids, particularly docosahexaenoic acid (DHA), are known to play an essential role in the development of the brain and retina. Intakes in pregnancy and early life affect growth and cognitive performance later in childhood, ensuring adequate intakes of fat, essential fatty acids, and DHA through these life stages is crucial. Cost-effective dietary sources of these fatty acids are needed to ensure adequate essential fatty acid and DHA intakes in these populations. The integration of these substances can take place with supplements of essential fatty acids (omega-3; omega-6) and vegetable oil certified for babies. It is important to exclude spores that can pass the gastric mucosa in the first 4 months. For children who are not allergic to cow or goat milk, a part of the fat can be compensated naturally by adding 1–2% of cow or goat butter. In any case, the integration of fats and essential fats can be done through the integration of donkey milk with artificial formulas for infants.

From the point of view of hygienic-sanitary safety, like all milk, donkey milk and its ingredients must be pasteurized before taking. The process of pasteurizing donkey milk deactivates bacterial and viral contaminants.

Donkey milk contains immune-enhancing compounds (in particular lysozyme and lactoferrin) to help protect infants from disease. In addition, the flavour and appearance of donkey milk are attractive to children.

=== Diet supplement ===
Donkey's milk is recommended for countering stomach acid, promoting the growth of intestinal flora, calming coughs and pertussis (a.k.a. whooping cough), and for use in the treatment of immune-mediated disorders.

== Commercial forms ==
=== Raw donkey milk ===
After collection, donkey milk is cooled to refrigeration temperature.

Raw milk can be kept for 3 days at refrigerator temperature starting from the day of milking. To prolong conservation, raw milk can be frozen for up to 2–3 months. In any case, it must be thawed in the refrigerator and pasteurized before use.

EU regulations dictate that it must be pasteurized before being used, i.e. it must be heated up to about 90 °C for at least 2 minutes.

=== Pasteurized donkey milk ===
Donkey milk is pasteurized in a closed circuit of pasteurization and bottling (aseptic) at least 72 °C for 15 seconds or equivalent times and temperatures. In the case of pasteurization in discontinuous systems, the temperature must be higher depending on the method used and the type of plant and destination.

=== Freeze drying (lyophilized) ===
Donkey milk can be freeze-dried to preserve the biological quality of the milk, and so preserve its nutritional, functional, and cosmetic properties. This is possible because in freeze drying the milk is frozen and brought under vacuum at low temperatures. During this process, the water is removed by sublimation. The result is approximately ten percent of dry matter that is called lyophilized (or freeze-dried) donkey milk. This powder is easy to reconstitute. The lyophilized product has to be packaged without any oxygen. It has a shelf life of two years. Normally it is produced from pasteurized donkey milk so it is ready to use.

Analysis of freeze-dried donkey's milk has demonstrated that the natural colour, flavours, nutrients, and bioactive substances of fresh donkey milk are retained. Spray-drying is another way to dry products, in which the milk is heated and vitamins and other important bioactive substances may get lost. In contrast, Freeze-drying does not require chemical preservatives and can be either consumed directly or re-hydrated easily. However, this method for is costly, and is practiced only by a few companies.

This product is easy to find in Italy, where it was for the first time put on the market.

== Cosmetic use ==
=== Cosmetics with donkey milk ===
In recent years, the cosmetic industry has focused on products made with natural ingredients, and is oriented towards sustainable consumption. Because of their natural origin, milk components correspond in many fields to the needs of the cosmetics industry.

A recent scientific study on a cream containing lyophilized donkey milk showed different benefits for the skin. These results are related to the effectiveness of donkey milk components like proteins, minerals, vitamins, essential fatty acids, bioactive enzymes, and coenzymes which provide balanced nourishment and proper hydration for the skin. In particular vitamin C content in donkey milk is almost 4 times more of cow's milk. Since donkey milk contains more lactoferrin than cows milk, and a considerable amount of lysozyme, it has the potential, when properly formulated, to reduce skin problems such as eczema, acne, psoriasis, and herpes by calming the irritation symptoms as reported by some authors.

Some authors have preliminarily evaluated whether the use of a face cream made from donkey milk affected the perception of some sensory aspects. The results showed that treated cream was appreciated by dry skin consumers for the following sensory aspects: spreadability, total appearance, smoothness, moisturisation, and total effectiveness. The overall judgement also resulted highest for face cream made with donkey milk.

Donkey milk is used in the manufacture of soaps and creams.

=== History ===
It is said that Cleopatra, Queen of Ancient Egypt, took baths in donkey milk to preserve the beauty and youth of her skin. Legend has it that no less than 700 donkeys were needed to provide the quantity of milk necessary for her daily bath.

This was also the case for Poppaea Sabina (30–65), second wife of Roman Emperor Nero, who is referred to in Pliny's description of the virtues of ass milk for the skin:

"It is generally believed that ass milk effaces wrinkles in the face, renders the skin more delicate, and preserves its whiteness: and it is a well-known fact, that some women are in the habit of washing their face with it seven times daily, strictly observing that number. Poppaea, the wife of Emperor Nero, was the first to practice this; indeed, she had sitting baths, prepared solely with ass milk, for which purpose whole troops of she-asses used to attend her on her journeys."

In his poem Medicamina Faciei Femineae, Roman poet Ovid (43 BC–18 AD) suggests beauty masks made with donkey milk.

Pauline Bonaparte (1780–1825), Napoleon's sister, is reported to have used ass milk for her skin care.

=== Traditional medicine ===
Much of the "medicinal" use of equid milk (donkey and mare) is based on tradition. Scientific studies on equid milk are often lacking regarding the beneficial effects for certain pathologies. Popular medicine or traditional medicine is defined as one that follows traditions or practices before the advent of industrial medicine. Many of these practices have become rooted in popular knowledge and tradition. The first written documents reporting the nutritional and "curative" effects of equine milk date back to around 2000 years ago.

Herodotus in the 5th century BC mentions it as a nutritious drink. Hippocrates (460–370 BC), the father of medicine, described the medicinal virtues of donkey milk. He prescribed donkey milk for numerous ailments, such as liver problems, edemas, nosebleeds, poisonings, infectious diseases, the healing of sores, and fevers. In Roman times, donkey milk was used as a universal remedy. Pliny the Elder (23–79 AD), in his encyclopedic work Naturalis Historia, described its many health benefits, ranging from its use as an anti-venom or as a relief for external irritations (itching) to the use of it in a pomade (ointment) for the eyes. He states that donkey milk is the most effective as a medicine, followed by cow's milk, and then goat's milk. During the Renaissance, donkey milk was the subject of the first real scientific consideration when Francis I, king of France, on the advice of his doctors, used donkey milk to recover from a long illness. There are many testimonials on the effectiveness of donkey milk. The French naturalist Georges-Louis Leclerc (1707–1788) underlined the benefits of donkey milk in his Histoire Naturelle.

Some effects have been supported by systematic and scientific studies starting from the mid-1800s, especially by Russian doctors.

Donkey and mare's milk are very similar, and it is assumed they have similar properties.

The beneficial effects of equid milk, from the first historical sources to the present day, are aimed at:

- Lungs and the entire respiratory system
- The entire digestive system including the liver
- Metabolism
- Skin, directly and indirectly through the intestine
- Hematopoietic organs

It was generally described as a food capable of regenerating a weakened, emaciated, impoverished organism in an unusually short time, allowing the body to achieve better resistance. It was used by the Asian (Mongolian) equestrian peoples often as the only source of food for long periods and during high physical exertion, without the body developing symptoms of deficiency. Under Genghis-chan, the Mongols established a large empire. They moved on their horses across the steppes, deserts, and mountains and covered large distances, and for long periods they lived mainly on the milk of their mares, both fresh and fermented (kumyss). Around 1850, various Russian doctors observed the habits of the shepherds of the Baskirian steppe. They reported that the Basic and Tatars spent the winter in very unfavorable environmental conditions, with temperatures down to minus 60 °C, severe winter storms, and very little or no food. Weakened nomads regained their strength unusually quickly as soon as they fed on mare's milk. Russian doctors observed in the 19th century that tuberculosis was practically non-existent among the steppe nomads. Doctors attributed it to fermented mare milk as the staple food of the steppe people. When this became known in Russia, a migration of tuberculosis patients from Russia to the steppes began. The treatment was initially "wild", without medical supervision. From 1850 the first sanatoriums were founded and treatments were oriented along systematic, medical-scientific lines, however, the importance of kumyss treatment of tuberculosis in Russia lasted until about 1970, then it was gradually replaced by modern medicine. However, Kumys' treatment was the most effective tuberculosis therapy for many years. Treatment with kumyss & mare's milk has been extended to many other diseases in Russia and Kazakhstan over the decades. Language barriers and cultural differences still prevent exchange between the Western cultural area and these cultures today, however, Russia and Kazakhstan are still conducting scientific research on the effects of equine milk and kumyss on humans.

Postnikov, a Russian doctor who dedicated his career to the research and use of horse milk in the mid-19th century, summed up its effects in three words:

- Nourishes: gives the body the ability to better absorb and use food.
- Strengthens: strengthens and stimulates the functional activity of the organs.
- Modification: changes and renew the metabolism functions in the body towards healthy and normal.
