= Biuret =

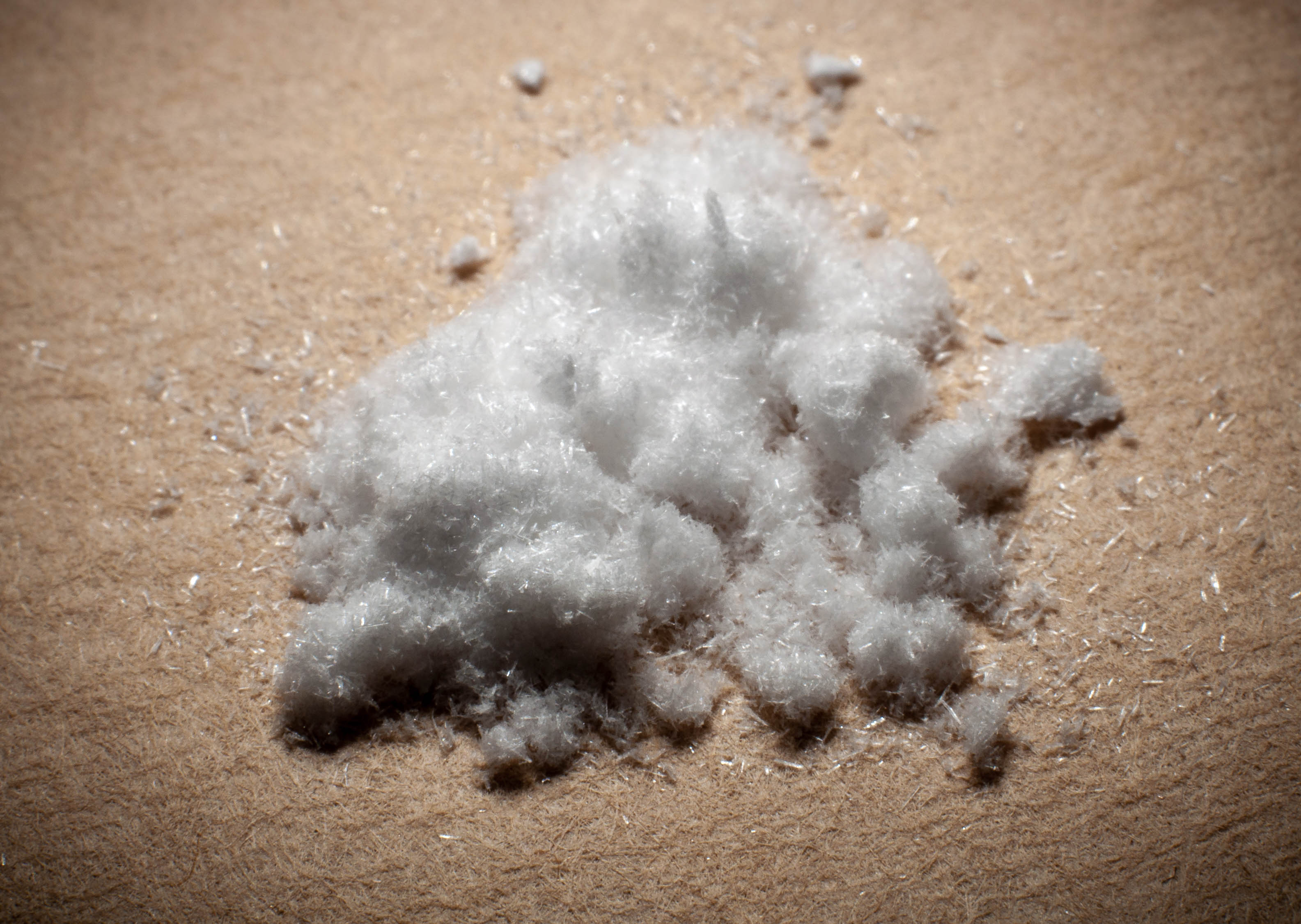

Names
- Preferred IUPAC name 2-Imidodicarbonic diamide
- Other names: Biuret; Allophanamide; Carbamylurea; Allophanic acid amide; Allophanimidic acid; N-carbamoylaminomethanamide; Ureidoformamide; Imidodicarbonic diamide; Diurea

Identifiers
CAS Number	108-19-0
3D model (JSmol)	Interactive image
Beilstein Reference	1703510
ChEBI	CHEBI:18138
ChemSpider	7625
ECHA InfoCard	100.003.236
EC Number	203-559-0
Gmelin Reference	49702
KEGG	C06555
MeSH	Biuret
PubChem CID	7913
UNII	89LJ369D1H
CompTox Dashboard (EPA)	DTXSID2026783
- InChI: InChI=1S/C2H5N3O2/c3-1(6)5-2(4)7/h(H5,3,4,5,6,7) Key: OHJMTUPIZMNBFR-UHFFFAOYSA-N
- SMILES: NC(=O)NC(N)=O

Properties
Chemical formula	HN(CONH_{2})_{2}
Molar mass	103.081 g·mol^{−1}
Appearance	White crystals
Odor	Odourless
Density	1.467 g/cm^{3}
Melting point	190 °C (decomposes)

Thermochemistry
Heat capacity (C)	131.3 J/(mol·K)
Std molar entropy (S^{⦵}_{298})	146.1 J/(mol·K)
Std enthalpy of formation (Δ_{f}H^{⦵}_{298})	(−565.8) – (−561.6) kJ/mol
Std enthalpy of combustion (Δ_{c}H^{⦵}_{298})	(−940.1) – (−935.9) kJ/mol

Hazards
- GHS labelling
Pictograms	(GHS07: Exclamation mark)
Signal word	Warning
Hazard statements	H315, H319, H335
Precautionary statements	P261, P305+P351+P338

Related compounds
Related compounds	urea; triuret; cyanuric acid
- Except where otherwise noted, data are given for materials in their standard state (at 25 °C [77 °F], 100 kPa). verify (what is ?) Infobox references

Biuret (/ˈbjurɛt/ BYUR-ret) is a chemical compound with the chemical formula HN(CONH_{2})_{2}. It is a white solid that is soluble in hot water. A variety of organic derivatives are known. The term "biuret" also describes a family of organic compounds with the chemical formula R^{1}R^{2}N−C(=O)−N(R^{3})−C(=O)−NR^{4}R^{5}, where R^{1}, R^{2}, R^{3}, R^{4} and R^{5} are hydrogen, organyl or other groups. Also known as carbamylurea, it results from the condensation of two equivalents of urea. It is a common undesirable impurity in urea-based fertilizers, as biuret is toxic to plants.

== Preparation and structure ==
The parent compound can be prepared by heating urea at 150 °C for ~6 hours until it gets slightly cloudy, then recrystallizing from water. After that, it can be recrystallized repeatedly from 2% sodium hydroxide solution and water to finally get base-free crystalline needles of the monohydrate which are free of cyanuric acid. While heating, a lot of ammonia is expelled:

2 CO(NH_{2})_{2} → HN(CONH_{2})_{2} + NH_{3}

Under related conditions, pyrolysis of urea affords triuret O=C(−N(H)−C(=O)−NH_{2})_{2}. In general, organic biurets (those with alkyl or aryl groups in place of one or more H atoms) are prepared by trimerization of isocyanates. For example, the trimer of 1,6-hexamethylene diisocyanate is also known as HDI-biuret.

In the anhydrous form, the molecule is planar and unsymmetrical in the solid state owing to intramolecular hydrogen bonding. The terminal C–N distances of 1.327 and 1.334 Å are shorter than the internal C–N distances of 1.379 and 1.391 Å. The C=O bond distances 1.247 and 1.237 Å. It crystallizes from water as the monohydrate.

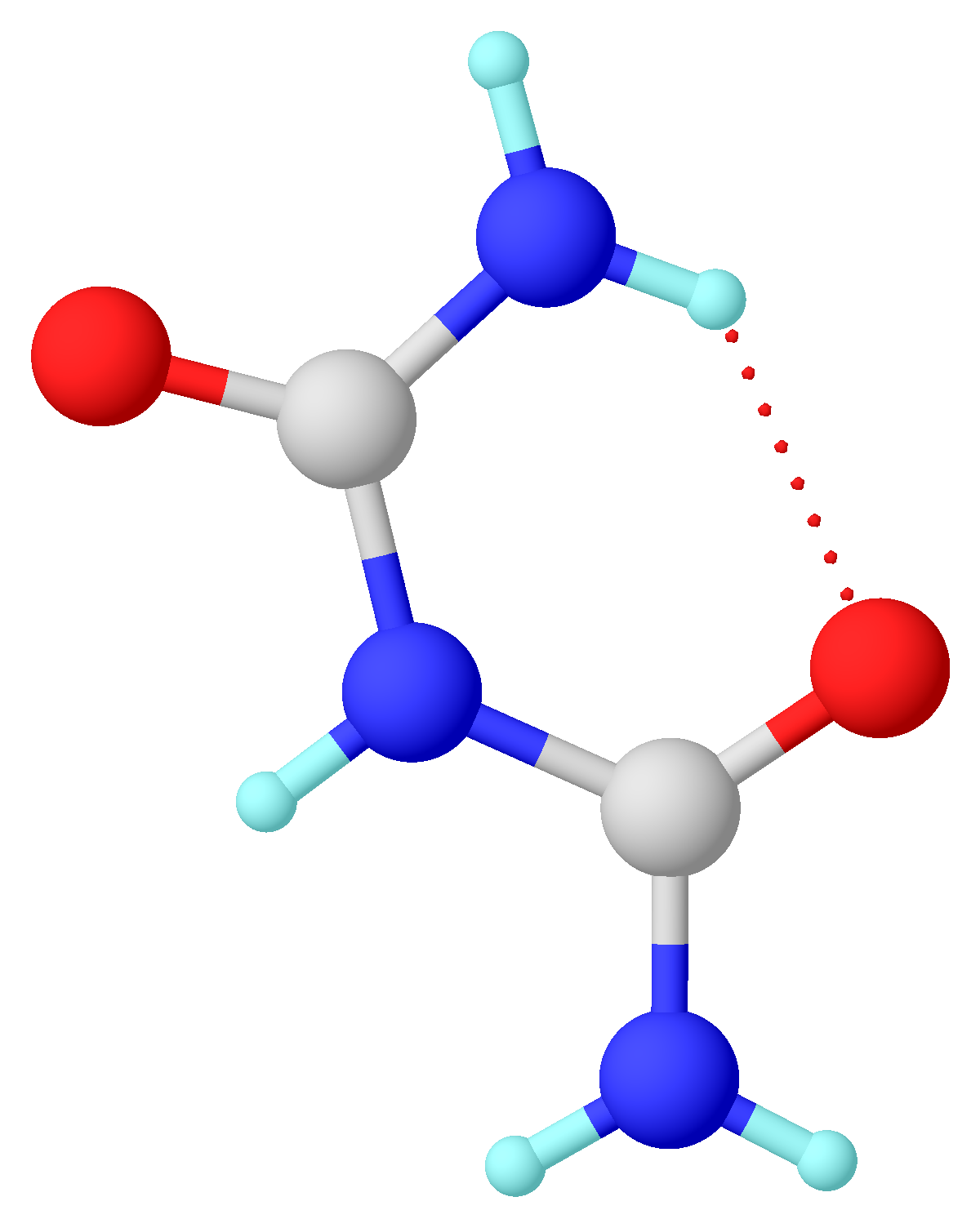
Structure of biuret in the solid state (blue = N, red = O, gray = C, cyan = H).

== Use as feed ==
Biuret is used as a non-protein nitrogen source in ruminant feed, where it is converted into protein by gut microorganisms. It is less favored than urea, due to its higher cost and lower digestibility but the latter characteristic also slows down its digestion and so decreases the risk of ammonia toxicity.

== Biuret test ==
The biuret test is a chemical test for proteins and polypeptides. It is based on the biuret reagent, a blue solution that turns violet upon contact with proteins, or any substance with peptide bonds. The test and reagent do not actually contain biuret; they are so named because both biuret and proteins have the same response to the test.

== History ==
Biuret was first prepared and studied by Gustav Heinrich Wiedemann (1826–1899) for his doctoral dissertation, which was submitted in 1847. His findings were reported in several articles.

== Related compounds ==
- Cyanuric acid
- Allophanic acid, the carboxylic acid derivative of biuret
