= Allophanic acid =

Names
- Preferred IUPAC name Carbamoylcarbamic acid

Identifiers
CAS Number	625-78-5
3D model (JSmol)	Interactive image
Beilstein Reference	1756623
ChEBI	CHEBI:9889
ChemSpider	132943
KEGG	C01010
PubChem CID	150833
UNII	0W5I7B2C2H
CompTox Dashboard (EPA)	DTXSID20211550
- InChI: InChI=1S/C2H4N2O3/c3-1(5)4-2(6)7/h(H,6,7)(H3,3,4,5) Key: AVWRKZWQTYIKIY-UHFFFAOYSA-N
- SMILES: C(=O)(N)NC(=O)O

Properties
Chemical formula	C_{2}H_{4}N_{2}O_{3}
Molar mass	104.065 g·mol^{−1}
- Except where otherwise noted, data are given for materials in their standard state (at 25 °C [77 °F], 100 kPa). Infobox references

Allophanic acid is the organic compound with the formula H_{2}NC(O)NHCO_{2}H. It is a carbamic acid, the carboxylated derivative of urea. Biuret can be viewed as the amide of allophanic acid.

Treating urea with sodium bicarbonate is claimed to give allophanic acid:

H_{2}NC(O)NH_{2} + NaHCO_{3} → H_{2}NC(O)NHCO_{2}H + NaOH

Although allophanic acid per se may not have been purified, its conjugate base, H_{2}NC(O)NHCO_{2}^{−}, allophanate is well known. Salts of this anion have been characterized by X-ray crystallography. The allophanate anion is the substrate for the enzyme allophanate hydrolase.

Allophanate esters arise from the condensation of carbamates.

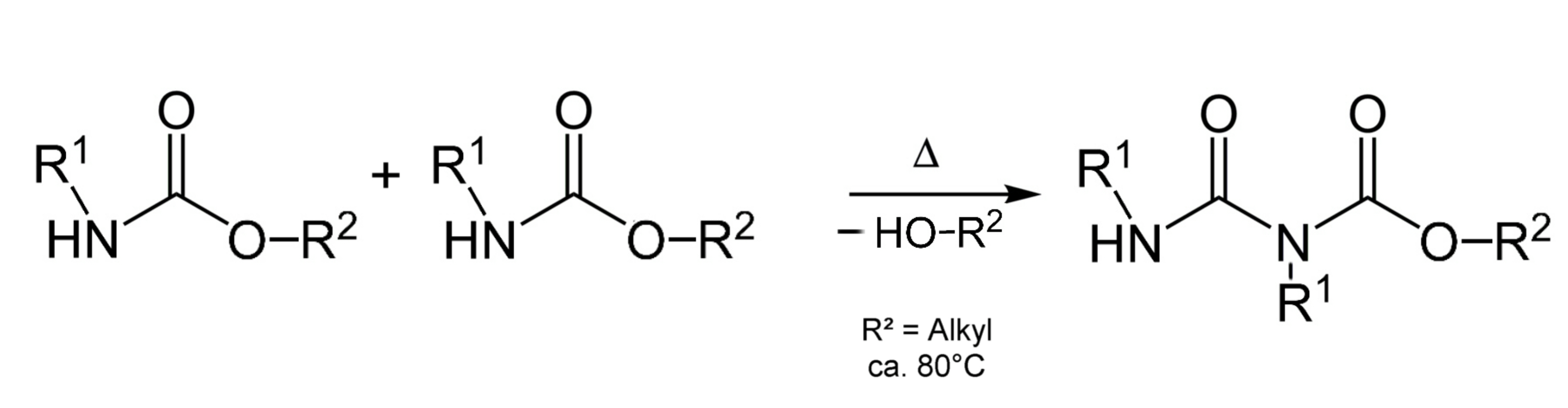
