= Martina Franca donkey =

Breed of donkey

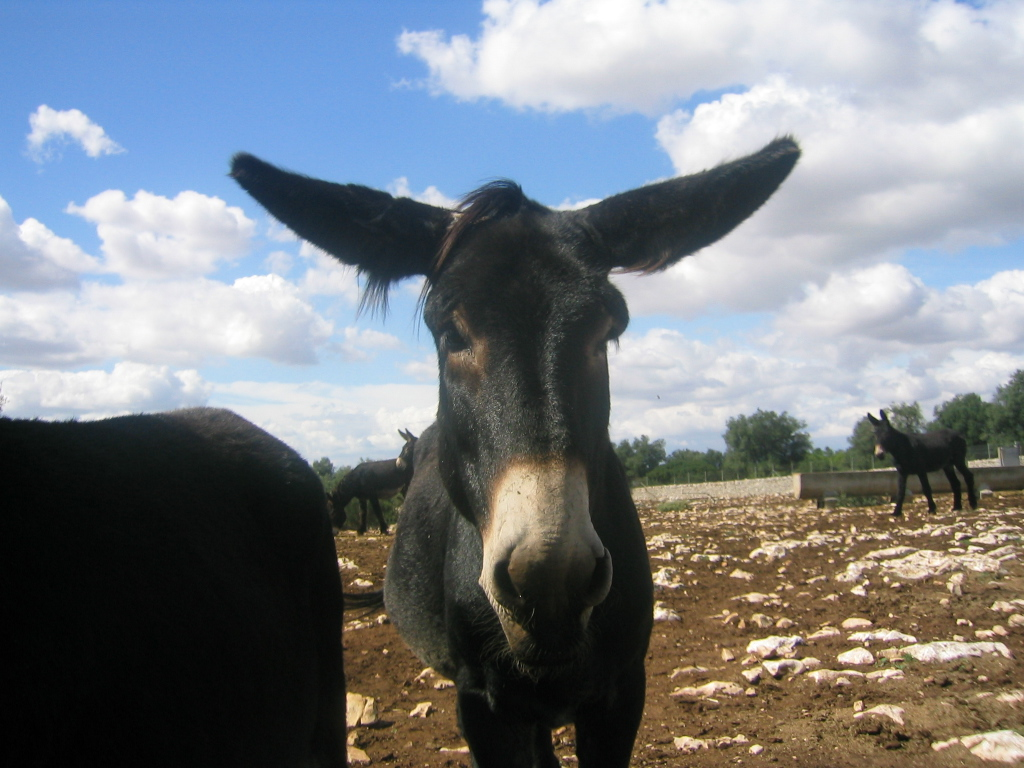
- Conservation status: FAO: endangered
- Other names: Asino di Martina Franca
- Country of origin: Italy
- Distribution: Puglia; Abruzzo; Lazio; Lombardy; Umbria
- Use: siring mules; burden; light draught; meat; milk

Traits
- Height: Male: 135 cm; Female: 127 cm

Classification
- MIPAAF: Breed standard

The Martina Franca, Italian: Asino di Martina Franca, is an Italian breed of donkey from Puglia in southern Italy. It is the largest donkey breed of Italy, and was famous for its qualities in the production of mules. It is particularly associated with the comune of Martina Franca – from which it takes its name – but the area of origin also includes Alberobello, Ceglie Messapica, Locorotondo, Massafra, Mottola and Noci, in the provinces of Bari, Brindisi and Taranto. It is still raised mainly in Puglia, but there are also populations in Abruzzo, Lazio, Lombardy and Umbria. It is one of the eight autochthonous donkey breeds of limited distribution recognised by the Ministero delle Politiche Agricole Alimentari e Forestali, the Italian ministry of agriculture and forestry.

== Use ==
The Martina Franca donkey was in the past used as a beast of burden and as a light draught animal, but its principal use was in the production of mules, particularly when crossed with the Murgese horse to produce the well-known mulo martinese, or "mule of Martina Franca", which was exported throughout Italy and much used in the First World War. In 1925, 70% of Italian mules were produced in Puglia, and from 1926 steps were taken to limit exports outside Italy of the Martina Franca donkey, which was in strong demand and was exported to France, Germany, North America and Yugoslavia.

In the traditional system of management, a donkey colt was separated from the mother and other donkeys at about six months old and placed with a group of mares until the age of about two. It was then kept alone in a trullo, or stone field-shelter, for about a year, and began to cover mares from the age of about three.

A herdbook was established in 1943, and a breeders' association, the Associazione Regionale degli Allevatori dell'Asino di Martina Franca e del Cavallo delle Murge, was formed in 1948. Demand for mules fell rapidly after the Second World War, and both quality and numbers of the Martina Franca donkey dwindled. The tendency was reversed in the 1990s with new demand from new uses, the production of donkey meat and asses' milk. A new breeders' association, the Associazione Nazionale Allevatori del Cavallo Murgese e dell'Asino di Martina Franca, was formed in 1990. In 2008 the total number for the breed was just under 400. The Martina Franca donkey was listed as "endangered" by the Food and Agriculture Organization of the United Nations in 2007.
