= List of Iberian donkey breeds =

This is a list of the breeds of ass or donkey usually considered to originate in Spain and Portugal.

English name if used	Local name	Notes	Image
Andalusian	Andaluza; Asno Andaluz; Asno Cordobés; Asno de Lucena	Spain	
	Asno de las Encartaciones; Enkarterriko asto	Spain	
Balearic	Balear	Spain	
	Burro da Graciosa; Burro Anão da Graciosa; Burro da Ilha Graciosa	Azores, Portugal	
	Burro Fariñeiro; Fariñeiro	Spain	
Miranda	Burro de Miranda	Portugal	
Catalan	Ase Català; Ruc Català; Asno Catalán; Catalána	Catalonia, Spain	
	Majorera	Canary Islands, Spain	
	Zamorano-Leonés	Spain	
