= Burro (disambiguation) =

Burro is a Spanish and Portuguese word for 'donkey', and an Italian word for 'butter'. It may refer to:

- Donkeys including:
  - Feral North American donkeys in the western United States
  - the Burro da Ilha Graciosa of the Azores, Portugal
  - the Burro de Miranda of Portugal
  - the Burro Mexicano or Mexican Burro
- Burro (card game), a card game
- Burro (film), 1989 Italian film
- Burro Island, island of Venezuela
- El Burro wetland in Bogotà
- "Burro," a song by Beck
