= Pyrenean donkey =

French breed of donkey

Pyrenean
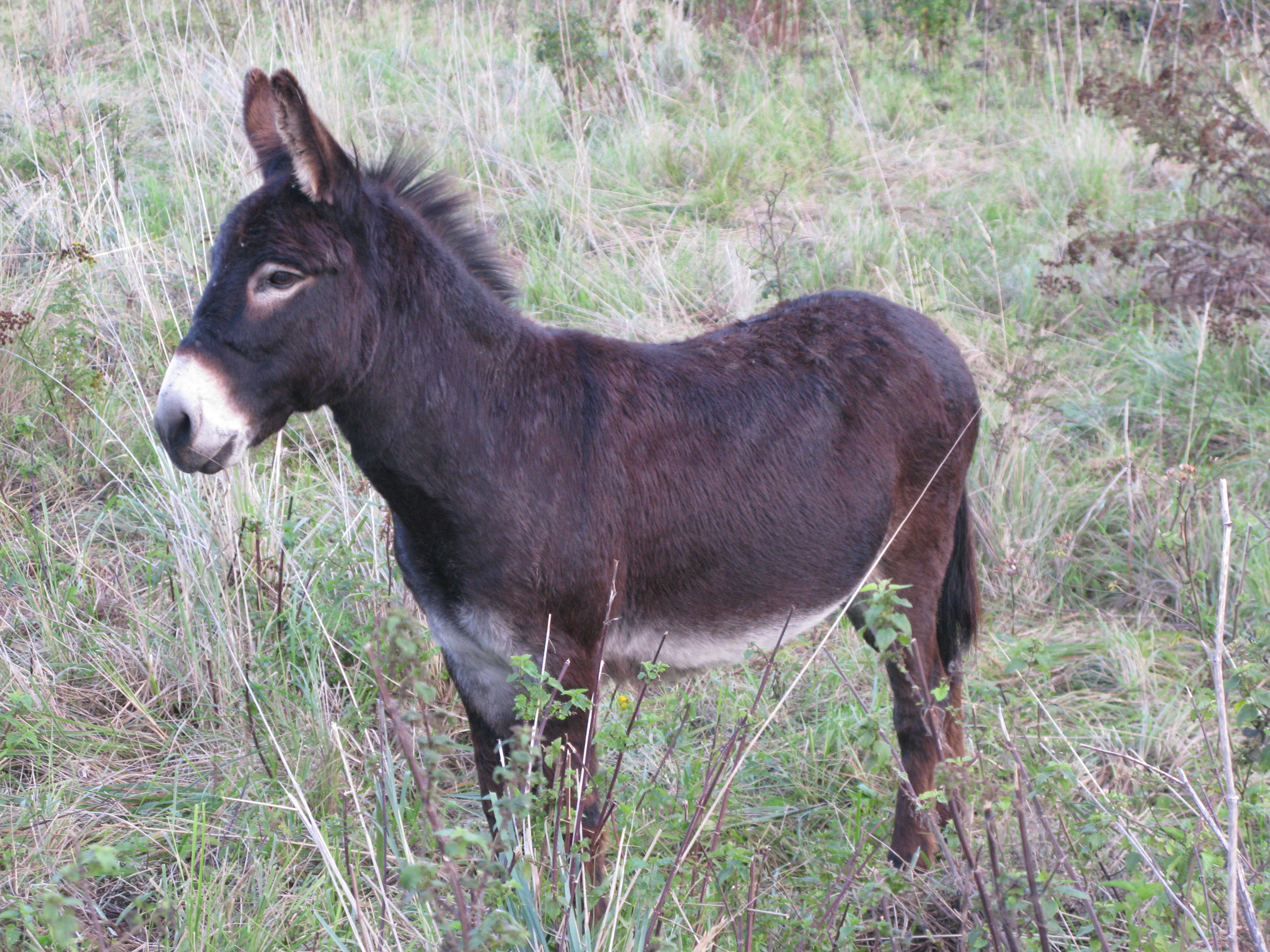
- Conservation status: FAO (2007): no data; SAVE (2008): critical
- Other names: Âne des Pyrénées
- Country of origin: France
- Distribution: south-western France
- Standard: Ministère de l'Agriculture

Traits
- Height: Male: Gascon: 1.25–1.35 m (49–53 in); Catalan: minimum 1.35 m (53 in); Female: Gascon: 1.20–1.30 m (47–51 in); Catalan: minimum 1.30 m (51 in)
- Coat: glossy black, near-black, pangaré black, or chestnut bay

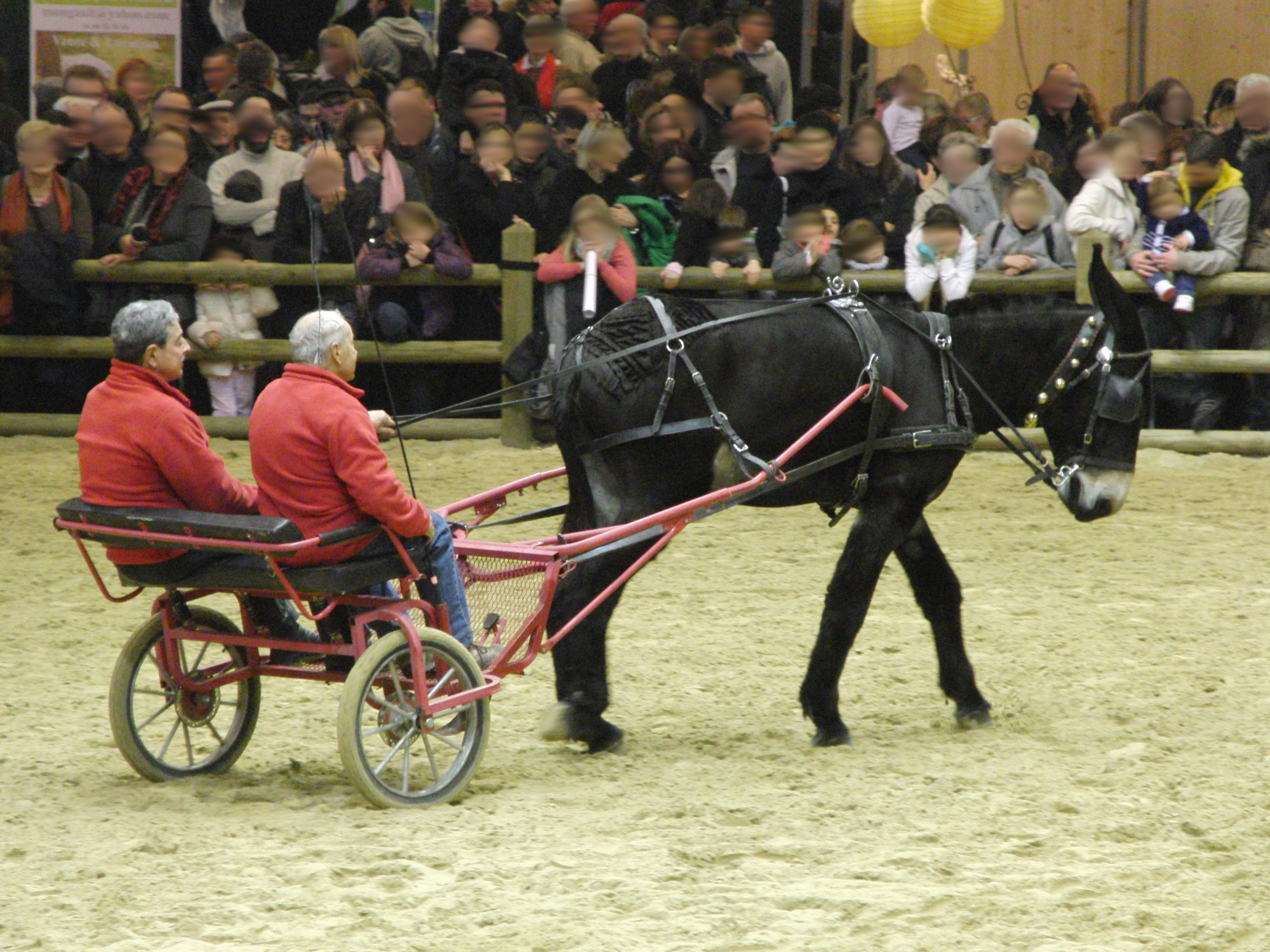
Pyrenean donkey, Catalan type

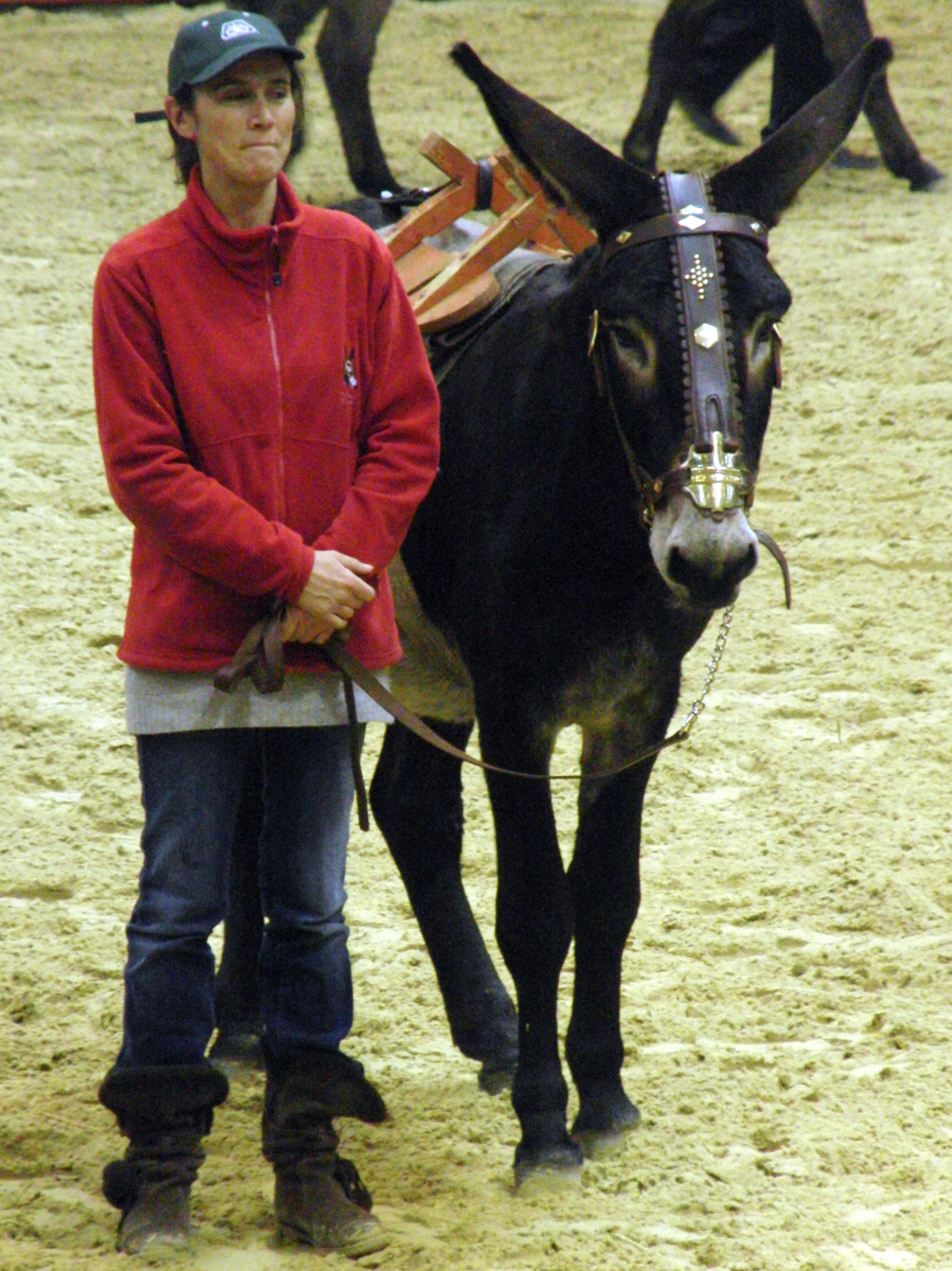
Pyrenean donkey, Gascon type

The Pyrenean, French: Âne des Pyrénées, is a French breed of domestic donkey. It is distributed in a large area of south-western France, covering the whole of the regions of Aquitaine, Midi Pyrénées and Languedoc Roussillon. The largest concentration is in Aquitaine, which is a large part of the historic region of Gascony. The Pyrenean donkey breed unites two quite different types: the short and powerful Gascon type, and the taller and more elegant Catalan type, which is the French population of the Catalan breed of Catalonia, approximately 20% of the total number of which is in the Roussillon.

== History ==
The Âne des Pyrénées was numerous in south-western France at the start of the twentieth century; rural populations in the area fell as a consequence of the First World War, and the donkey population also fell. The effects of the mechanisation of agriculture and transport led to a further decline. The lowest point was reached in the 1990s, when no more than twenty animals remained. The breed was reconstituted with stock imported from Spain. A breeders' association, the Association des Eleveurs d'Anes des Pyrénées, was formed in 1994, and in 1997 the breed was officially recognised by the ministry of agriculture and the Haras Nationaux. The association maintains the stud book for the breed.

== Characteristics ==
The Pyrenean breed consists of donkeys of two quite different types: a short and powerful Gascon type, and a taller and more elegant Catalan type – which is the French population of the Catalan breed of Catalonia, approximately 20% of the total number of which is in the Roussillon.

Jacks of the Gascon type stand some 1.25–1.35 m at the withers, and jennies about 1.20–1.30 m. Catalan jacks measure a minimum of 1.35 m, and jennies a minimum of 1.30 m; there is no maximum height for the Catalan type.

The coat may be glossy black, near-black, pangaré black, or chestnut bay. The lower part of the muzzle and the surround of the eyes are pale, as is the belly; there is no dorsal stripe, shoulder-stripe or zebra-striping of the legs. Most physical characteristics differ between the two types.

== Use ==
The Gascon type was formerly used for agricultural work, both in harness and as a pack animal, carrying wood, hay, ice and the like. As in the past, Catalan jacks are used to sire mules; they may be bred with Castillonnais, Mérens or Navarrin mares of the region.

Jennies may be milked for asses' milk for cosmetic use.
