= Lists of breeds =

These lists of breeds refer to listed breeds of domesticated animals.

== Lists of breeds ==
Species	Lists	Picture
Cat	List of cat breeds List of experimental cat breeds	
Cattle; Taurine cattle Zebu	List of cattle breeds List of dairy cattle breeds List of beef cattle breeds List of French cattle breeds List of Indian cattle breeds List of Italian cattle breeds List of Spanish cattle breeds	
Chicken	List of chicken breeds List of German chicken breeds List of French chicken breeds List of Italian chicken breeds List of Spanish chicken breeds	
Dog; Service dog Police dog	List of dog breeds List of police dog breeds	
Donkey	List of donkey breeds List of French donkey breeds List of Italian donkey breeds List of Iberian donkey breeds	
Domestic duck	List of duck breeds	
Domestic pig	List of pig breeds List of Italian pig breeds	
Domestic rabbit	List of rabbit breeds	
Domestic turkey	List of turkey breeds	
Fancy pigeon	List of pigeon breeds	
Fancy rat Laboratory rat	List of fancy rat varieties List of laboratory rat strains	
Goat	List of goat breeds List of Chinese goat breeds List of Italian goat breeds List of Swiss goat breeds	
Goose	List of goose breeds	
Guinea pig Chinchilla	List of guinea pig breeds	
Honey bee Mexican honey wasp	List of Apis mellifera subspecies	
Horse; Pony	List of horse breeds List of African horse breeds List of Brazilian horse breeds List of French horse breeds List of German horse breeds List of Indian horse breeds List of Iberian horse breeds List of Indonesian horse breeds List of Italian horse breeds List of Japanese horse breeds	
Sheep	List of sheep breeds List of Italian sheep breeds	
Water buffalo	List of water buffalo breeds	

== See also ==
- Lists of breeds
- List of animal names
- Biodiversity
- Rare breed
- Entente Européenne d'Aviculture et de Cuniculture
- Rare Breeds Survival Trust
- Lists of poultry breeds
