= Istituto Incremento Ippico per la Sicilia =

Coordinates: 37.50173°N 15.07413°E

The Istituto Incremento Ippico per la Sicilia (transl. Equine Increment Institute for Sicily) is an institute dedicated to the support of equine (horses and donkey) activities and breeding, located on via Vittorio Emanuele #508 in the city of Catania, region of Sicily, Italy. The site also houses Musca or Museo delle Carrozze, that is Museum of the Carriage, which displays carriages and equine equipment from the previous century.

== History ==
The institute derives from the Regio Deposito Stalloni (Royal Repository of Stallions), established by the Italian Ministry of War in 1884 with the objective of preserving and proliferating the Puro Sangue Orientale horses of Italy. At the time, this middle-eastern-derived horse was prized as a work-horse for the military. In 1932, with the decreasing military utility of horses, the Deposito was placed under the jurisdiction of the Ministry of Agriculture and Forestry. In recent decades, the institute has dedicated efforts at preserving breeds of horse and donkey particular to Sicily, mainly the Orientale and Anglo-Orientale horse breeds, and the Ragusano and Pantesco donkeys. The two latter autochthonous donkey breeds are at risk of extinction, with their numbers drastically dwindling during the Second World war. The institute manages a more rural farm, Tenuta Ambelia. Many of the horses and donkeys bred are passed on to farmers and breeders.

Prior to 1884, the locale of the institute served as a "retreat house" or "spirituality center" for the Jesuit order, but now houses varied functions, including the museums, stables and a riding circle.
