= Benjamín Rubio =

Spanish trade unionist (1925–2007)

Benjamin Rubio (Bustarga, Leon, 1925 - August 25, 2007) was an active trade unionist in the Laciana area.

== Biography ==
Benjamin Rubio was born in Bustarga, in Ancares (Leon) on October 12, 1925. During the Spanish Civil War he saw the repression of the Nationalists and it scarred his life forever. At the age of 16 he began working in the mining industry, with an anarcho-syndicalist influence, and served as liaison between the army of the "Maquis" and the Léon-Galicia Guerrilla Group, led by César Ríos, between 1942 and 1949. During these years, he suffered persecution and finally was imprisoned.

After leaving prison, he moved to the Leonesa Region of Laciana, to return to work in the mines. Leaving behind its anarcho-syndicalist influences, the Communist Party of Spain (PCE) contacted him for the reorganization of its structure in the Spanish interior. Thus, he became the underground communist leader for León and Galicia. His participation in the Mining Strike of 1962 (called "The Huelgona"), sets an important historic precedent, to settle one of the first permanent Workers' Commissions. Since the late 1950s, the trade-union policy of the PCE has marked the over-involvement of the Vertical unions. Various Asturian miners' strikes (1958, 1959, ...), had formed the Workers Commission, which dissolved by the end of the conflict. The difference from the Laciana case is that, during that strike, the workers managed to introduce 12 representatives into the Company Board controlled by the Ponferrada Mining, Iron and Steel Company and close to Francoist Spain. One of those representatives was Benjamin Rubio, settling a Permanent Work Commission, and whose extension will be the birth of the Workers Commission Union (CCOO), of which he became an important leader.

In the early years of the 1970s, as part of the Anthracite Strike, and with CCOO outlawed and persecuted, Benjamin Rubio was called on to travel to the UK to seek support for the Workers' Commissions from the European trade unions, support which he obtained. For several years he continued his work as leader of the Spanish Communist Party and the Workers' Commissions, participating in the Spanish Transition. Finally, he left the front line of politics, beginning a collaboration with the War and Exile Association (AGE) in the struggle for the recovery of historical memory and recognition of the rebels as soldiers and not as bandits. Between these activities, in 2000 he collaborated with the Caravan of Memory, which brought together several guerrillas from Galicia and Leon in Villablino, initiating a struggle for the memoirs.

Some months before dying, he published his book "Memoirs of the Anti-Franco Struggle", where important biographical and historical aspects are collected, such as the lyrics of Guerrilla anthems and other information. He also participated in the Documentary "La Guerrilla de la Memoria" (The Guerrilla of Memory).

He died on August 25, 2007.
