= Bloc Català =

The Bloc Català (Catalan Bloc) is a Catalan nationalist political party in Pyrénées-Orientales (France) (or Northern Catalonia as Bloc Català refers to it). It was established on October 23, 2001.

It defines itself as a center-left wing political party. One of its proposals is the establishment of a "northern Catalan region" in France. This party was one of the organizations that promoted a movement against the denomination Septimanie, proposed by Georges Frêche, the president of the region of Languedoc-Roussillon. As a symbol of a so-called Catalan resistance against that move, they will adopt a disguised donkey as mascot.

It participates since 2002 in all the elections of Northern Catalonia: cantonal, legislative, regional and European elections. So far, it has not won election.

On December 3, 2006, the Bloc Català changed its name and it was converted to an autonomous federation, representative of Northern Catalonia, of the Spanish Catalan political party Convergència Democràtica de Catalunya.
