= Pónei da Terceira =

Portuguese breed of horse

- Conservation status: FAO (2007): not listed; DAD-IS (2024): at risk/critical
- Country of origin: Portugal
- Distribution: Terceira, Azores

Traits
- Weight: not over 350 kg; Male: 265 kg; Female: 254 kg
- Height: not over 148 cm; Male: 130 cm; Female: 127 cm

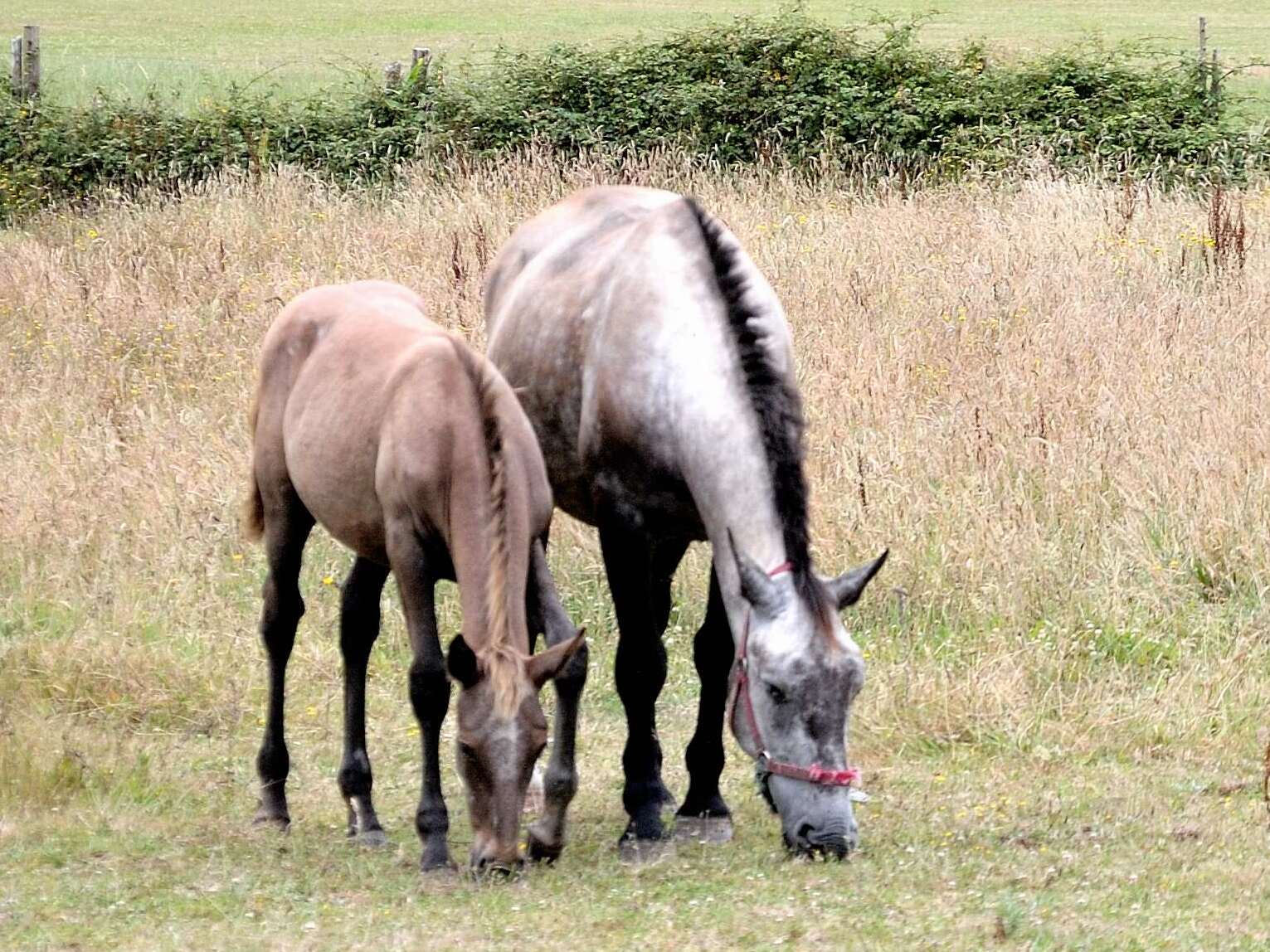
Mare and foal of uncertain breed in the Azores

The Pónei da Terceira is a Portuguese breed of small horse native to the Atlantic island of Terceira, in the Azores archipelago. It was formally recognised as breed in 2014, after a period of research and recovery lasting some fifteen years.

It is one of four Portuguese breeds, the others being the Garrano, the Lusitano and the Sorraia.

== History ==
The Pónei da Terceira was formally recognised as breed in 2014, after a period of research and recovery lasting some fifteen years; it is the fourth horse breed to receive official recognition in Portugal. A breed association, the Associação dos Criadores e Amigos do Pónei da Terceira, was constituted in 2010. The programme of recovery and conservation of the remaining population of the horses was overseen by the University of the Azores, which is also the principal breeder – in 2014 it had a breeding herd of over fifty head. The university also manages the conservation programme for the endangered Burro da Ilha Graciosa breed of small donkey.

In 2024 the registered population consisted of 36 stallions and 68 breeding mares, in the hands of 20 breeders.

== Characteristics ==
The Pónei da Terceira is small, with a maximum height of 148 cm and maximum weight of 350 kg; average height at the withers is 130 cm for stallions and a few centimetres less for mares. Its morphology is that of a horse rather than a pony, with an appearance comparable to that of the Lusitano. The coat may be of any colour; horses with blue eyes are not eligible for registration.
