= Bourbonnais Donkey =

Breed of donkey

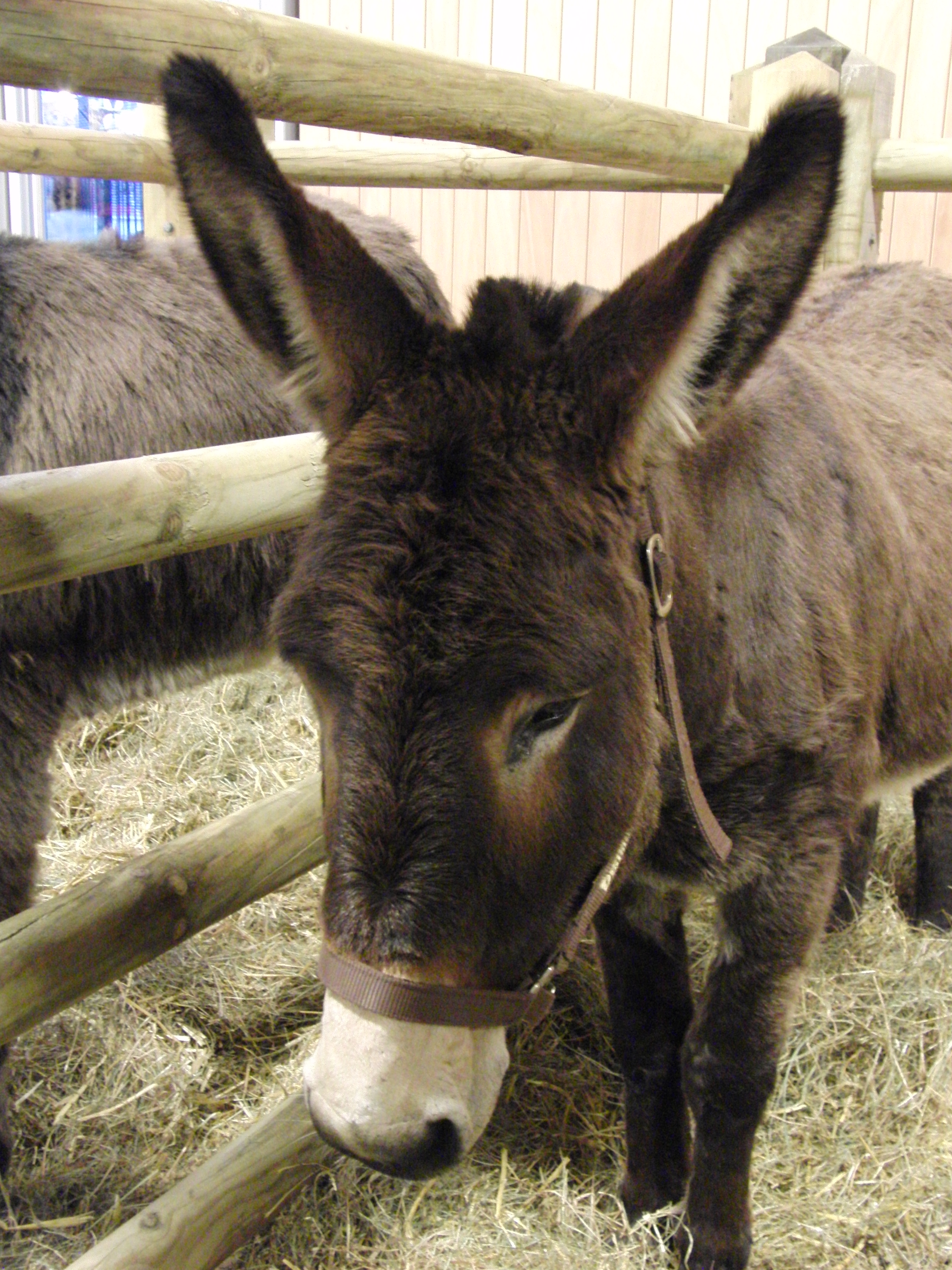

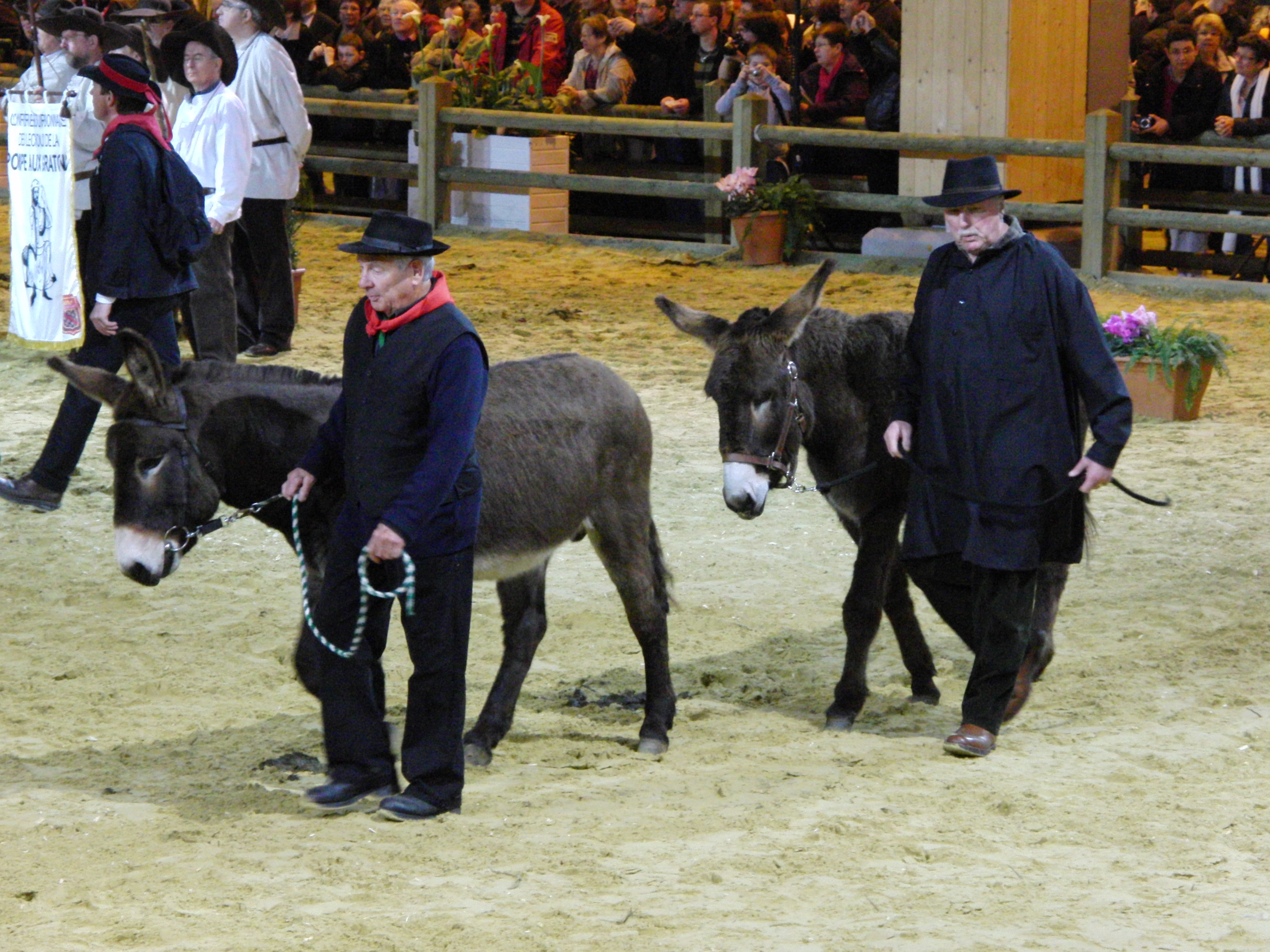
- At the Salon International de l'Agriculture in Paris, 2010
- Conservation status: FAO (2007): no data; SAVE (2008): endangered; DAD-IS (2025): at risk/critical-maintained
- Other names: Âne Bourbonnais
- Country of origin: France
- Distribution: Bourbonnais
- Standard: Ministère de l'Agriculture (in French)

Traits
- Height: Male: 1.20–1.35 m; Female: 1.18–1.28 m
- Coat: chocolate, bay or dark bay, with darker dorsal stripe and shoulder-stripe

The Bourbonnais Donkey, French: Âne Bourbonnais, is a French breed of domestic donkey from the historic region of the Bourbonnais, which corresponds roughly with the modern département of Allier, in the Auvergne region of central France. It was in the past used as a pack animal, for hauling barges, and to pull light gigs. The breed was recognised by the Ministère de l'Agriculture, the French ministry of agriculture, in 2002. The stud-book is kept by the Association de l'Ane Bourbonnais, an association of breeders.

== History ==
The first records of donkeys in the Bourbonnais date from 1862, when there were about 6000; by the beginning of the twentieth century there were 7700. In the 1970s the number had fallen to about 500, and when the Association de l'Ane Bourbonnais was formed in 1994, it identified barely 50.

The breed was officially recognised in October 2002 by the Ministère de l'Agriculture, the French ministry of agriculture, and the Haras Nationaux, the national stud. The stud-book for the breed is maintained by the association; in 2014 almost 200 animals were registered. A total of 328 animals was reported to DAD-IS for 2022, including 204 breeding jennies; in 2025 the conservation status of the breed was "at risk/critical-maintained".

== Characteristics ==
Jacks measure 1.25–1.35 m, jennies 1.18–1.28 m or up to 2 cm more. The coat is chocolate brown, bay or dark bay, with a darker dorsal stripe and shoulder stripe; the legs may show zebra-striping. The lower part of the muzzle is grey-white, as is the belly.

== Use ==
Like the larger Grand Noir du Berry from slightly further north, the Bourbonnais was used as a pack animal to carry vegetables, coal, milk and the like, and also as a draught animal both for agricultural work and to haul barges on the canals of the region. In the early twentieth century it was also used to pull light gigs to transport visitors to the fashionable spa at Vichy. In the twenty-first century it is used as a pack animal for hiking, or for light driving.
