= Âne Corse =

French breed of donkey

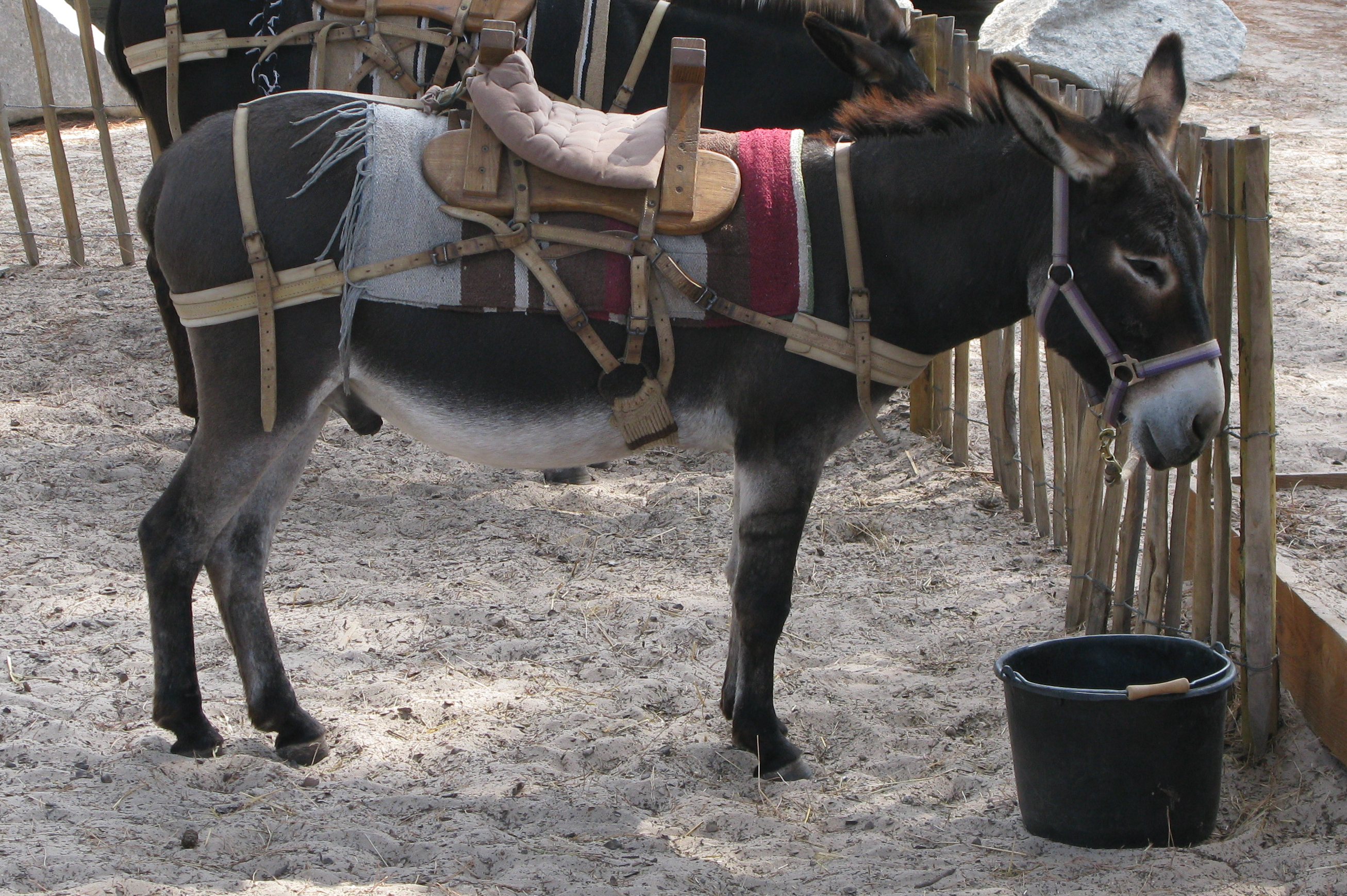
- Conservation status: FAO (2007): not listed; SAVE (2008): critical; DAD-IS (2025): at risk/critical
- Other names: Âne corse; U sumeru corsu
- Country of origin: France
- Distribution: Corsica

Traits
- Coat: grey or black

The Âne Corse, Corsican: U sumeru corsu, is a French breed of domestic donkey from the Mediterranean island of Corsica, a région and territorial collectivity of France. It was formerly numerous in the island, but numbers have fallen alarmingly. From about 2010 two associations sought its official recognition.

It was recognised as a breed in 2020, and a stud-book was established in the same year. Like the other seven donkey breeds of France, it is an endangered breed; a total population of 1500 to 2000 head was reported in 2024.

== History ==
The indigenous donkey of Corsica is small – standing approximately 98 cm at the withers – and is usually grey. It is thought to have been present on the island since Roman times. In modern times attempts have been made to increase its size by cross-breeding with imported stock including the Catalan from Spain, donkeys from the French mainland, and the Martina Franca of Puglia in Italy, which has led to the development of a larger black type of donkey, standing 120–130 cm.

Before the mechanisation of transport and agriculture in the 1930s there were more than 20000 donkeys in Corsica. Until the 1960s large numbers were sold at miserable prices to the meat markets of Italy and mainland France; there is no tradition of eating donkey meat in Corsica, and the recent appearance of donkey salami in shops there is a consequence of tourist demand. Two associations, A Runcata ('the bray') and Isul'âne, were formed for its protection, and the first steps towards seeking official recognition for the breed were taken in 2010.

In 2024 the total population of the Âne Corse was estimated at 1500 to 2000, including 50 breeding jennies and 10 jacks. Its conservation status was not listed by the Food and Agriculture Organization of the United Nations in 2007, but was listed as "critical" by the SAVE Foundation in 2008. In 2025 it was listed in DAD-IS as "at risk/critical".
