= List of donkey breeds =

This list of breeds of domestic donkey is based on country reports to the international DAD-IS database.

== Breeds ==
Breed name	English name if used	Country	Notes	Image
Abkhazskaya		Russian Federation		
Abyssinian		Ethiopia		
Algerian		Algeria	draught or meat animal; chestnut or grey	
American Mammoth Jackstock; Mammoth; Mammoth Jackstock		USA	size breed: any large donkey over a size limit	
Anatolian		Turkey		
Âne Africain		Central African Republic, Chad		
Afghan donkey		Afghanistan		
Âne du Bourbonnais	Bourbonnais	France		
Âne du Cotentin	Cotentin	France		
Âne du Gourma		Mali		
Âne du Miankala		Mali		
Âne du plateau Dogon		Mali		
Âne du Sahel		Mall		
Âne du Yatenga		Mali		
Âne locale		Madagascar		
Âne Normand	Norman	France		
Âne Petit Gris du Berry		France	extinct	
Âne		Togo		
Âne wallon		Belgium		
Anger		Iran		
Armyanskaya		Armenia		
Asin		Niger		
Asino dell’Asinara	Asinara	Italy	critically endangered; indigenous to the Isola dell'Asinara, Sardinia	
Asino Argentato di Sologno		Italy		
Asino Baio Lucano		Italy		
Asino dell’Amiata; Amiatina		Italy	Monte Amiata, province of Grosseto, Tuscany	
Asino dell'Irpinia		Italy	extinct; provinces of Benevento and Avellino	
Asino di Castel Morrone	Castel Morrone	Italy	probably extinct; around Castel Morrone in the Province of Caserta, Campania	
Asino di Martina Franca	Martina Franca	Italy	Martina Franca and neighbouring areas in south-east Murgia, in the Metropolitan City of Bari and the provinces of Taranto and Brindisi in Puglia	
Asino di Sant'Alberto		Italy	extinct; province of Forlì-Cesena	
Asino Emiliano		Italy	extinct	
Asino Grigio Siciliano; Grigio Siciliano		Italy	Sicily	
Asino Pantesco; Asino di Pantelleria; Pantesco		Italy	from the island of Pantelleria, Sicily	
Asino Pugliese		Italy	Puglia; regional variants include the Asino delle Marche, Asino della Basilicata and Asino Leccese	
Asino Ragusano	Ragusano	Italy	from Ragusa in Sicily, and neighbouring areas	
Asino Romagnolo	Romagnolo	Italy	from Emilia–Romagna	
Sardinian donkey Asino Sardo	Sardinian	Italy	from Sardinia	
Asino Sardo Grigio Crociato		Italy	from Sardinia	
Asnal Criolin		Cuba		
Asno		Chile		
Asno Americana		Cuba		
Asno Andaluz	Andalusian	Spain		
Asno Balear		Spain		
Asno Criollo		Venezuela		
Asno de las Encartaciones		Spain	Basque country	
Australian donkey		Australia		
Barockesel	Austrian-Hungarian White Donkey	Austria	off-white coat color	
Azerbaidzhanskaya		Azerbaijan		
Baudet du Poitou	Poitevin; Poitou	France	the Poitou donkey was developed for the sole purpose of the jacks being mated with mares to produce mules. It is a large donkey breed with a very long shaggy coat and no dorsal stripe	
Benderi		Iran		
Biyang		China		
Bourik		Haiti		
Brasil		Venezuela		
Bulgaro		Venezuela		
Bulgarian donkey		Bulgaria		
Burro		Mexico, Nicaragua, United States	small donkey of Mexico and the U.S. seen in both domesticated and feral states; some feral burros in the western U.S. are protected by federal law	
Burro Criollo		El Salvador		
Burro da Ilha Graciosa; Burro Anão da Graciosa		Portugal	endangered, 90 left	
Burro de Miranda; Burro do Planalto Mirandes; Mirandes; Raça asinina de Miranda; Transmontano	Miranda	Portugal	endangered	
Burro Kentucky		El Salvador, Honduras		
Caninde		Brazil		
Cardao		Brazil		
Cariovilli		Italy	extinct; province of L'Aquila in Abruzzo	
Catalana	Catalan	Spain		
Chigetai		Kazakhstan		
China North		China		
Comune		Albania		
Creole		Guyana		
Âne corse; U sumeru corsu; Corsican		Corsica		
Criollo		Peru		
Cyprus donkey		Cyprus		
Dagestanskaya		Russian Federation		
Damascus		Israel, Syrian Arab Republic		
Dezhou		China		
Domaci balkanski magarac	Balkan	Serbia, Montenegro		
Dongolawi		Sudan		
Irish donkey		Ireland		
Donkey		Saint Kitts and Nevis		
Egypt Baladi		Egypt		
Egyptian		Egypt		
English donkey		Australia		
Etbai		Sudan		
Ezel		Netherlands		
Georgian ass		Georgia		
Grand Noir du Berry		France	former province of Berry; possibly derived from Catalan	
Green		Barbados		
Grey		Suriname		
Grigio Viterbese; Viterbese		Italy	province of Viterbo in Lazio	
Guangling		China		
Guanzhong		China		
Hamadan		Iran, Russian Federation		
Hassawi		Egypt		
Hmar Malti	Maltese	Malta		
Huaibei		China		
Indian		India		
Iranian		Iran		
Istarski magarac		Croatia	Istria	
Italian		Serbia		
Jack Norteamericano		Venezuela		
Jiami		China		
Jirnrna		Ethiopia		
Jinnan		China		
Jordanian donkey		Jordan		
Kakhetinskaya		Russian Federation		
Karakaçan		Turkey		
Kara-Kalpakskaya		Uzbekistan		
Kashan		Iran		
Kassala		Eritrea		
Kazakhskaya		Kazakhstan		
Kirgizskaya		Kyrgyzstan		
Kulun		China		
Liangzhou		China		
Libyan		Libya		
Linxian		China		
Magyar parlagi szamár		Hungary		
Majorera		Spain		
Mannar		Sri Lanka		
Maryisltaya		Turkmenistan		
Masai		Kenya, Tanzania		
Masri		Egypt		
Merzifon		Turkey		
Meskhet-Dzhavakhetskaya		Uzbekistan, Turkmenistan		
Miniature donkey		USA		
Moldavian Local		Moldova		
Moroccan		Morocco		
Muscat		Tanzania		
National Genatic		Yemen		
Native of North Africa		Mali, Mauritania, Senegal		
Nordestina		Brazil		
Ogaden		Ethiopia		
Paulista		Brazil		
Pega		Brazil		
Peruano		Venezuela		
Ponui		New Zealand		
Primorsko dinarski magarac		Croatia		
Âne de Provence	Provence	France	Provence	
Puttalam Buruwa		Sri Lanka		
Âne des Pyrénées	Pyrenean	France	Aquitaine, Midi Pyrénées, Languedoc Roussillon; also called Gascon; similar to Catalan but smaller	
Qinghai		China		
Qinqyang		China		
Qirmani		Yemen		
Qubressy		Jordan		
Riffawi		Sudan		
Romanian donkey		Romania		
Saidi		Egypt		
Sennar		Ethiopia		
Shanbei		China		
Sibbiani		Yemen		
Sjevernojadranski magarac		Croatia		
Somali		Djibouti, Kenya, Somalia, Yemen		
South-west		China		
Spotted		United States		
Standard		United States		
Subei		China		
Sudanese Pack		Sudan		
Syrian		Israel, Syrian Arab Republic		
Thüringer Waldesel		Germany		
Tadzhikskaya		Tajikistan		
Taihang		China		
Tibetan		China, Nepal		
Toposa		Sudan		
Tswana		Botswana		
Tunisian		Tunisia		
Turkmenskaya		Turkmenistan		
Uzbekskaya		Uzbekistan		
Ugandan donkey		Uganda		
Xinjiang		China		
Yangyuan		China		
Yunnan		China		
Zamorano-Leonés		Spain		
