= North American donkeys =

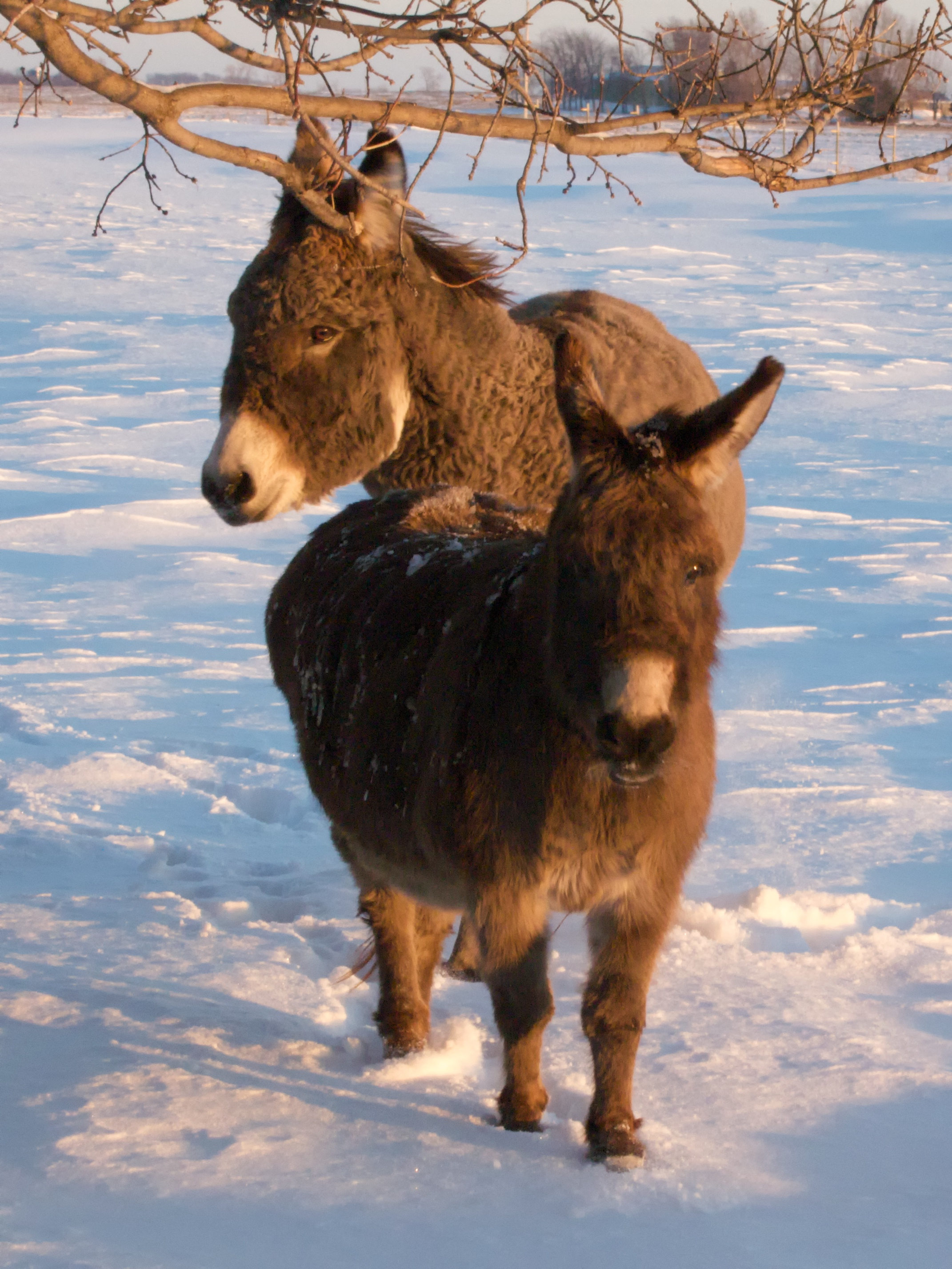
A miniature donkey and a standard donkey, mother and daughter

North American donkeys constitute approximately 0.1% of the worldwide donkey population. (Note: "North America" here with the narrow meaning of "Canada and the United States" – many Central American countries have donkeys, and Mexico has a large number.) Donkeys were brought from Europe to the New World in the fifteenth century with the Second Voyage of Christopher Columbus, and subsequently spread into Mexico. They first reached what is now the United States in the late seventeenth century. Donkeys arrived in large numbers in the western United States during the gold rushes of the nineteenth century, as pack animals and for use in mines and ore-grinding mills. From about 1785, some large donkeys were imported from Europe to the eastern part of the continent.

There are no true-breeding North American donkey breeds. Breed societies in Canada and the United States register donkeys according to their size, as miniature, standard or mammoth donkeys. These are reported as breeds to the DAD-IS database of the Food and Agriculture Organization of the United Nations by the National Animal Germplasm Program of the Agricultural Research Service of the US Department of Agriculture, as are the Burro – a feral population of the western United States – and the Spotted, a color breed.

== History ==
The first asses came to the Americas aboard ships of the second voyage of Christopher Columbus, landing at Hispaniola in 1495. In the early days of the conquistadores, jackasses were highly valued as sires for mules, which were esteemed as riding animals by the Spanish, and reserved for the nobility. Mules were bred for expeditions to mainland America, with males preferred for pack animals and the females for riding. The first shipment of mules, with three jacks and twelve jennies, arrived in México via Cuba ten years after the conquest of the Aztecs in 1521. Mules were used in silver mines, and each Spanish outpost across the empire bred its own mules with its own jack.

The first known presence of donkeys in what is now the United States were during the initial settlement of Jamestown. Prior to 2025, the first presence was sometimes reported to date to 1679, when a Jesuit priest named Eusebio Kino took some from Sonora in Spanish Mexico to a new mission at San Xavier del Bac in what is now Arizona; however, Kino did not reach the Americas before about 1681, and was not in Sonora until 1687. Donkeys arrived in large numbers in the western United States during the gold rushes of the nineteenth century, both as pack animals and for use in mines and ore-grinding mills. The major use of donkeys came to an end with the end of the mining boom and the extensive construction of railroads. Donkeys had little remaining value and many were simply turned loose, giving rise to a feral population.

From about 1785, some large donkeys were imported from Europe to the eastern United States, and were used for the production of mules. In 1888 the American Breeders Association of Jacks and Jennets started a stud-book for these animals under the name American Mammoth Jack. In 1923 this was merged with the Standard Jack and Jennet Registry of America, which had been set up in 1908; in 1988 the name was changed to American Mammoth Jackstock Registry. Breeds that may have influenced the mammoth include the Maltese, the Baudet du Poitou, the Andalusian, the Majorcan and the Catalan.

In the twentieth century, donkeys came to be more frequently kept as pets in the United States and in other wealthy nations. In 1929 Robert Green of New York imported seven donkeys of the small indigenous Sardinian breed to the United States. The first foal was born in the same year. Although never considered miniature in their country of origin, these animals were soon known as Miniature or Miniature Mediterranean donkeys. Green was a lifelong advocate, and said of them: "Miniature donkeys possess the affectionate nature of a Newfoundland, the resignation of a cow, the durability of a mule, the courage of a tiger, and an intellectual capability only slightly inferior to man's." By 1935 there were fifty-two of them, and some were sold. Further Sardinian donkeys were imported, as well as similar but quite distinct Sicilian animals. A register of miniature donkeys was started in 1958 by Bea Langfeld, who was the first professional breeder of miniature donkeys in the United States; in 1987 it was merged into that of the American Donkey and Mule Society, which was formed in 1967.

== Characteristics ==
Both the Canadian Donkey and Mule Association and the American Donkey and Mule Society register donkeys according to their size, as miniature, standard or mammoth donkeys.

Adult miniature donkeys stand 36 in (90 cm) or less at the withers; (Note: In Canada and the United States donkeys are usually measured in inches; corresponding measurements in hands are: miniature < 9 h; small standard 9–12 h; large standard 12–13.2 h (jennies) or 12–14 h (males); mammoth over 13.2 h (jennies), over 14 h (males).) small standard donkeys stand from over 36 to 48 in (90 to 120 cm) and large standard donkeys from over 48 to 54 in (120 to 135 cm) for jennies, or to 56 in (140 cm) for jacks and geldings. Mammoth jennies are taller than 54 in (135 cm), and mammoth jacks and geldings over 56 in (140 cm).

Any donkey with at least two spots behind the throatlatch and above the legs can be registered with the American Council of Spotted Asses under the trademarked name American Spotted Ass.
