= Viterbese =

Italian breed of donkey

- Conservation status: FAO (2007): extinct
- Other names: Asino di Allumiere; Asino Viterbese; Grigio Viterbese
- Country of origin: Italy
- Distribution: Lazio
- Standard: MIPAAF
- Use: burden; light draught; donkey racing; meat; milk; hippotherapy

Traits
- Height: Male: 119–137 cm; Female: 112–135 cm

The Viterbese or Italian: Grigio Viterbese is an Italian breed of donkey from the Lazio region of central Italy. It is particularly associated with the town and province of Viterbo from which it takes its name, and also with the Monti della Tolfa and the town of Allumiere in the province of Rome; for this reason it may sometimes be known as the Asino di Allumiere. In 2007 it was reported by the Food and Agriculture Organization of the United Nations as extinct. In 2012 it was added to the list of autochthonous donkey breeds of limited distribution recognised by the Ministero delle Politiche Agricole Alimentari e Forestali, the Italian ministry of agriculture and forestry. A total population of 153 head was reported in the same year.
