= Fariñeiro =

Spanish breed of donkey

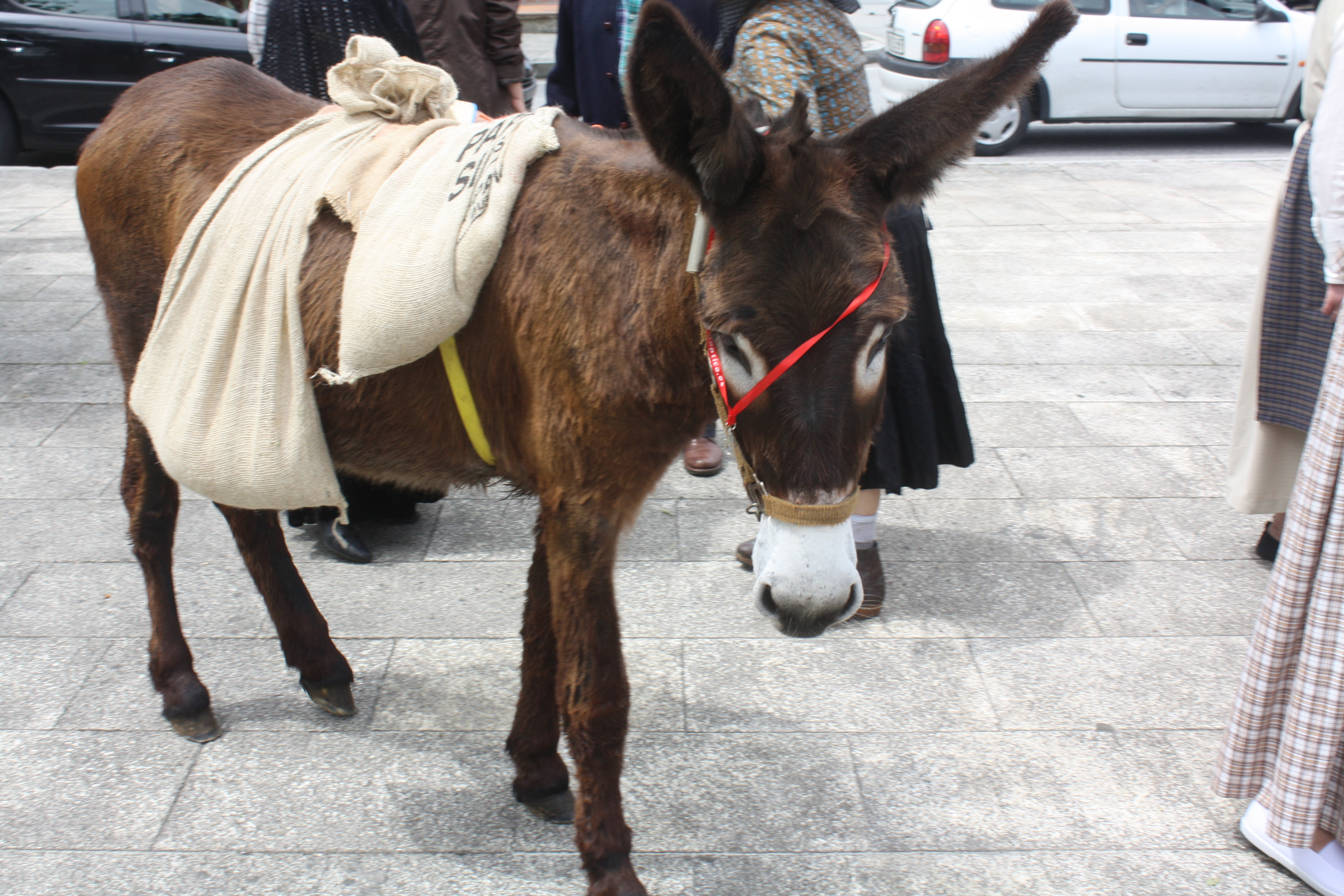
- Conservation status: FAO (2007): not listed; SAVE (2008): not listed
- Other names: Burro Fariñeiro; Asno Gellego
- Country of origin: Spain
- Distribution: Galicia
- Standard: (not recognised)

Traits
- Weight: 120–180 kg
- Height: 1.00–1.20 m
- Coat: grey or dun

The Fariñeiro or Burro Fariñeiro is a Spanish breed of small domestic donkey indigenous to the autonomous community of Galicia, in north-west Spain. Its name derives from its former use as a pack animal to transport sacks of flour (Galician: fariña). It may also be referred to as the Spanish: Asno Gallego. It does not have official recognition, and its numbers are severely reduced. It is found mainly in the Península del Morrazo in the province of Pontevedra, in the area surrounding Betanzos in the province of A Coruña, in the comarcas of the los Ancares and O Caurel areas of the province of Lugo and in the mountains of the province of Ourense.

== History ==
The Fariñeiro is not recognised by the Ministerio de Agricultura, Alimentación y Medio Ambiente, the Spanish ministry of agriculture, nor listed among the autochthonous Spanish animal breeds "in danger of extinction"; it is not among the breeds reported by Spain to DAD-IS.

It was in the past, and may still be, used as a beast of burden in a variety of tasks, including the transport of flour which gives it its name, carrying grapes from the vineyard during the grape harvest, and carrying the seaweed that was collected on the Atlantic beaches to be used as agricultural fertiliser.

In 1999 a census of livestock by the Instituto Nacional de Estadística counted 14,649 donkeys in Galicia, the highest population of any Spanish autonomous community. The number conforming to the traditional small Fariñeiro type was estimated in 2009 at 180, with a very low number of breeding jacks; many of them were old animals, and they were dispersed over a very wide geographical area. The population was declining at an alarming rate. In the same year, a decree that would give protection to Galician breeds including the Fariñeiro had been awaiting approval by the Xunta de Galicia for more than a year.

The breed comes under the responsibility of the Centro de Recursos Zooxenéticos de Galicia, the centre for genetic resources of Galicia, and there is an association for its protection, the Asociación para la Protección y Defensa Medioambiental del Burro Fariñeiro de Galicia.

A small number of the donkeys have been introduced to the island of A Toxa, in O Grove on the Atlantic coast, as part of a conservation and environmental reclamation project.

== Characteristics ==
The Fariñeiro is smaller than other mainland Spanish donkey breeds; it stands about 1.00-1.20 metres at the withers and weighs 120–180 kg. The coat is fine, dense and smooth, of medium length; it is grey or pale brown in colour, and paler on the underparts. The darker dorsal stripe and shoulder-stripe may be more or less distinct.
