= Abyssinian donkey =

Breed of donkey

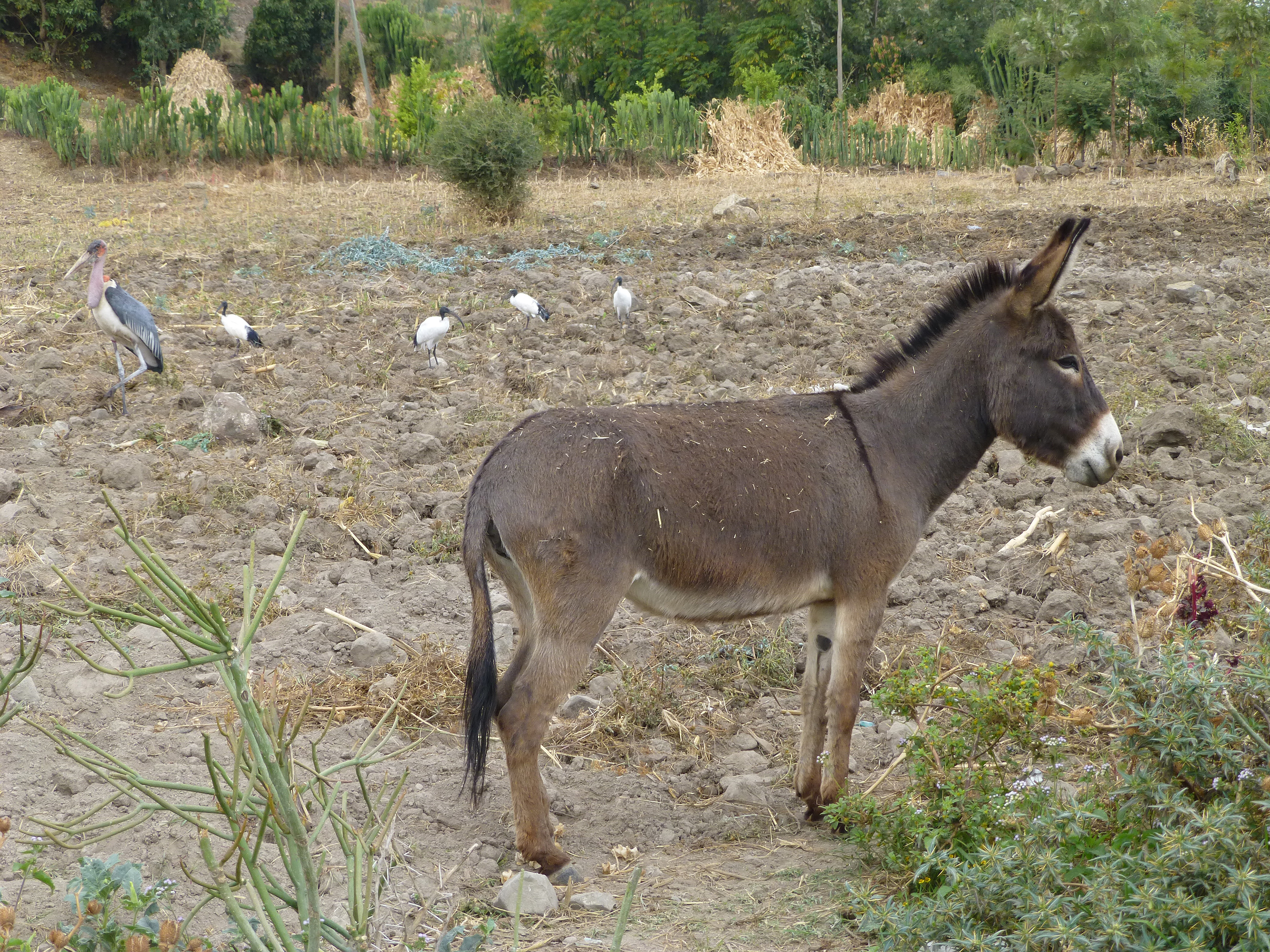
- Country of origin: Ethiopia

The Abyssinian donkey also called the Ethiopian donkey is a breed of donkey native to Ethiopia. It is used as a beast of burden by the indigenous people and has been described as the "backbone" of rural transportation.

== See also ==
- List of donkey breeds
