= Burro da Graciosa =

Portuguese breed of donkey

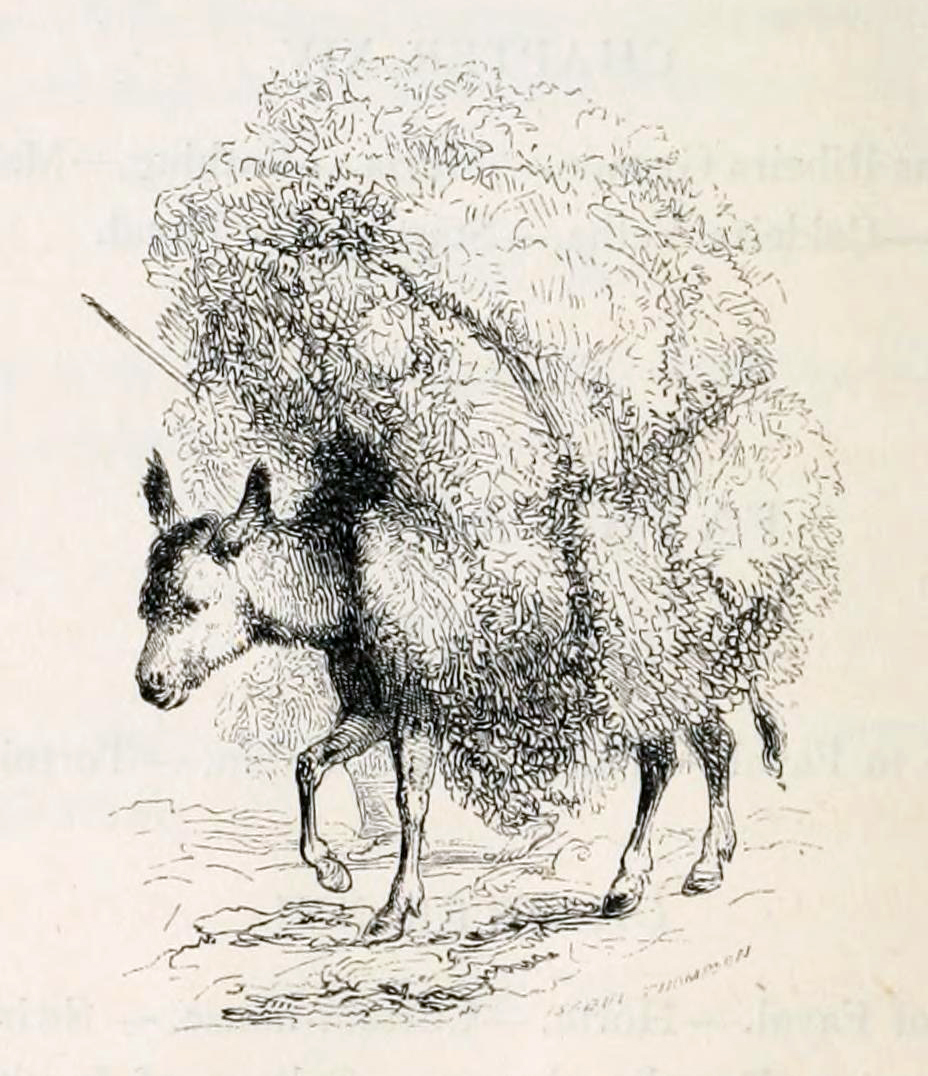
- Engraving of a donkey on the island of São Miguel in the Azores, from: Joseph and Henry Bullar, A winter in the Azores; and a summer at the baths of the Furnas, 1841
- Conservation status: FAO (2007): not listed; SAVE (2008): critical; DAD-IS (2024): at risk/critical
- Other names: Burro Anão da Graciosa; Burro da Ilha Graciosa
- Country of origin: Portugal
- Distribution: Graciosa, Azores

Traits
- Weight: Male: 160 kg; Female: 150 kg
- Height: average 1.058 cm; Male: 1.10 m; Female: 1.05 m
- Coat: pale grey or brown, occasionally black or bay

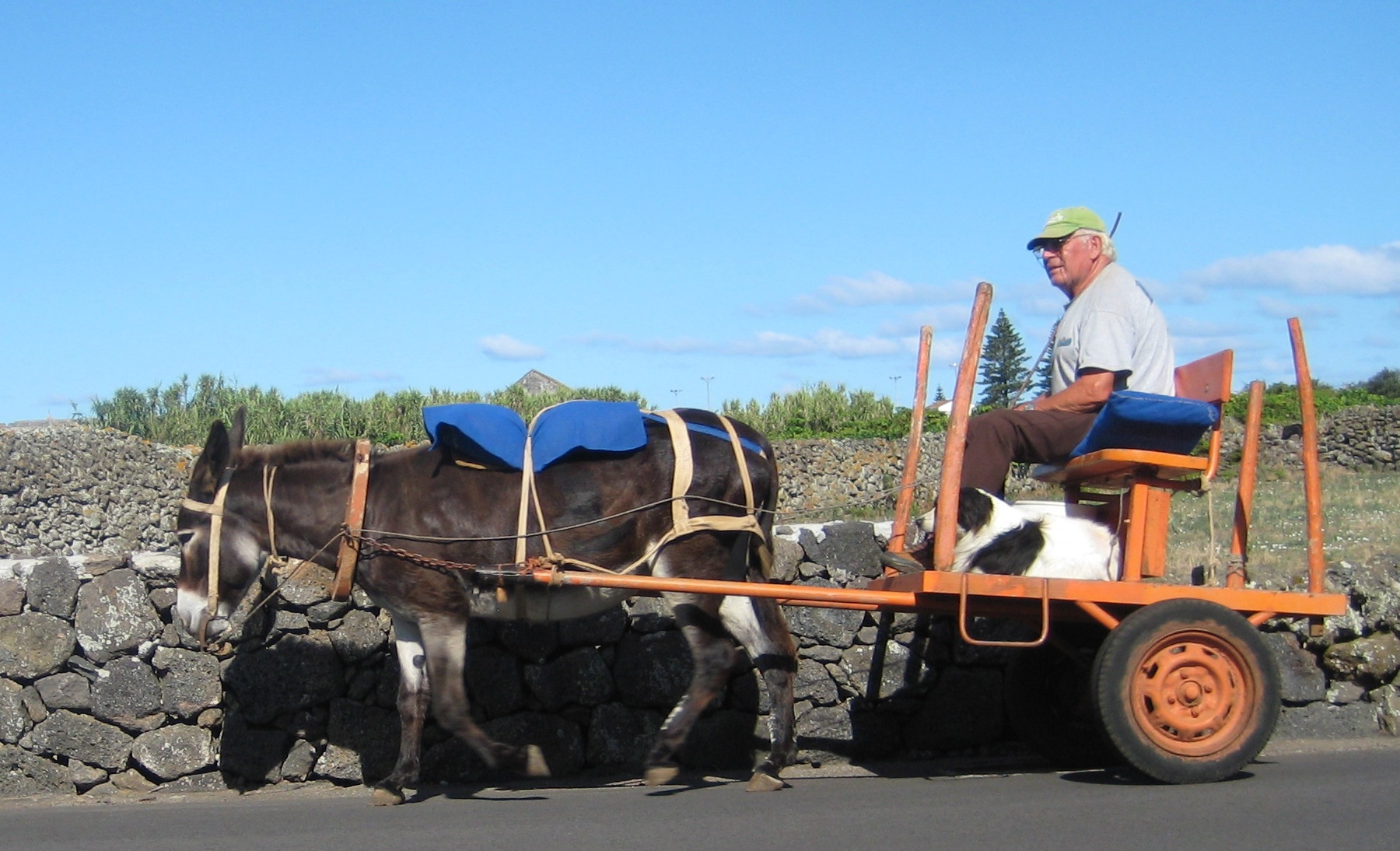
Donkey-cart near Santa Cruz da Graciosa

The Burro da Graciosa or Burro Anão da Graciosa is a Portuguese breed of small domestic donkey endemic to the island of Graciosa, in the North Atlantic archipelago of the Azores, which are an autonomous region of Portugal. It is an endangered breed; in 2026 its conservation status was listed as 'critical'. It is officially recognised as an autochthonous breed by the national Direção-Geral de Alimentação e Veterinária.

== History ==
Donkeys were introduced to the Azores – which do not have any large indigenous mammal – by Portuguese colonists in the fifteenth century; their presence there is documented in the Saudades da Terra of Gaspar Frutuoso (1522–1591). The donkey became the principal beast of burden in the Azores. It was used also for riding, but not as a draught animal. Donkeys were very numerous in the islands; in 1841 the number on São Miguel alone was estimated at 8000.

The number of donkeys on Graciosa is now severely reduced; the number remaining was reported as 26 in 2001 and as about 70 in 2008. As with the Burro de Miranda of north-eastern Portugal, male donkeys used for farm work were for preference castrated; the number of donkey geldings on the island may be a factor in the low effective population.

A process of recognition of the Burro da Ilha Graciosa as an autochthonous breed began in 2005. A breed association, the Associação de Criadores e Amigos do Burro da Ilha Graciosa, was formed in 2013. The University of the Azores oversees a programme of recovery and conservation of the remaining population; it also manages the conservation programme for the endangered Pónei da Terceira. The Burro da Graciosa is among the breeds listed in the Catálogo Oficial de Raças Autóctones Portuguesas ('official catalogue of autochthonous Portuguese breeds') published in 2021 by the Direção-Geral de Alimentação e Veterinária.

== Characteristics ==
The Burro da Ilha Graciosa is a small donkey, standing on average 105.8 cm. The coat is usually pale grey or mouse-brown in colour, but may also be bay or black; the belly, muzzle and surround of the eyes are paler. A darker dorsal stripe and shoulder-stripe are often seen, especially in pale-coloured animals; the legs may have zebra-stripes.
