= Thüringer Waldesel =

Type of donkey

Thuringian Forest Donkey
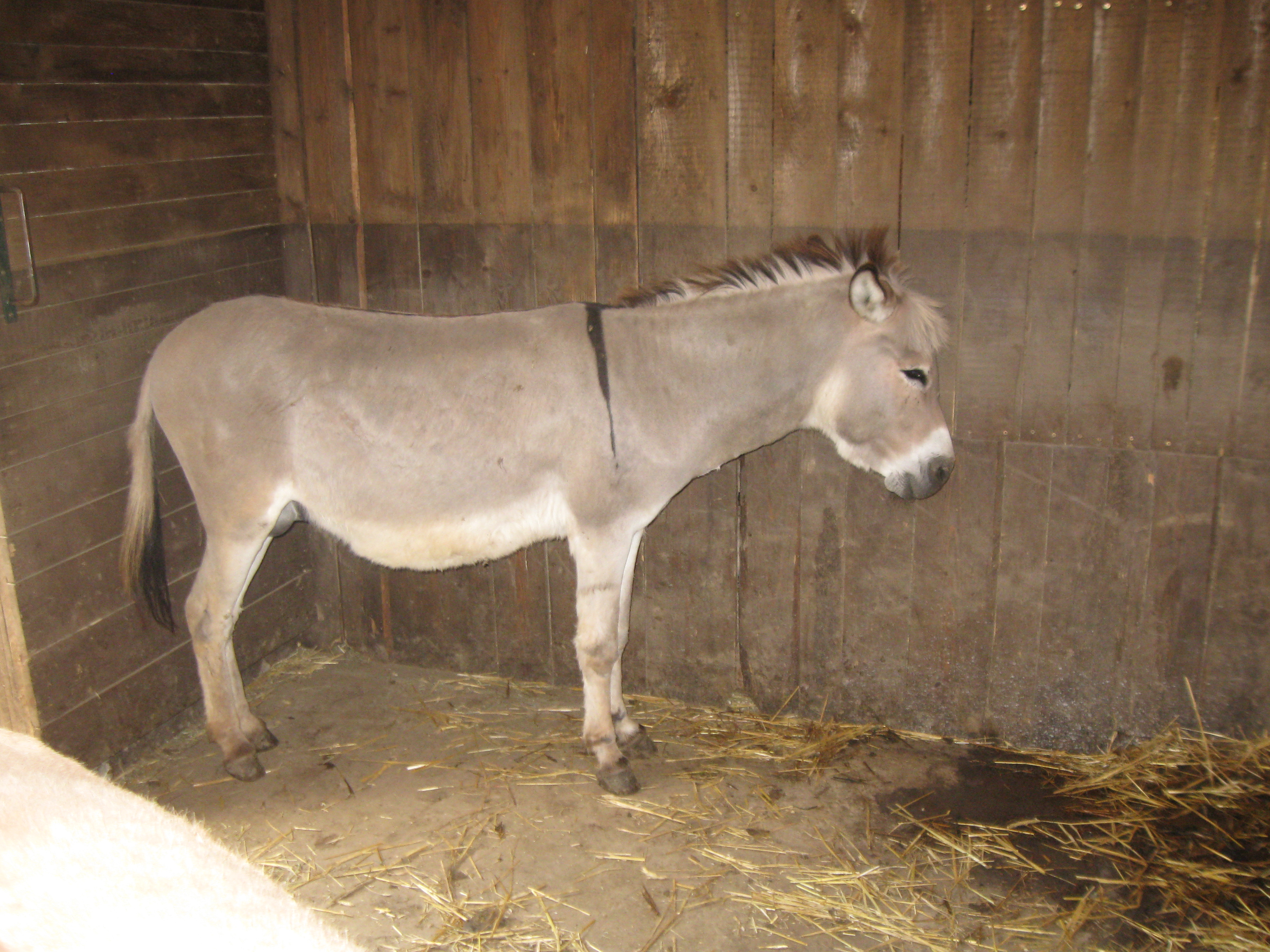
- Conservation status: DAD-IS (2021): critical
- Other names: Thuringian Forest Donkey; Mülleresel; Steinesel; Mitteldeutscher Steinesel
- Country of origin: Germany

Traits
- Weight: Male: 133–210 kg; Female: 156–185 kg
- Height: Male: 100–110 cm; Female: 95–110 cm
- Coat: stone-grey with shoulder-stripe and eel stripe

The Thüringer Waldesel or Thuringian Forest Donkey is a recently created German breed of domestic donkey.

== History ==
The Thüringer Waldesel derives from a small group of miscellaneous donkeys collected in Saxony, Saxony-Anhalt and West Thuringia, supplemented with similar-looking donkeys brought from the United Kingdom, and bred both at the Thüringer Zoopark Erfurt at Erfurt in Thuringia, and at the Wildpark Hundshaupten in Egloffstein in Bavaria. In 2019 the breeding programme was approved by the Landesbetrieb Landwirtschaft Hessen, and the Thüringer Waldesel was recognised as a breed. Seven jennies and two jacks were registered in the stud-book. As there are very few of the donkeys, the breed is reported to DAD-IS as critically endangered.

== Characteristics ==
The Thüringer Waldesel is of medium size. Jacks stand 100–110 cm at the withers, and weigh about 133–210 kg; jennies stand some 95–110 cm, and weigh 156–185 kg. The coat is usually stone-grey, with dark shoulder-stripe and eel stripe; the legs often display zebra stripes.
