= Majorera =

Spanish breed of donkey

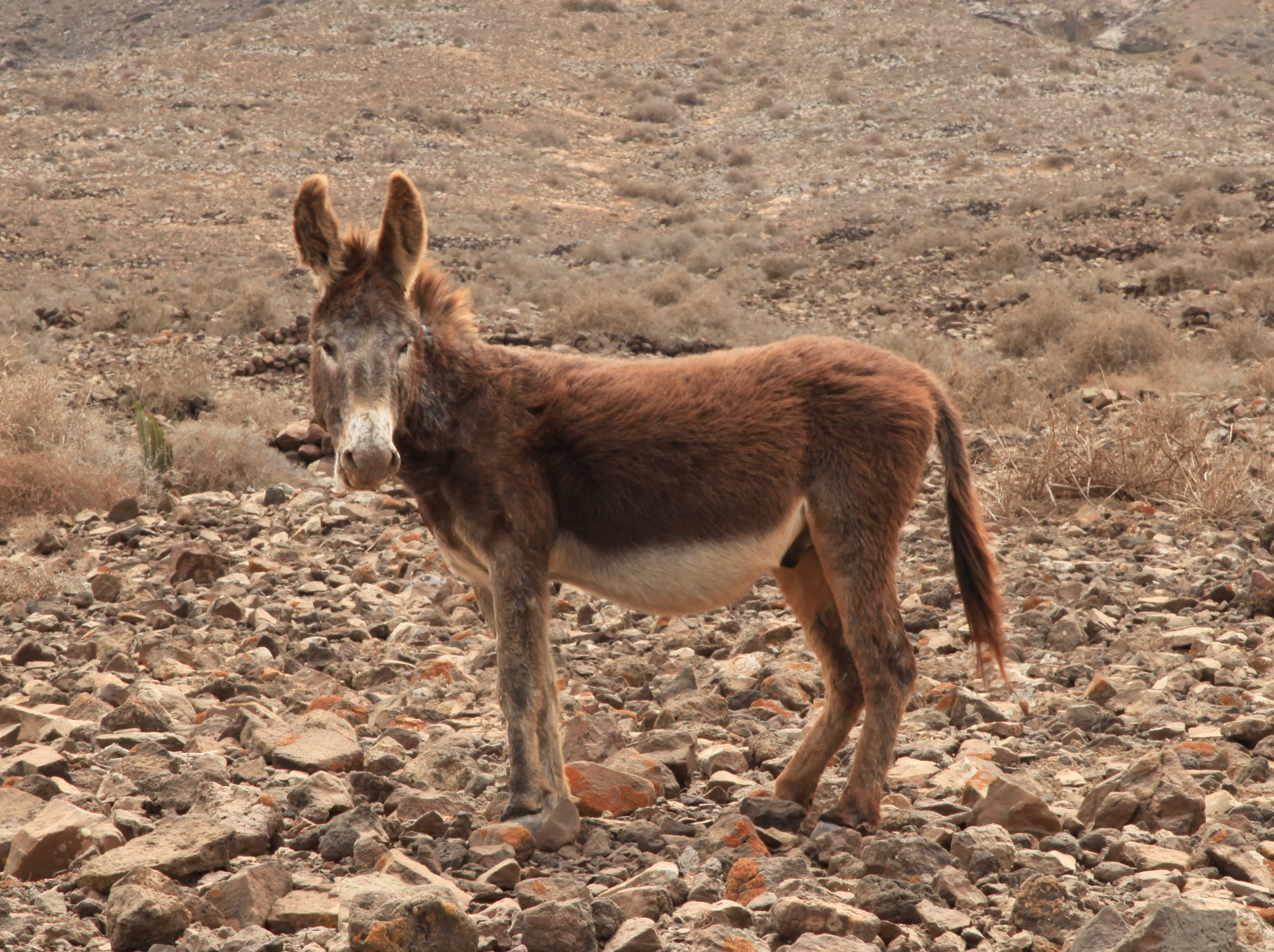
- In Pájara, Fuerteventura
- Conservation status: FAO (2007): critical; SAVE (2008): endangered
- Other names: Raza Asnal Majorera; Burro Majorero
- Country of origin: Spain
- Distribution: Fuerteventura, Canary Islands; Lanzarote, Canary Islands
- Standard: Consejería de Agricultura, Ganadería, Pesca y Aguas (in Spanish)

Traits
- Weight: Male: 175 kg; Female: 125 kg
- Height: Male: average 1.11 m; Female: average 1.09 m
- Coat: grey in all shades, or brown

The Majorera is an endangered Spanish breed of small domestic donkey indigenous to the Canary Islands, the Spanish archipelago in the Atlantic off the coast of southern Morocco. There are approximately 200 of the donkeys; almost all are on the island of Fuerteventura, with a small number on Lanzarote. The name derives from majorero, a demonym for the people of Fuerteventura. The Majorera is a small donkey of African origin, and is the only equine breed of the archipelago.

== History ==
The Majorera was introduced to the Canaries at the time of the Spanish conquest in the fifteenth century. It is present in all six municipalities of Fuerteventura – Antigua, Betancuria, La Oliva, Pájara, Puerto del Rosario and Tuineje – but particularly in Maxorata, the northern part of the island. Of the 250–300 donkeys in Gran Canaria, it is estimated that about half are of this breed, and about 50 of them are thought to be in El Hierro; a small number are on Lanzarote, and a few on the other islands.

It is well adapted to the volcanic semi-desert conditions, the high temperatures, and the low rainfall of Fuerteventura, and was used by the islanders for riding and for all kinds of agricultural work: as a pack animal, as a draught animal, and for animal traction tasks such as ploughing. As with other donkey breeds, the mechanisation of agriculture in the twentieth century led to a rapid fall in numbers. In 2009 the population was reported as 141; at the end of 2013 the total number recorded was 27.

From 1997 the Majorera was listed by the Ministerio de Agricultura, Alimentación y Medio Ambiente, the Spanish ministry of agriculture, as "under special protection, in danger of extinction". A conservation programme under the University of Barcelona was started in 2000. The conservation status of the breed was listed as "critical" by the Food and Agriculture Organization of the United Nations in 2007 and as "endangered" by the SAVE Foundation in 2008. Two associations are involved in efforts to conserve the breed: the Asociación Soo Grupo para la Conservación y Fomento del Burro Majorero in Fuerteventura and the Asociación Feria Equina La Culata in Gran Canaria; in 2019 there were 29 jacks and 112 jennies recorded in the herd-book.

== Characteristics ==
The Majorera is a small donkey of African type. It usually grey, ranging from pale to dark grey, and may also be brown. It has primitive markings: a darker dorsal stripe and shoulder-stripe, and zebra-striping on the legs. It stands some 1.00–1.20 m at the withers, and weighs about 125–175 kg.
