= Irish donkey =

Breed of donkey

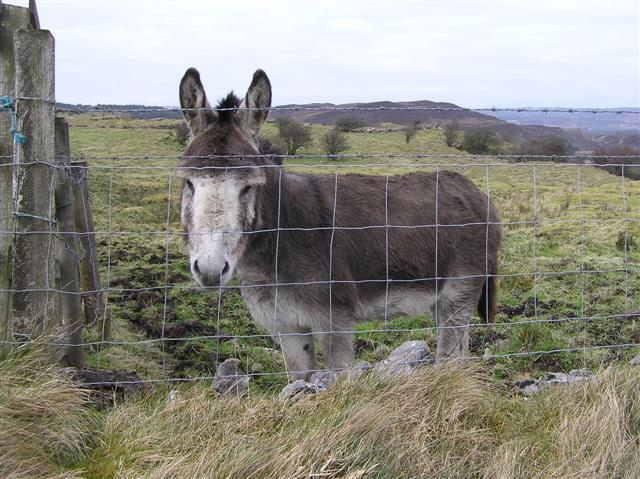
- Country of origin: Ireland

Traits
- Coat: grey, black, brown, white, pinto

The Irish donkey (Irish: asal Éireannach) is a medium-sized breed of donkey native to Ireland. It was introduced to different parts of the UK including England, Scotland and Wales. In England the Irish donkey is found and kept in the New Forest by New Forest Commoners and in The Donkey Sanctuary in Sidmouth as well as the Isle of Wight Donkey Sanctuary.
