= Catalan donkey =

Spanish breed of donkey

Catalan
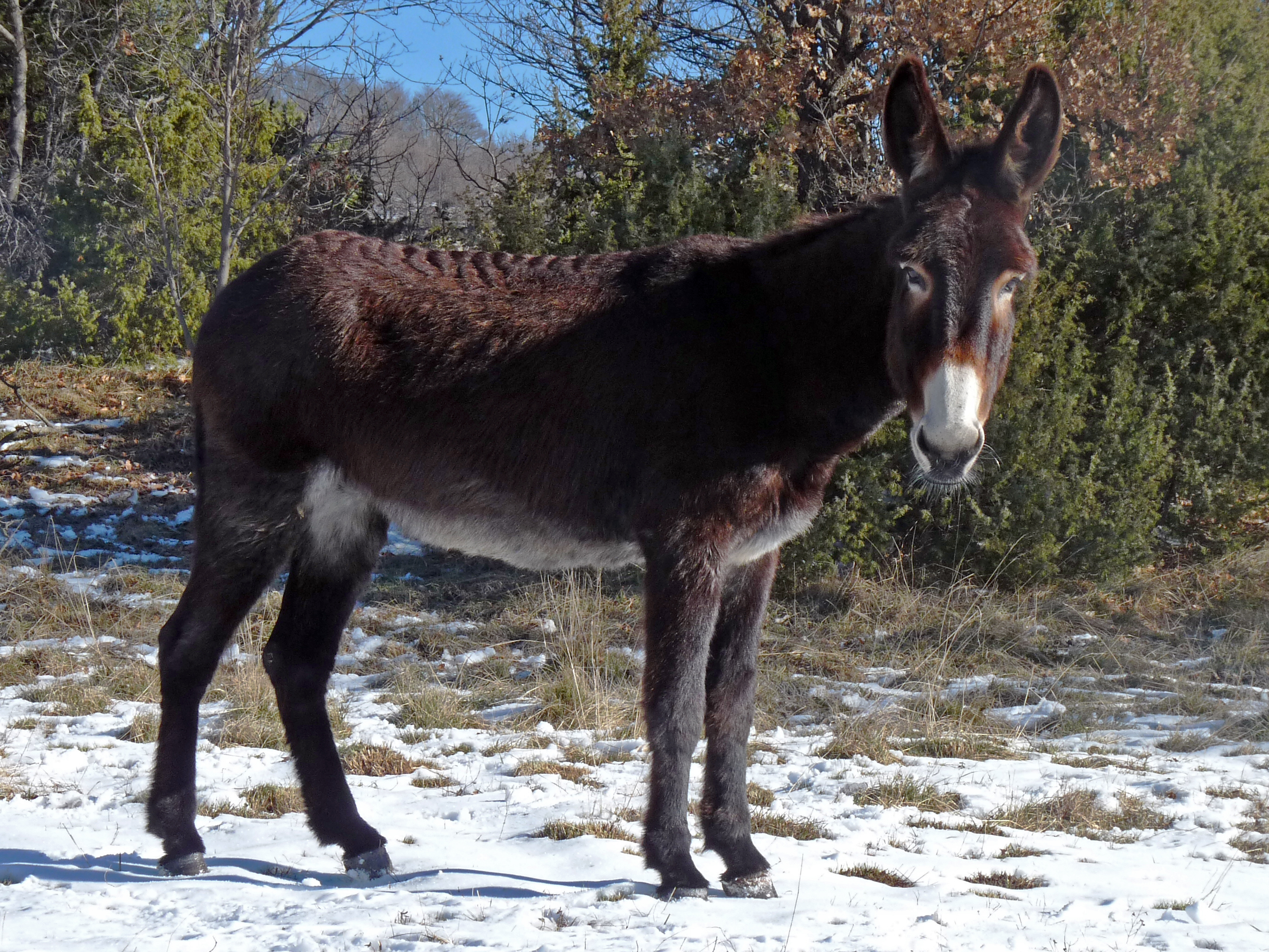
- A jenny

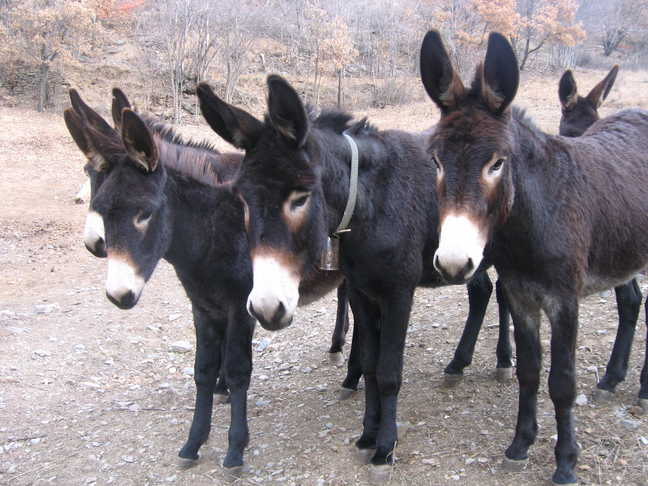
- Conservation status: FAO (2007): endangered-maintained; DAD-IS (2020): at risk
- Other names: Catalana; Ruc Català; Ase Català; Asno Catalán; Raza Asinia Catalana; Raza Ausetana; Garañón de Vic; Guarà Català; Guarà de Vic
- Country of origin: Spain, France
- Distribution: Catalonia, Spain; Roussillon, France
- Standard: MAPA (in Spanish)

Traits
- Weight: 350–450 kg (800–1000 lb)
- Height: Male: 145–160 cm (57–63 in); Female: 135–150 cm (53–59 in)

The Catalan (Catalan: Ase Català or Ruc Català, (Note: Catalan pronunciation: [ˈruk kətəˈla]) Spanish: Asno Catalán) is a breed of large domestic donkey from the historic region of Catalonia, now in north-eastern Spain and south-western France. Approximately 80% of the breed population is in the modern autonomous community of Catalonia, and approximately 20% is in the historic Roussillon region of France.

== History ==
The Catalan breed is considered to be very old; Pliny the Elder mentions donkeys on the Plain of Vic, in the comarca of Osona. Some believe it to be related to the Mallorquín and the Zamorano-Leonés donkey.

It originates in the basins of the Cardener, Segre and Ter rivers. A herd-book was established in 1880 or 1929. Numbers fell during the Spanish Civil War, but recovered in the next decade. In the 1960s and 1970s rural depopulation and the mechanisation of agriculture led to a new decline in numbers. A breeders' association, the Associació pel Foment de la Raça Asinina Catalana, was formed in 1978 and the 1929 herd-book was re-opened. Much of the credit for the recovery of the breed is given to one person, Joan Gassó i Salvans from the comarca of Berguedà. In 2004, 32% of the registered population of 336 were on his finca in Olvan. An official national genealogical herd-book was opened in 2002. At the end of 2013 the total population in Spain was recorded as 851; by 2024 this number had risen to 961, of which about 350 were in the hands of members of the breed association, the Associació pel Foment de la Raça Asina Catalana. In 2020 the Ministerio de Agricultura, Alimentación y Medio Ambiente, the Spanish ministry of agriculture, listed the breed as "in danger of extinction".

The Catalan has been exported to many countries, among them Algeria, Congo, Madagascar, Tunisia and Zaire in Africa; Argentina, Brazil, Canada, Cuba and the United States in the Americas; and also Australia, Germany, India and the United Kingdom. It contributed to the history of European breeds including the Baudet de Poitou in France, and the Asino di Martina Franca and Asino di Pantelleria in Italy. In the United States it played an essential part in the development of the American Mammoth Jack: a Catalan jack known as Imported Mammoth, brought to Charleston in South Carolina in 1819, was widely used for breeding in parts of Kentucky, Missouri and Tennessee.

== Characteristics ==
The Catalan is a large donkey, and generally weighs between 350–450 kg. Height at the withers is some 145–160 cm for jacks, about 10 cm less for jennies.

== Use ==
The traditional use of the Catalan was as a sire for mules. With the mechanisation of agriculture in the twentieth century, demand for mules fell precipitously, and Catalan jacks were no longer needed for this purpose. In the twenty-first century, possible uses for these donkeys include recreational tourism; use in vegetation management to clear underbrush in woodland, thus reducing the risk of fire; as a companion animal; and as an element of cultural heritage. Advocates of Catalan nationalism have adopted the donkey as a satirical response to the Toro de Osborne image widespread in other parts of Spain.
