= Sardinian donkey =

Italian breed of donkey

Sardinian
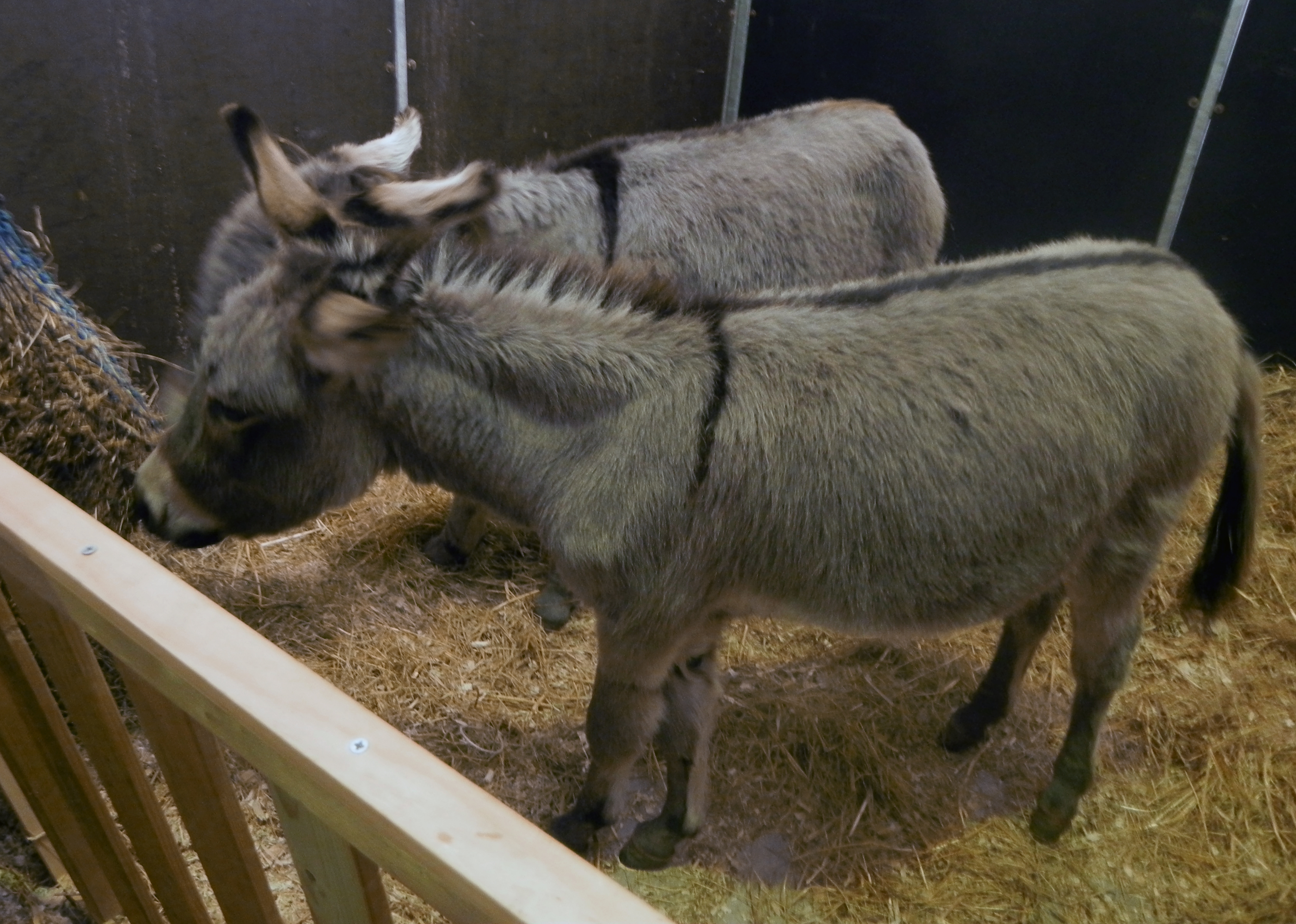
- At Fieracavalli in Verona, 2014
- Conservation status: FAO (2007): endangered; DAD-IS (2022): at risk/endangered
- Other names: Asino Sardo; Molente; Molenti; Àinu; Burriccu; Poleddu; Coccineddu; Incherci; Incónchinu; Molinzanu; Pegus de Mola
- Country of origin: Italy
- Distribution: Sardinia; mainland Italy
- Standard: MIPAAF
- Use: transport; burden; draught; animal power (flour milling)

Traits
- Height: 80–110 cm

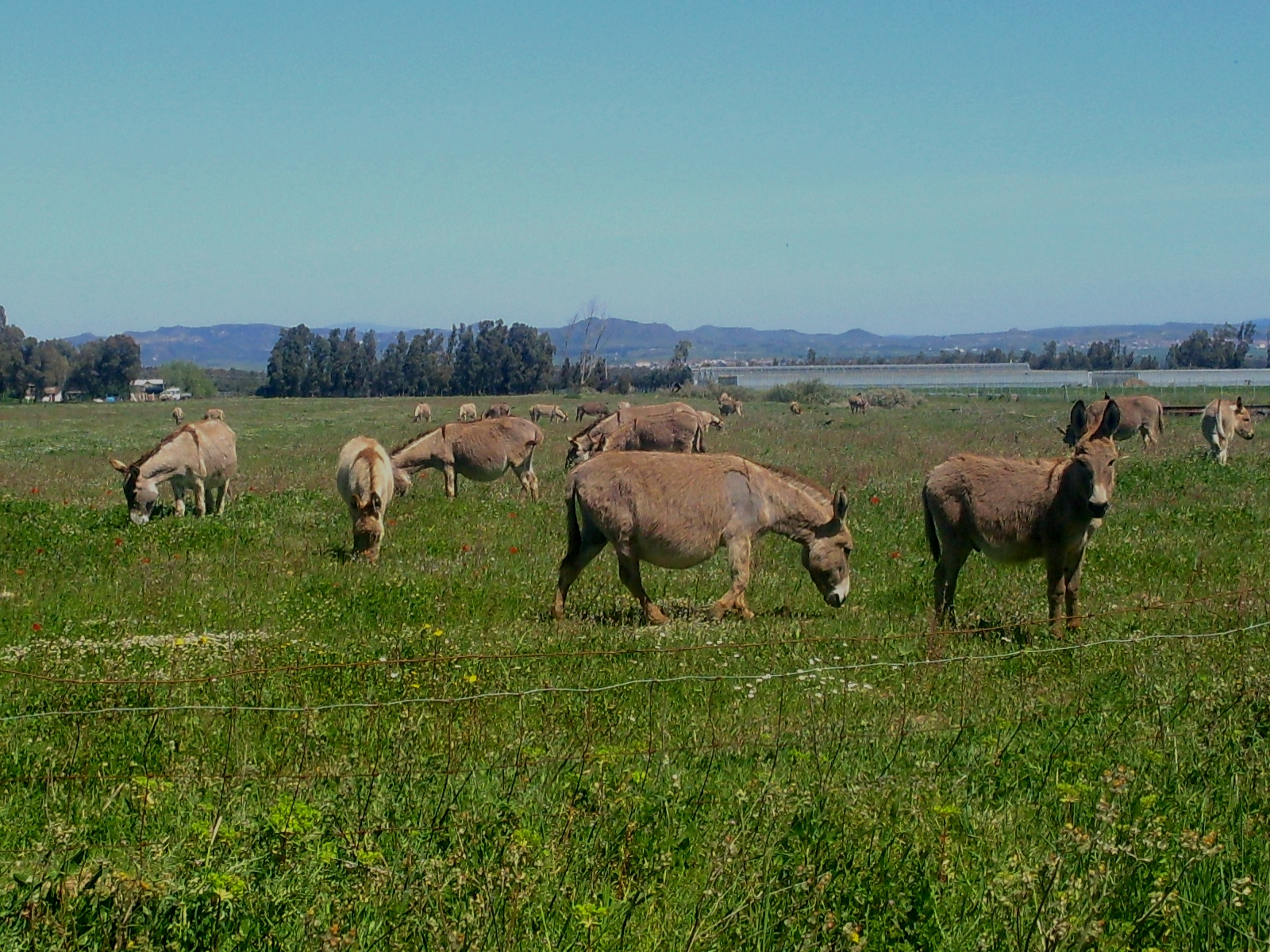
At pasture in Sardinia

The Sardinian (Italian: Asino Sardo, Sardinian: Molente or Molenti) is an Italian breed of donkey from the Mediterranean island of Sardinia, to the west of Italy. It is raised throughout the island; there are also some small populations in mainland Italy. It is one of the eight autochthonous donkey breeds of limited distribution recognised by the Ministero delle Politiche Agricole Alimentari e Forestali, the Italian ministry of agriculture and forestry. Its conservation status was listed as 'endangered' by the Food and Agriculture Organization of the United Nations in 2007 and as 'at risk/endangered' in DAD-IS in 2024. The breeding population reported for 2022 numbered just over 3600 head, with 2094 jennies and 963 jacks in 788 herds.
