= Zamorano-Leonés =

Spanish breed of donkey

- A jack

- Yoked pair
- Conservation status: FAO (2007): endangered; SAVE (2008): stable
- Other names: Carbajalina; Leonesa; Zamorana; Garañón Leonés; Asno zamorano-leonés
- Country of origin: Spain
- Distribution: Province of Zamora, Province of León, Castilla y León
- Standard: Comunidad de Castilla y León (in Spanish)

Traits
- Weight: Male: 300–370 kg; Female: 270–360 kg
- Height: Male: 145 cm; Female: 135 cm
- Coat: black or dark bay

The Zamorano-Leonés is a Spanish breed of large domestic donkey from the provinces of Zamora and León, in the autonomous community of Castilla y León in north-western Spain. The name derives from those of the two provinces.

== History ==
Donkeys in the province of Zamora date back to at least the fifteenth century. The Zamorano donkey was exported to the New World, and was the first Spanish donkey to contribute to the evolution of the North American donkey. From the eighteenth century it appears also to have influenced the development of the French Baudet du Poitou breed.

The Zamorano-Leonés received official recognition in 1940, but the genealogical herd-book was not opened until 1998. As with other donkey breeds, the mechanisation of agriculture in the twentieth century led to a decline in numbers and a loss of genetic identity, until only a few breeders continued to raise pure-bred stock. From 1980 the breed was listed by the Ministerio de Agricultura, the Spanish ministry of agriculture, among those enjoying "special protection"; in 1997 it was reclassified as "in danger of extinction". In 2007 its conservation status was listed as "endangered" by the FAO.

A breeders' association, the Asociación Nacional de Criadores de Ganado Selecto de Raza Zamorana-Leonesa, was formed in 1995. At the end of 2013 the registered population was 1292 head, of which about 90% were in Castilla y León.

== Characteristics ==
The Zamorano-Leonés is a large donkey, with a massive head – the breed standard speaks of "manifest acromegaly". Jacks stand on average 145 cm, and weigh about 370 kg. The coat is long and shaggy, black or dark bay in colour; the belly, muzzle and surround of the eyes are pale-coloured.

== Use ==
The donkeys were formerly kept as working animals, both for animal traction and as pack animals; jacks were in the past used mainly for the production of large mules for agricultural work.
