= Pantesco =

Italian breed of donkey

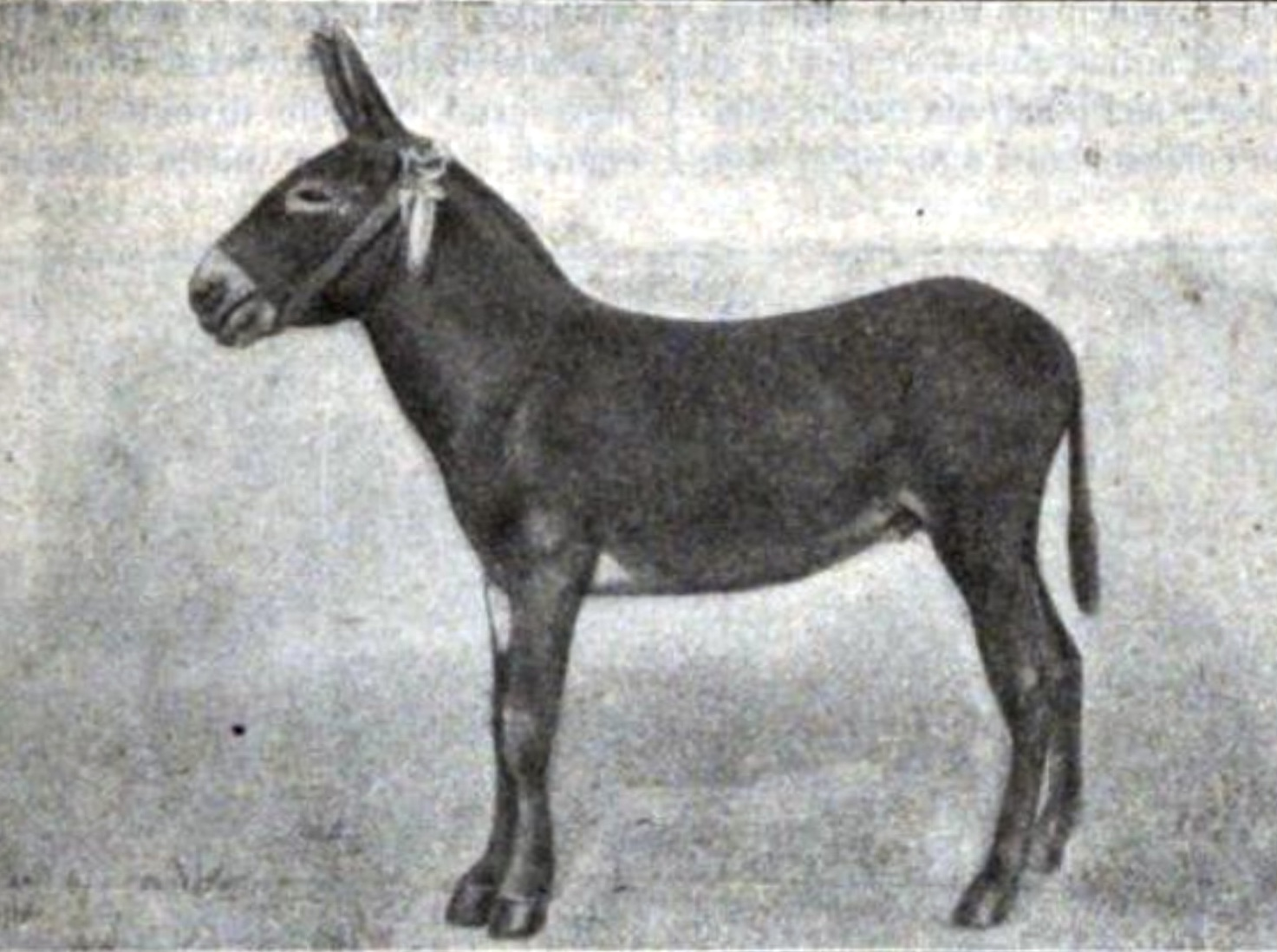
- Photograph from 1925
- Conservation status: FAO (2007): critical; DAD-IS (2025): at risk/critical
- Other names: Asino di Pantelleria
- Country of origin: Italy
- Distribution: Pantelleria; Sicily
- Standard: MIPAAF

Traits
- Height: 125–140 cm

The Pantesco or Asino di Pantelleria is an Italian breed of donkey from the Mediterranean island of Pantelleria, south-west of Sicily. It is at high risk of extinction; its conservation status was listed as "critical" in 2007. It is one of the eight autochthonous donkey breeds of limited distribution recognised by the Ministero delle Politiche Agricole Alimentari e Forestali, the Italian ministry of agriculture and forestry.

== History ==
The Pantesco originates in – and is named for – the island of Pantelleria, which lies to the south-west of Sicily, though closer to the North African coast. Its ancestry may include animals from both Sicily and Africa, as well as stock brought to the island during the five hundred years of Arab rule. It was in the past used by the people of the island both as a beast of burden and as a riding animal; jacks from the island were much in demand for siring mules, and were exported both to Sicily and to various parts of the Maghreb.

In the early twentieth century the population of the donkeys on the island was not large, numbering barely 1000 head. It was further much reduced by the events of the Second World War, particularly the devastation wrought by Allied forces in 1943; a census in 1951 found about 180 donkeys in all, many of them showing little resemblance to the original type. With the crisis in donkey-breeding brought about by the mechanisation of agriculture in the post-War years, numbers fell still further; with the death of the last pure-bred jack in the 1980s, the Pantesco was close to extinction.

A recovery project was launched in 1989 by the Azienda Forestale Demaniale della Regione Sicilia – the forestry administration of Sicily – with the participation of the Istituto Zooprofilattico Sperimentale and the faculty of veterinary medicine of the University of Milan. A search was conducted throughout the island of Sicily for donkeys with significant Pantesco ancestry; nine such animals – three jacks and six jennies, with a percentage of Pantesco blood ranging from 80% to 90% – were identified, moved to the Demanio San Matteo, a state-owned woodland on the slopes of Monte Erice, and were bred together to re-establish the breed. A secondary conservation herd was established in the Riserva naturale dello Zingaro, on the eastern coast of Capo San Vito.

The conservation status of the breed was listed as "critical" by the Food and Agriculture Organization of the United Nations in 2007; in 2025 it was listed in DAD-IS as "at risk/critical". Between 2008 and 2023 the reported population remained in the range 64–88 head.

== Characteristics ==
The Pantesco usually stands between 125 and 140 cm at the withers. The coat is short, smooth and fine – markedly different from the rough woolly coat of most other donkeys – and may be dark bay or black-brown, with white muzzle, eye-surrounds, belly and insides of the thighs. It can reach a speed of about 25 km/h, and is also capable of moving in a lateral ambling gait similar to the tölt of the Icelandic Horse – a most unusual trait in donkeys.

== Use ==
The Pantesco was traditionally used principally as a beast of burden capable of carrying a heavy load over almost any terrain, but also as a riding animal and for donkey racing. Jacks were used to sire mules.
