= Maltese donkey =

Breed of donkey

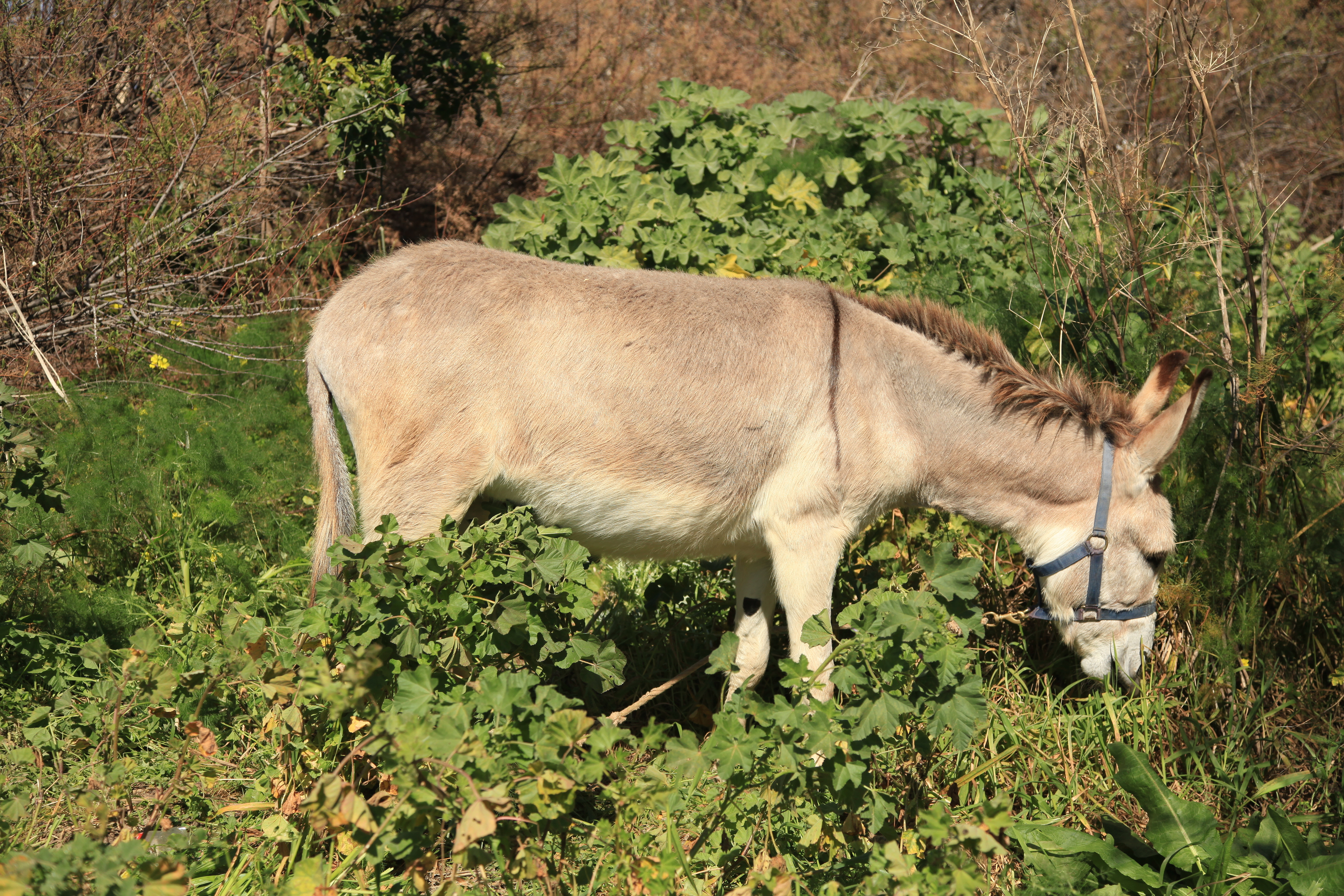
- Conservation status: Critically Endangered
- Other names: Ħmar Malti
- Country of origin: Malta
- Distribution: Malta

Traits
- Height: Male: 150 cm; Female: 143 cm
- Coat: short, glossy, color can be black, brown, or reddish-brown

Classification

The Maltese donkey also known as Ħmar Malti is a breed of donkey originated in Malta. It used to be used as a beast of burden. It is a relatively small breed of donkey with a compact body. It is considered as a part of cultural heritage of Malta, it has played its role in Malta's history in transportation and even used for entertainment for celebrations during Christmas. It was also imported to United States on the request of President George Washington, where it was used to breed the American mammoth donkey which changed the farming landscape of Southern states. Currently, there are only about 50 Maltese donkeys remaining.
