= Balearic donkey =

Breed of domestic donkey from the Balearic Islands

Balearic
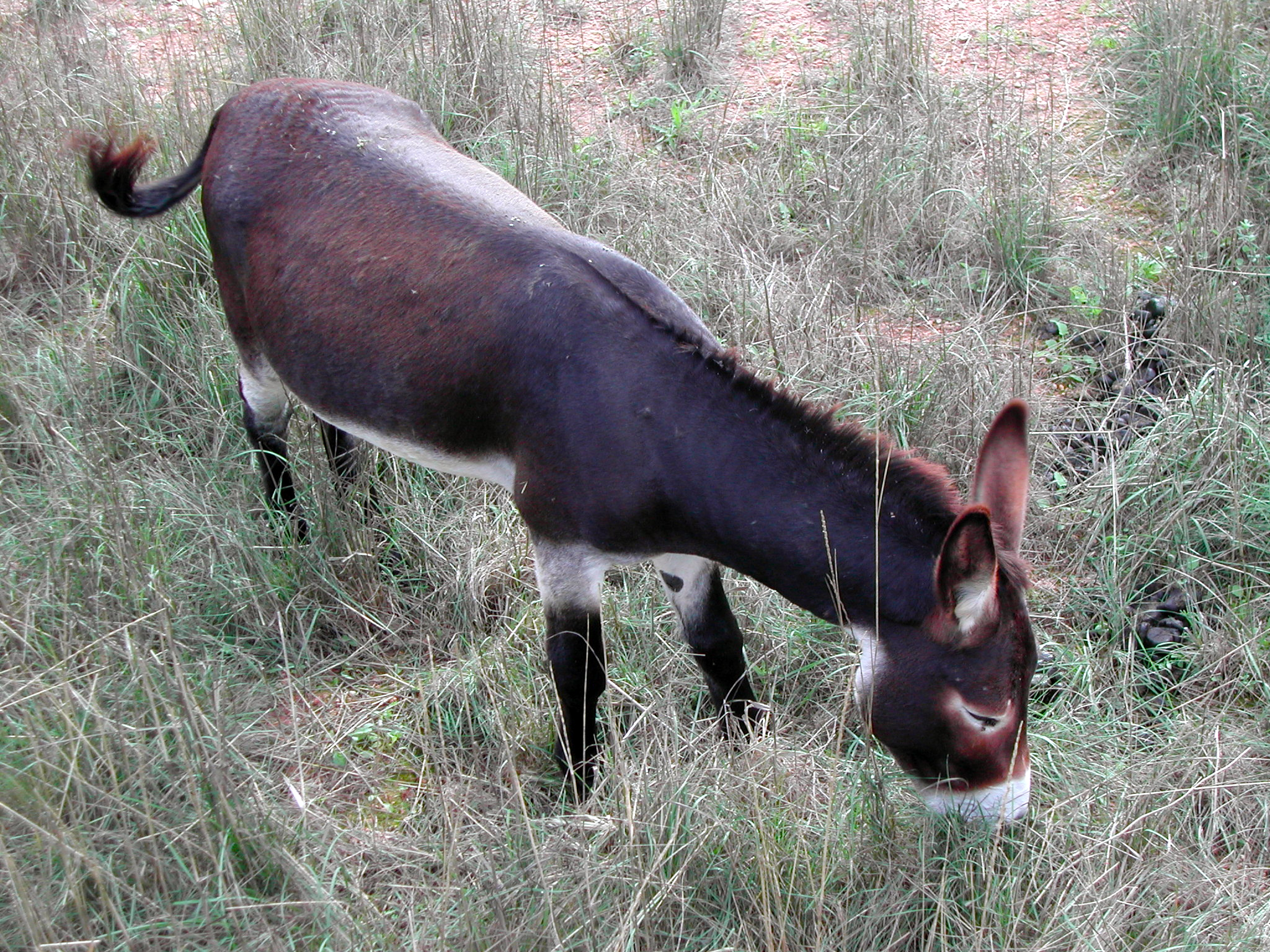
- Conservation status: FAO (2007): critical; SAVE (2008): endangered
- Other names: Catalan: Ase Balear; Catalan: Ase MallorquÍ; Catalan: Ase Menorquí; Catalan: Raça Asenca Balear; Catalan: Raça Asenca Mallorquina; Spanish: Asno Balear; Spanish: Asno Mallorquín; Spanish: Burro Mallorquín; Mallorquín
- Country of origin: Spain
- Distribution: Balearic Islands
- Standard: Govern de les Illes Balears (pages 10–13, in Catalan)

Traits
- Weight: Male: 357 kg; Female: 309 kg
- Height: Male: minimum 1.40 m average 1.43 m; Female: minimum 1.30 m average 1.35 m
- Coat: black or near black

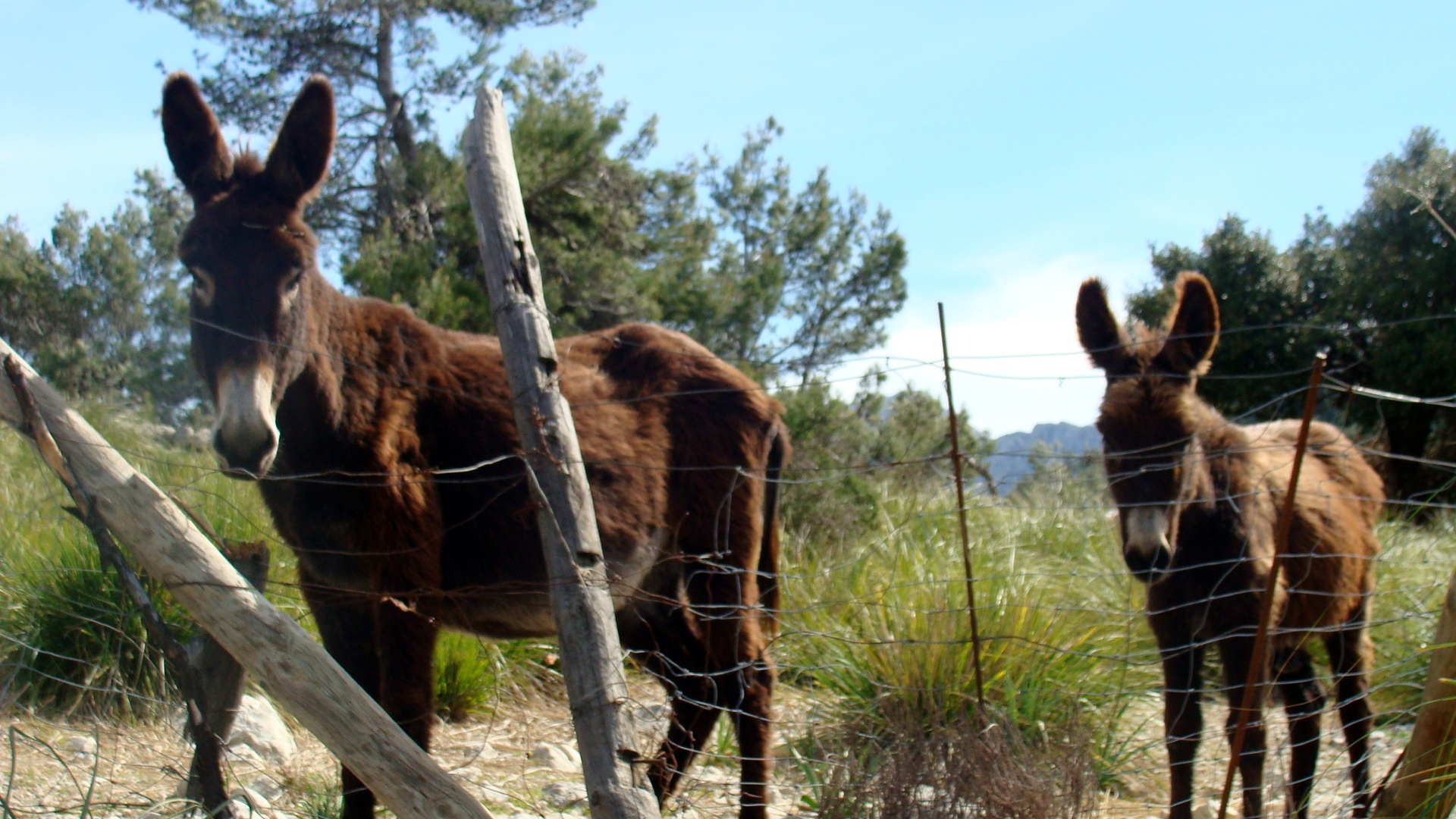
In Mallorca

The Balearic, Catalan: Ase Balear, Spanish: Asno Balear, is a Spanish breed of domestic donkey indigenous to the autonomous community of the Balearic Islands, in the Mediterranean off the eastern coast of Spain. It is found mainly in Mallorca, the largest island of the group, and also in Menorca, where it was much used for mule-breeding; it is no longer present in the islands of Eivissa and Formentera. Since 2006 it has been officially called the Raça Asenca Balear; it was previously known as the Raça Asenca Mallorquina, and was also referred to as the Ase MallorquÍ, Asno Mallorquín or Mallorquín.

== History ==
The Balearic shares common origins with the Catalan and the Baudet du Poitou. The donkey was in the past the most highly valued animal in Mallorca, and could be sold for very high prices. In the early twentieth century it was prized outside the islands too, and many were exported to England, and later to the United States. The breed population fell rapidly in the first half of that century, and it came close to disappearing; the number of pure-bred animals is now stable.

A herd book was established for the Mallorquín donkey, as it was then known, in 1990. A breeders' association, now called the Associació de Criadors de Pura Raça Asenca de les Illes Balears, was formed. In 2002 the breed was officially recognised, and a genealogical stud book was established. From 1997 the Balearic donkey was listed by the Ministerio de Agricultura, Alimentación y Medio Ambiente, the Spanish ministry of agriculture, as "under special protection, in danger of extinction". In 2006, at the request of the breeders' association, the name of the breed was changed to "Raça Asenca Balear". Its conservation status was listed as "critical" by the Food and Agriculture Organization of the United Nations in 2007 and as "endangered" by the SAVE Foundation in 2008.

At the end of 2013 the total number recorded in the stud book was 464, all of which were in the Balearic Islands.

== Characteristics ==
The Balearic is similar to the Catalan, but smaller and with lighter bone. Jacks stand about 1.45 metres at the withers and weigh about 360 kilograms, while jennies stand about 1.35 m and weigh about 330 kg. The coat is black or nearly black in colour, shading to pale on the belly, muzzle and surround of the eyes.

== Use ==
Before the mechanisation of agriculture, Balearic jennies were used in all kinds of agricultural work, both for burden, carrying sacks of olives and the like, and for draught, pulling small carts; jacks were used to sire mules.
