= Burro de Miranda =

Portuguese breed of donkey

Miranda donkey
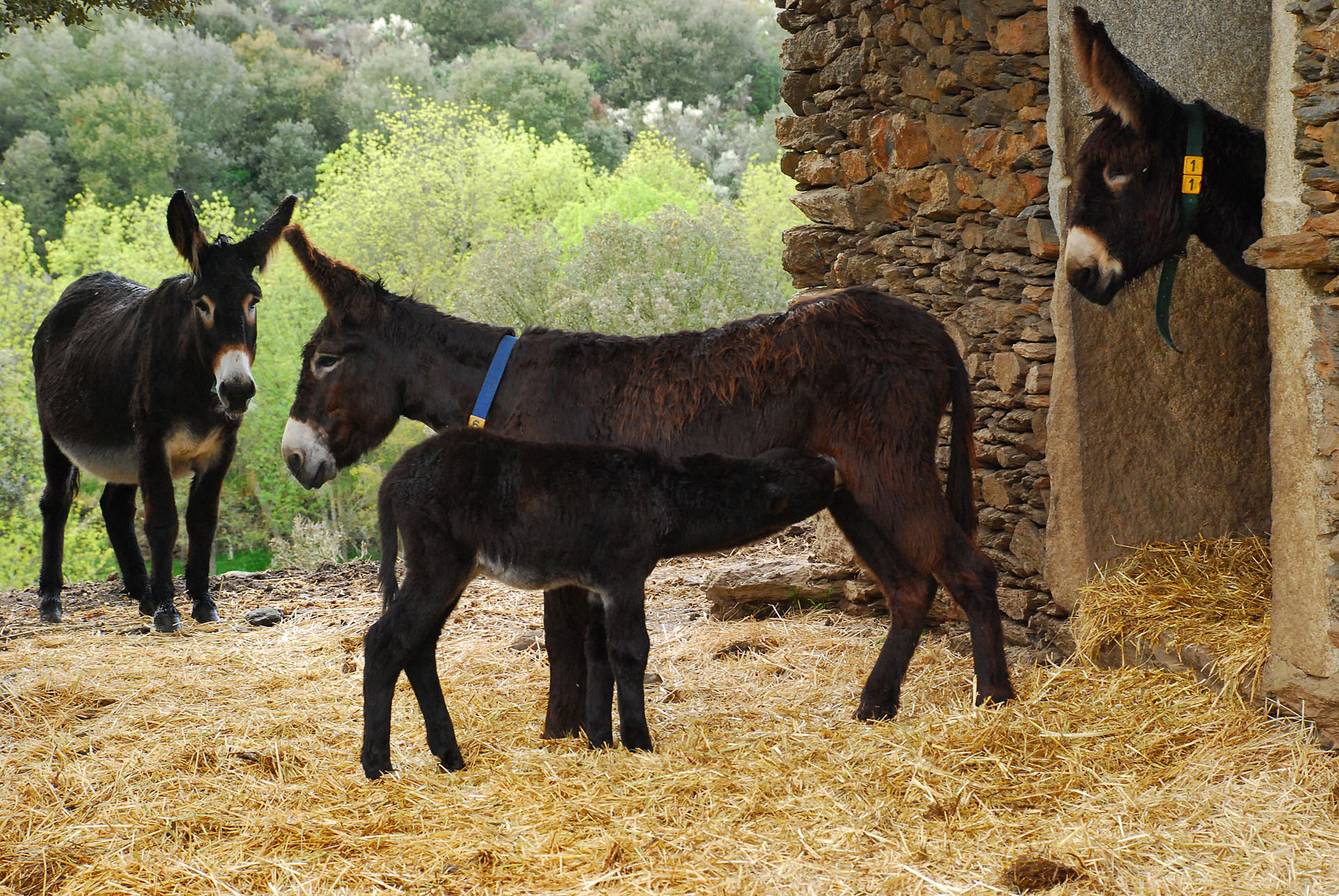
- Other names: Burro de Miranda; Burro do Planalto Mirandês; Mirandês; Raça asinina de Miranda; Transmontano
- Country of origin: Portugal
- Distribution: Terra de Miranda

The Burro de Miranda (Note: Portuguese pronunciation: [ˈbu.ʁu ˈdɨ miˈɾɐ̃.dɐ], Mirandese pronunciation: [ˈbu.rʊ ˈdə miˈɾã.da]) is a Portuguese breed of donkey indigenous to the Terra de Miranda region of north-eastern Portugal.

== Appearance ==
The Miranda donkey is born with coat that appears black, but will shed out to become brown. It is tall, 1.2–1.35 metres (3 ft 11 in – 4 ft 5 in) at the withers, has long hairy ears, large hooves, pangare markings around its eyes, muzzle and underline, broad forehead, small eyes with projecting orbital arcades, large and strong legs, heavy neck, unobtrusive withers, short and muscular back, and a powerful chest. Miranda donkeys are distinguished from common donkeys by longer hair, and they are considered more social and docile. The development of the breed's characteristics reflects the region where they developed: isolated environmental conditions, agricultural characteristics of the soil, weather that tends to extremes and socioeconomic standards in the region. In 2001 the Miranda donkey was recognized as a distinct breed by the Portuguese Department of Agriculture, and, it was the first donkey breed in Portugal to join the group of asinine indigenous breeds protected by the European Union. It is the only officially recognized donkey breed on Portugal.

== Relationships with humans ==
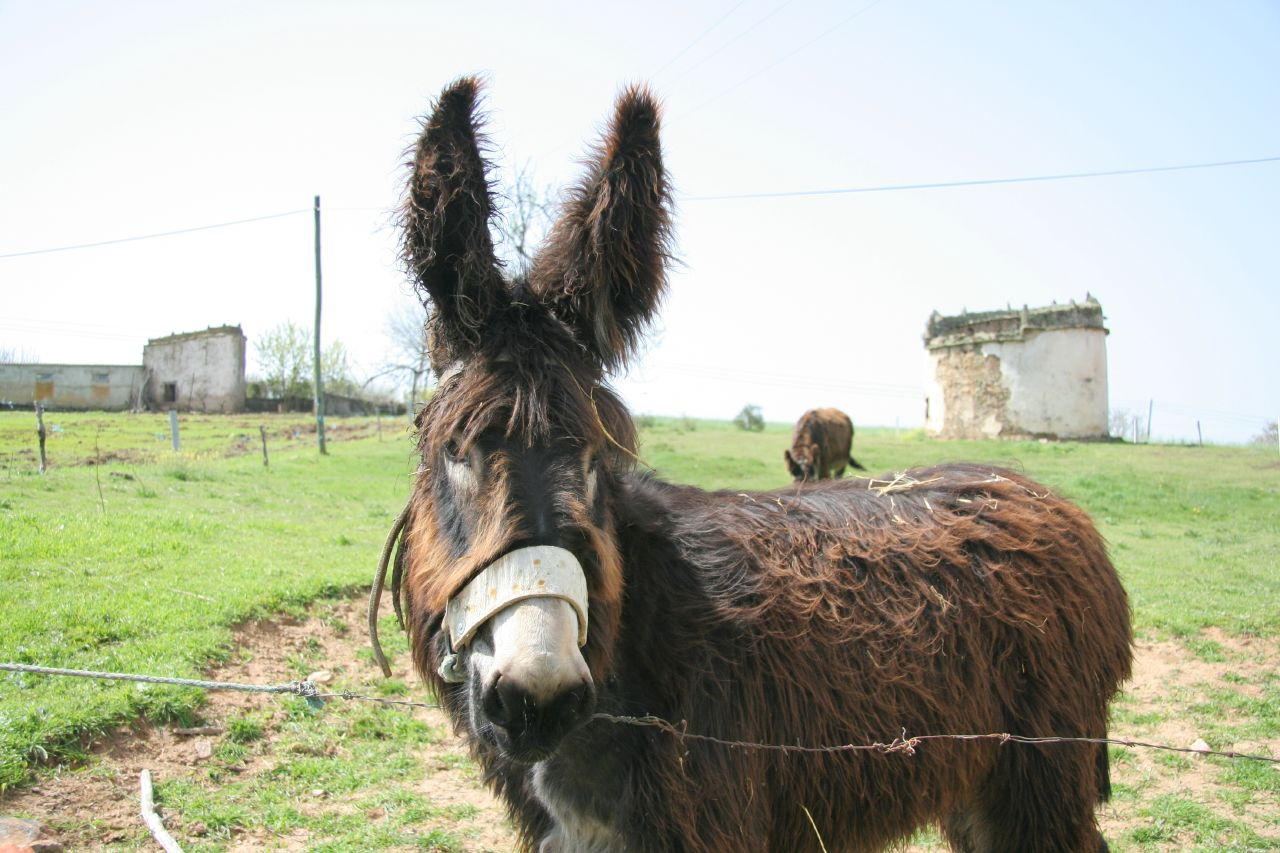
Young Miranda donkey before fully shedding coat

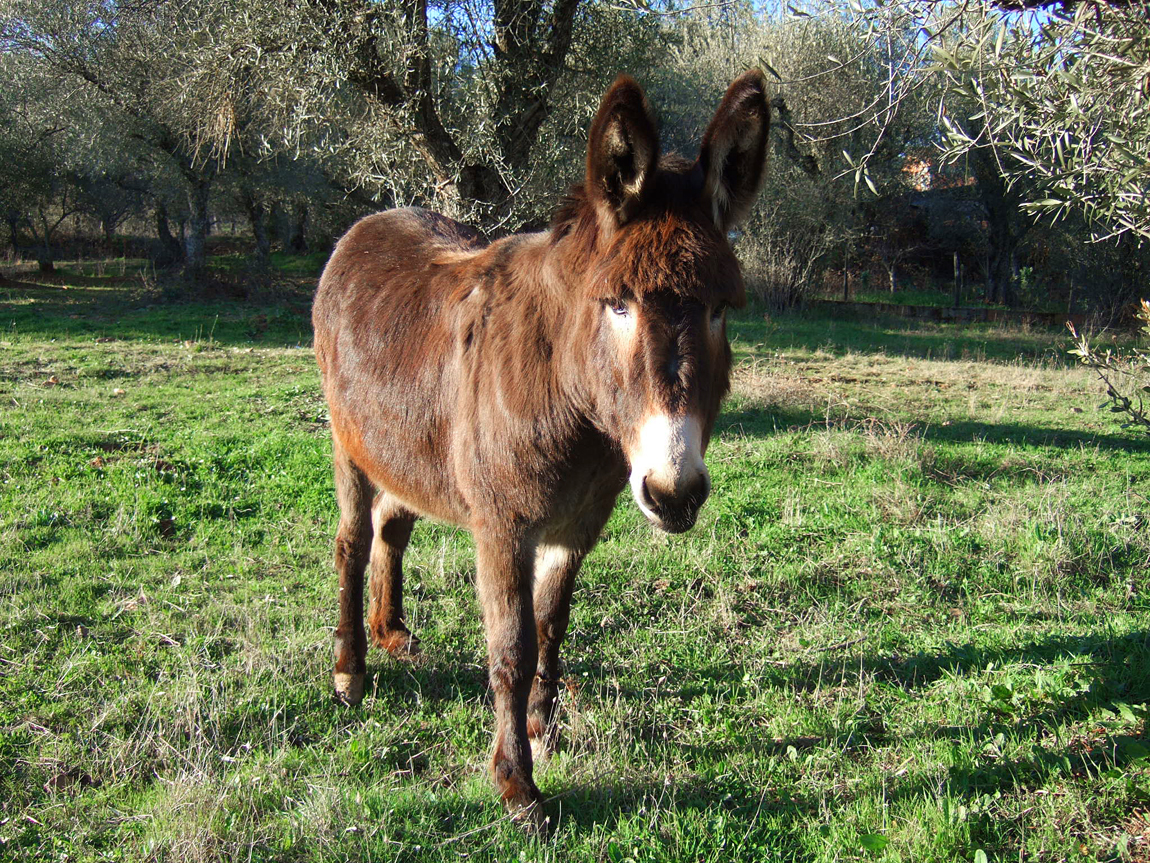
Burro mirandês

For centuries the Miranda donkeys were a mainstay of agriculture in the Terra de Miranda region of Portugal, helping farmers plow and carrying goods. Descended from the African wild ass, donkeys originated in deserts with little fodder and difficult ground. Those attributes made the Miranda donkey ideally suited for Portugal's highlands. The donkey was at the center of Mirandesa society; major trade fairs, called feiras de burros, were centered around it. Made largely superfluous by mechanization and the end of exploitation of small parcels, they are no longer profitable as work animals, and now are little more than companion animals for the elderly. It is estimated that only 300 Miranda donkeys are now used as farm animals. The majority are now cared for by older farmers, who are then eligible for E.U. subsidies but it is said that the farmers "keep the donkeys more for love than for subsidies". For preservation it is problematic that almost only old people keep this breed. Ninety percent of Miranda owners are over 75 years of age; extinction of owners is felt to be a main risk for extinction for the animals. The Miranda Plateau is said to represents the decay of the country’s countryside: agriculture is a very difficult and unprofitable business; the young go to the cities and leaving only some of the old behind. The villages have been depopulated.

The majority of the donkeys are well-cared for, many owners viewing the animals as part of their family. Even with subsidies, they are not profitable, though the payments persuade more farmers to keep the burros despite their dwindling worth. At a cost of US$650/year and only a US$230 E.U subsidy, it makes little economic sense to keep a donkey. When the animal can no longer work, or be supported by the farmer, they generally end up being sold for slaughter; few are given free to shelters. Before roads were paved and dams were built in the 1960s, owners pushed unwanted animals off the cliff over the River Douro, "their bones to be picked clean by vultures". Since 2003, they have been listed as an endangered breed. The number of animals has stabilized at around 800, a quarter of the number in the 1970s, as conservationists have taken an active role in preserving the breed. Despite its central role in traditional Portuguese rural life, they were previously looked at as little more than agricultural tools, neglected over the centuries and felt to be poor relatives among the equidae. It reputation as the "stupid animal of the poor" has not helped. With the efforts of the conservationists, this view is changing, and now, after decades of neglect, they are felt to symbolically represent a fading rural cultural tradition.

In the era of austerity the donkeys are front and center in the debate about how far the E.U. should go to subsidize non-profitable agricultural regions. The fear is that in the near future support will be withdrawn from the donkeys. The donkey has been used as a metaphor for Portugal, shunted aside by industrial society and existing only on E.U. subsidies. There is criticism of the subsidies, as they are felt to dampen the enthusiasm for innovation and modernization. A socialist mayor in the region opined that “the honest answer is that subsidies bring nothing”.

In the past the Miranda donkey was known as the "poor's motor", a docile and safe companion of the rural farmers, its "arms and legs", its entertainment and the one keeping them active and useful. But, the move to modernity made the Miranda donkey redundant; in adapting to the changed rural socioeconomic landscape, new uses have had to be found for the Miranda donkey to save it from biological extinction. This is the aim of the preservationists, to keep alive an indigenous breed in order to save a genetic, ecological and cultural heritage unique to Portugal. To commemorate its outdated usage as a mechanism of travel for gaita-de fole players, a festival is held every July. 20 animals are trekked through two chosen villages accompanied by the bagpipe players and a four day celebration of food, drink and music.

In 2015 researchers at the University of Trás-os-Montes and Alto Douro concluded the Miranda donkey was in danger of extinction over the next 50 years. The major factor was the abandonment of breeding the animal; out of an aging breeding population of 600 animals only 1/2 of the females had foals, and some had only one. Other factors include a high mortality rate among young foals, and a growing tendency of farmers to resort to hybridization and crossings with different breeds.

=== Modern uses of the donkey ===
The use of the donkey as an eco-tourism resource is emerging in Portugal. Tourist donkey trail riding tours are popular, particularly beneficial for those who could not otherwise negotiate difficult terrain. The re-emergence of fairs, festivals, donkey racing and shows invigorates old local traditions and customs, with the donkey as the tool for education and awareness. This knowledge enhances a tourism targeted to environmental awareness and cultural respect.

Arguably less positive for the well-being of the donkey and threatening their "symbolic and cultural worth" is the use of the animal for industrial donkey milk production. In a strongly worded statement, this has been opposed by conservationists. The milk is used for expensive soaps, skin creams, and cheeses. As the Miranda's milk is closest to human milk in the animal world, its nutritional value has suggested it may be a substitute for children with intolerance for cow's milk.

Asinoterapia, a branch of animal therapy, uses the donkey as a co-therapist, taking advantage of its natural docility, patience, attentiveness and intelligence. It was developed in the 1970s in several countries and has been recently introduced into Portugal, where its use is increasing. This therapy is particularly effective for children with disabilities, providing them with sensory enrichment and helping with their biological and social development; it is also effective for emotional disorders such as anxiety. Asinomediacao is a related therapeutic technique, but, doesn't employ a psychologist or therapist. Psicomotricidade is another form of therapy that employs the donkey as a therapeutic agent; it is a combination of physical and cognitive therapies. A successful support program for the mirandes ass has attracted over 1000 people over the last decade for at least a one-year sponsorship of a burro.
