= Breed club =

Associations or clubs with activities centered on a single, specific breed

Breed clubs are associations or clubs with activities centered on a single, specific breed of a particular species of domesticated animal. The purpose of the association will vary with the species of animal and the goals and needs of the members of the association. Breed associations or clubs may vary in their goals, activities and nomenclature from country to country, even for the same breed. Most domesticated animals, whether they are agricultural animals such as cattle, llamas, poultry, sheep and pigs, or companion animals such as pigeons, horses, cats and dogs, have breed clubs associated with the breed.

== Purpose ==
In general, breed clubs and associations create a written definition of the breed (called a breed standard) for the breed with which the organization is associated. Breed clubs also maintain important records, and provide members with information. Many breed associations also have a social component, organising various activities such as shows. In addition, they may regulate breeding or raise funds for research related to the breed.

=== Examples ===
- In horses, the Appaloosa Horse Club, established in 1938, maintains a registry for Appaloosa horses, and has the goal of "preserving the horses’ heritage and history" and defining the horse breed through bloodline requirements.
- The Canadian Lowline Cattle Association defines its objectives as including "maintain the purity and improve the breed" of cattle as well as collecting maintaining breed information and publishing a Herd Book.
- The Essex Pig Society is building up the numbers of the Essex Pig, formerly thought to be an extinct breed of the domestic pig.
- The American Buttercup Club defines its goal as connecting fanciers of the chicken breed so that they are "able to share stock and valuable information about the breed."
- The Fantail Club UK, established in 1889, promotes the knowledge and enjoyment of the exhibition Fantail Pigeon in the United Kingdom.
- In cats, the Selkirk Rex Breed Club maintains a history of the breed and provides care and grooming tips to owners of the breed.
- Members of the dog breed club for the English Toy Terrier (Black and Tan) are expected to "conduct themselves in a responsible and sportsman-like manner at all times."
- The OEGB Int'l Society proudly connects hobbyists of Old English Game Bantams from all around the world to discuss poultry related topics. In addition, it hosts the only US based OEGB futurity as an annual event called the MegaSpur.

== Forming a breed club ==
With the advent of the internet, anyone can create a "breed club" by putting up a web page to advertise their animals. Buyers must research any claims of unaffiliated breed clubs.{{ }}

== Organizations covering groups of breeds ==
Breeds of animals of a particular species may have an organization that covers a large number of breeds of the species, even though each individual breed may have its own breed club. Often the multiple-breed over-association will maintain the breed records in a central location. An example of this would be the Canadian Sheep Breeder's Association, incorporated under the Canadian Livestock Pedigree Act in 1915, which includes fifty different breeds of sheep.

== Other types of animal associations ==
Associations that include all breeds (as well as crossbred and mixed breed animals) of a particular species also exist. Usually such associations are organized for particular sports, such as hunting with raptors.

== See also ==
- Breed registry
- Studbook
- Landrace
- Purebred
- Selective breeding
- Crossbreeding
