= Donkeys in France =

Donkey in France
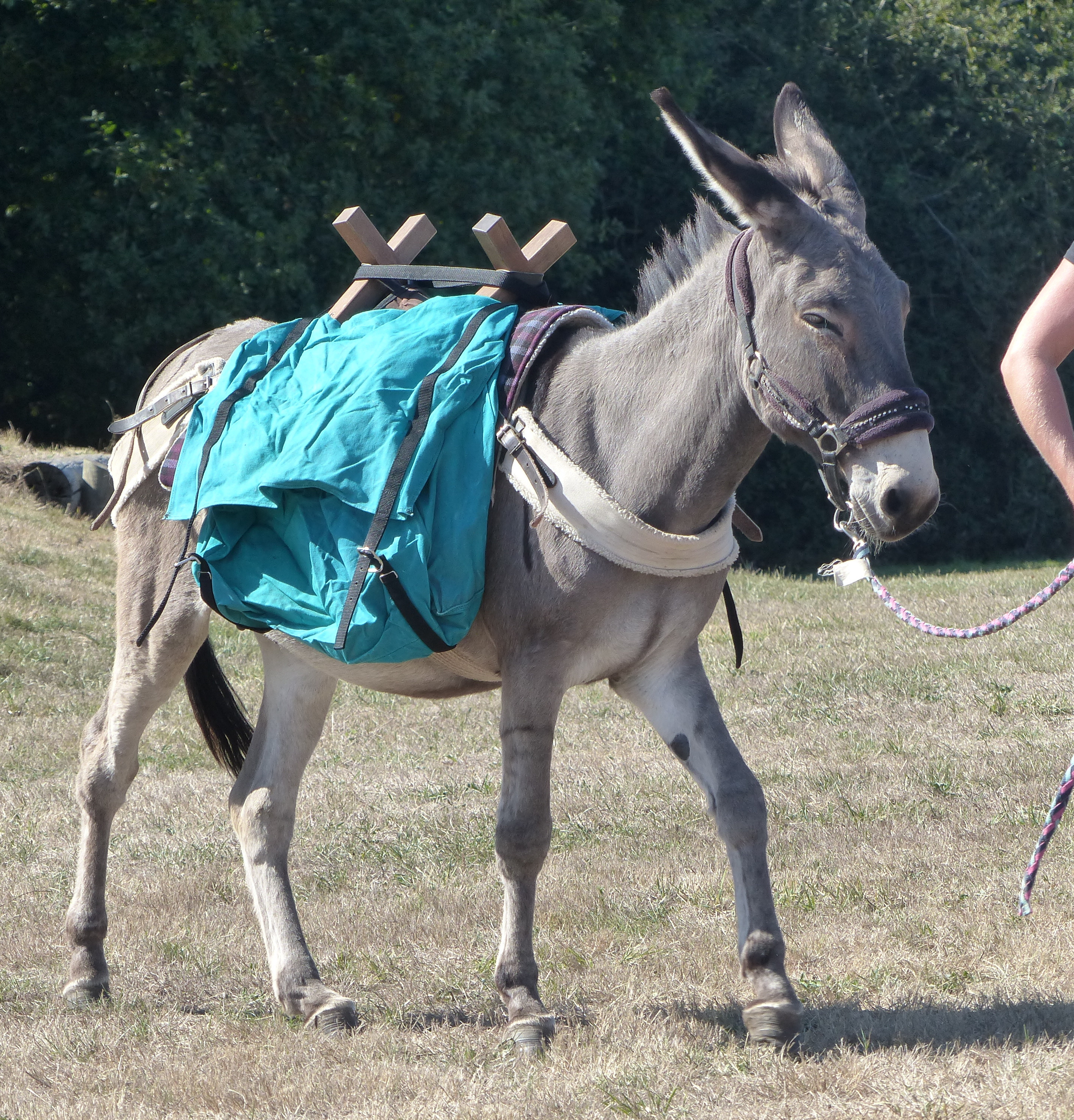
- Cotentin donkey in Rennes in 2019.
- Breed: Donkey (Equus asinus); seven breeds recognized, one in the process of being recognized

Donkeys in France have been employed primarily for companionship and tourism purposes since the 1970s. They were first introduced during the Gallo-Roman period and later in the late Merovingian era, becoming integrated into medieval animal symbolism. Historically, donkeys were primarily employed as pack and draught animals for modest farmers, and until the mid-20th century, they were essential for any job requiring the transport of goods. The species experienced a decline with the mechanization of agriculture, leading to the near-extinction of French donkey breeds and the implementation of conservation measures.

The Manche department of Normandy currently hosts the largest population of donkeys in France. France breeds a diverse and widely dispersed donkey population, with seven officially recognized breeds. Currently, donkeys are predominantly bred for conservation, with their utilization in market gardening becoming increasingly uncommon. Additionally, there is a commercial sector for donkey milk.

Donkeys have left a significant imprint on French culture, featuring prominently in proverbs, popular songs, games, tales, legends, and novels. Despite the frequent portrayal of donkeys in proverbs as foolish creatures, traditional beliefs often depict them as pious and virtuous animals, as well as symbols of wealth. This is exemplified in the popular fairy tale of Donkeyskin.

== History ==
Donkeys are not native to France; they originally came from the Horn of Africa. They were sporadically and limitedly imported during the Gallo-Roman era, then more widely introduced to northern France in the late Merovingian period (7th and 8th centuries). According to archaeozoologists Benoît Clavel and Jean-Hervé Yvinec, donkeys were present on 12% of studied rural sites during the early Middle Ages. The donkeys spread throughout France, especially in rural areas, within two to three centuries. Clavel and Yvinec estimate that 5 to 10% of equid remains from this period belong to hybrids between donkeys and horses. Veterinarian Anne-Caroline Chambry highlights that donkeys “were long a part of the French landscape, seen everywhere from markets to roads and farms”.

=== From the Middle Ages to the 17th century ===
The donkey acquired a prominent symbolic place from the Middle Ages, like other exotic animals such as the lion, by becoming, especially in medieval encyclopedias, a symbol of stupidity and foolishness. According to medievalist and art historian Michel Pastoureau, the existence of the dunce cap is attested as early as the 12th century in cathedral schools. During the medieval period, donkey skin was utilized to create parchment, and various parchment festivals were held on these occasions, particularly at the Abbey of Saint-Denis.

The donkey is referenced by the philosopher Jean Buridan in his parable of Buridan's Donkey, illustrating the difficulty of deciding. Although the donkey in question was, according to Pastoureau, purely symbolic and never existed outside of a verbal jousting, this paradox illustrates the proverbial stupidity of the animal. It was later often referenced and commented on, notably by Voltaire.

The donkey also appears in medieval and Renaissance animal trials. The archives of the provost of Dijon mention that in 1405, a donkey was put to death as punishment for killing a child. These sources also mention trials for bestiality, such as an ass-driver from Villeneuve-l'Archevêque (Champagne) who was condemned on January 8, 1558, to be hanged and then burned with his donkey for having sexual relations with it. A similar trial in the Parliament of Paris on November 24, 1542, resulted in the condemnation of a man from Loudun (Anjou) to be strangled and burned with his donkey. Similar trials existed, with judges in the 17th century being more lenient towards the animal.

=== From the 17th to the late 18th century ===
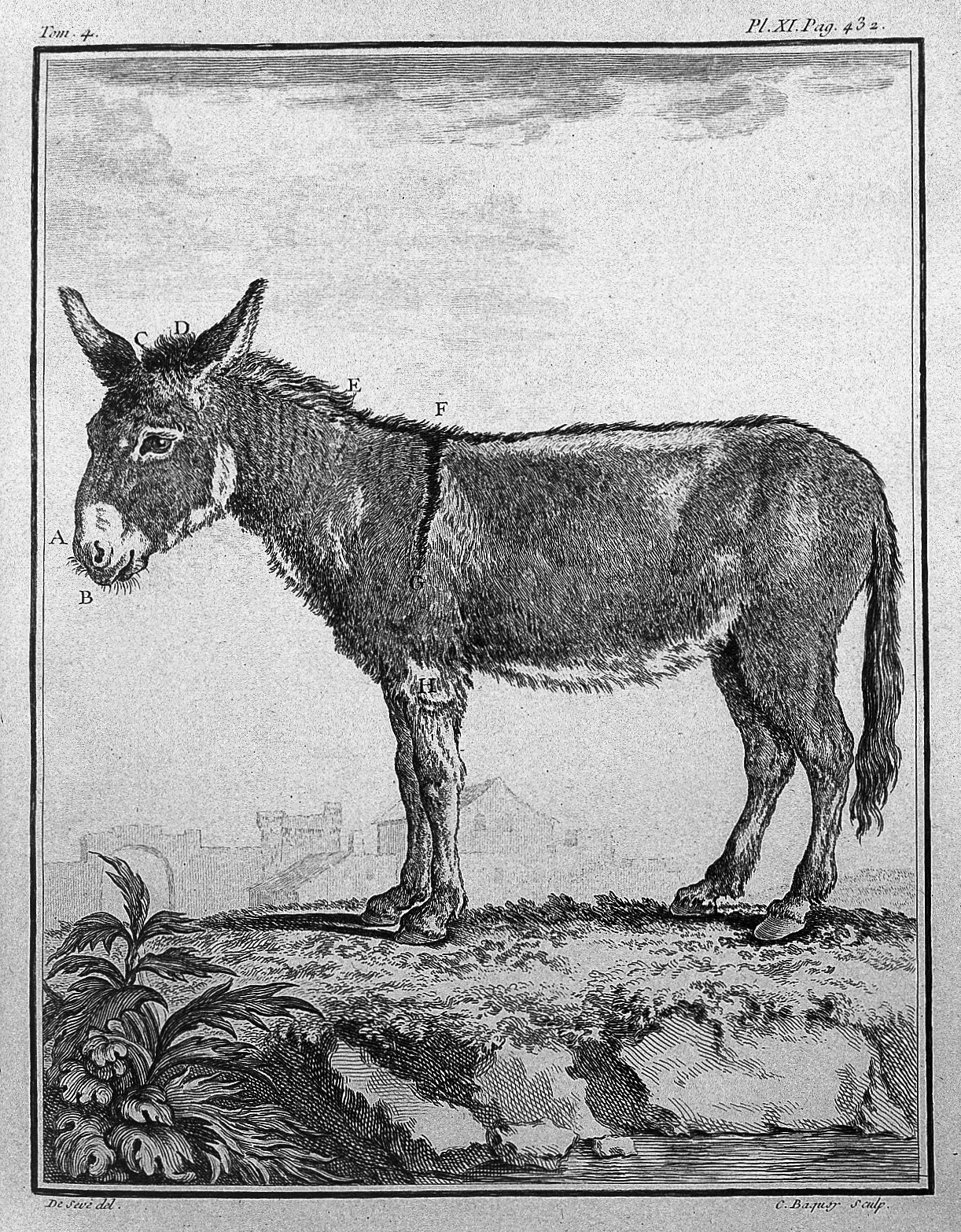
The donkey, as depicted in the Histoire Naturelle by Comte de Buffon, in the second half of the 18th century.

In the 17th century, the "infamous" donkey ride, called "asinade" or "asouade", is mentioned in France as part of the charivari. This practice possibly originated from ancient Greek traditions that sought to highlight the ridiculous and highly sexualized aspects associated with the donkey. British historian Martin Ingram, in a study of historical social control mechanisms in Europe, notes that the "asouade", which was organized during the French charivari, was a form of punishment for women who beat their husbands. From the second half of the 18th century onwards, the "asinade" became a public humiliation punishment, adopted particularly in Paris and southern France. This punishment was inflicted on brothel-keepers from 1760 in Toulouse. In Mémoires manuscrites, Toulouse chronicler Pierre Barthès provides a detailed account of the public humiliation and punishment of brothel-keepers. Barthès writes that a brothel keeper was "condemned to be paraded through the whole city, with a rope around her neck, held by the executioner, and wearing a feathered helmet adorned with bells, a small mantlet over her shoulders in a similar fashion, mounted on a donkey facing its tail, escorted by the entire watch, with the executioner's assistant leading the donkey by the halter." This form of humiliation was reserved exclusively for women, while men convicted of pimping were required to follow the procession on foot.

Buffon's description of the donkey in the encyclopedia Histoire Naturelle reflects, according to Anne-Caroline Chambry, the contempt in which this animal was held at the time. Before the French Revolution, some postal services, particularly in the South, were only served by donkeys.

=== From the 19th century to 1914 ===
While it is challenging to ascertain the precise number of French donkeys in the 19th century, the pervasiveness of cultural production referencing them is evidence of their prominent presence in society at the time. In 1862, most donkeys were in the Paris Basin, with a density of approximately 10 donkeys per 1,000 inhabitants. Thirty years later, they were mostly found in the Berry region. Some French regions maintained a tradition of donkey breeding, particularly Normandy, Poitou, Berry, Bourbonnais, the Pyrenees, and Provence. Agricultural practices in plain regions likely favored the donkey's rarity.

Historically, the donkey was utilized for agricultural purposes, particularly in the transportation of heavy loads such as milk cans in Normandy and young lambs in Provence. In the southern Alps and Haute-Loire, donkeys were bred for export to other French regions or Italy. Families that utilized the donkey's labor often developed a close relationship with the animal, as the donkey represented an exception to the traditional spatial separation between humans and animals in Provence. It was not uncommon for the stable housing of the donkey to be situated on the ground floor of the domicile, near the wood and food supplies.

=== The donkey during World War I ===
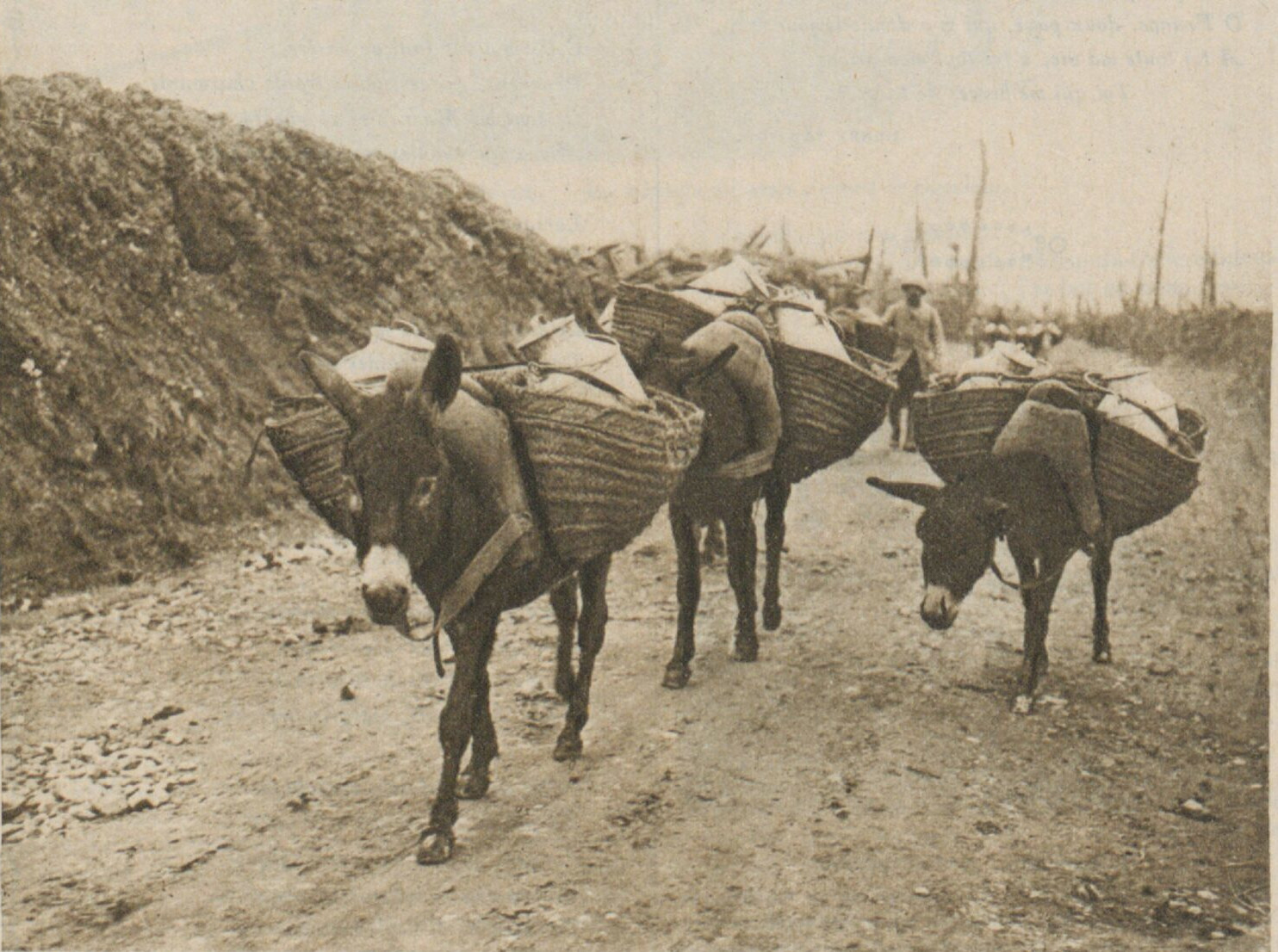
Donkeys supplied the Somme trenches during the World War I (December 1916).

It is a lesser-known fact that donkeys played an important role during World War I. Initially, in 1914, only horses and mules were requisitioned, with donkeys excluded from the requisition plan. The advent of trench warfare led to their mobilization.

The French Armed Forces then enlisted the assistance of these donkeys, which were primarily imported from North Africa, particularly Algeria, for logistical purposes. The exact number of these animals remains unknown. Their diminutive size allowed them to navigate the trenches, avoiding enemy fire. They were mobilized in the Somme, Flanders, Artois, and Aisne to provide supplies to the infantry, engineers, and artillery. These donkeys, equipped with indigenous packs, were notably mobilized during the Battle of Verdun in 1916.

To prevent them from braying and alerting the enemy, their nostrils were slit vertically. Their reputation among soldiers was generally good. Of all the French equids mobilized, donkeys suffered the most from food shortages, according to Éric Baratay. This was because they were fed only after horses were maximally protected by their riders, while donkeys had no assigned caretakers.

Following the war conclusion surviving donkeys whose owners could be located were returned to them. However, those that could not be reclaimed by civilian owners, particularly the "small African donkeys", were slaughtered despite their contributions. With the advent of animal studies, Raymond Boissy gathered testimonies from veterans and civilians about the donkeys that served at Verdun. Statistical data does not permit a number estimation of French donkeys that perished during the Great War, as only horses and mules were counted. In his analysis, Jean-Michel Derex posits that this phenomenon represents a form of hierarchy among animals.

=== Decline ===
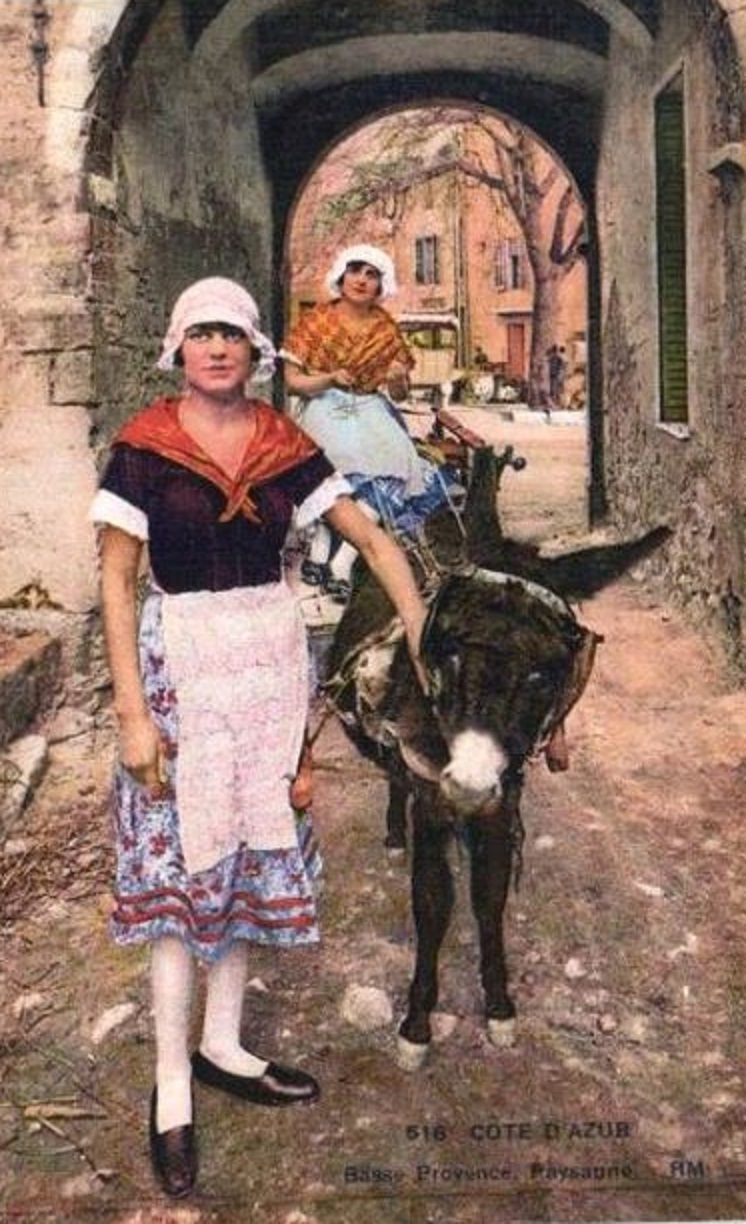
Haut-Var village women with their donkeys, on a postcard from the 1920s.

The gradual motorization of activities in the 20th century led to a generalized decline in the use and breeding of donkeys. Motor vehicles competed with donkeys in their economic transport functions. The general motorization of agricultural activities also contributed to their decline. For example, donkeys were historically used to operate olive presses, but these tools increasingly ran on internal combustion or electric motors. Dr. Anne-Caroline Chambry attributes the decline of donkeys in part to rural exodus, as the animals remained in rural areas while disappearing from large French cities.

The decline of the French donkey population commenced in the early decades of the 20th century and became particularly pronounced in the 1950s, with a drastic reduction in numbers. Following the conclusion of World War II, the French donkey density dropped to a mere two or three donkeys per thousand inhabitants. The evolution of the purchasing price of donkeys reflects the collapse of their labor value. In 1892, the purchase price of a donkey equated to approximately one and a half months of a worker's wages. Between 1950 and the early 20th century, the relative purchasing cost of a donkey halved, with the average price of a donkey now equivalent to one-third of a worker's monthly salary.

The associated agricultural skills and culture also disappeared. Donkeys persisted slightly longer in sharecropping regions, such as Berry and Bourbonnais, and in small agricultural areas. In 1977, an INRA survey concluded that the Poitou donkey would have entirely disappeared by the century's end if no preservation efforts were undertaken.

=== Preservation ===
While horses have been the subject of numerous scientific studies in France, donkeys have been relatively understudied since the 1980s. Facing the risk of extinction of donkey breeds, various actors from the 1990s onwards mobilized to preserve this living heritage. Annick Audiot was a pioneer in this field, conducting a study on the Poitou donkey in 1977, which found only 44 individuals at the time. In 1978, a new profession of donkey trekking guides emerged, gradually becoming professionalized.

This was accompanied by the creation of studbooks to manage French donkey breeds and combat inbreeding. The Haras Nationaux, now the French Institute of Horse and Riding (IFCE), supported this preservation effort by officially recognizing French donkey breeds. Donkey centers were established in Lignières, Braize, and Dampierre-sur-Boutonne. The number of French donkeys increased from 23,000 to 35,000 between 1985 and 1994.

Nevertheless, the criteria for defining French donkey breeds were established relatively late. These criteria, which define the breeds, led to the selection of well-characterized animals and the elimination of the "common donkey of old rural France," which resulted from random crossbreeding and did not meet any breed standards. The Berry and Pyrenean donkeys were influenced by individuals from outside France to reduce inbreeding. To reduce inbreeding in herds, breeder associations began searching for donkeys meeting their breed standards in neighboring regions. The most recently characterized breed is the Corsican donkey, which has not yet been officially recognized.

The 2008 financial crisis had a detrimental impact on donkey breeding, resulting in a consistent decline in numbers and new births between 2006 and 2015. The emergence of novel applications for donkeys has prompted inquiries within the social sciences regarding the evolving relationship between these animals and the rupture they represent with past uses. Michel Lompech and colleagues have identified this phenomenon as a transformation of the domestication system within a post-modern society.

== Practices and uses ==
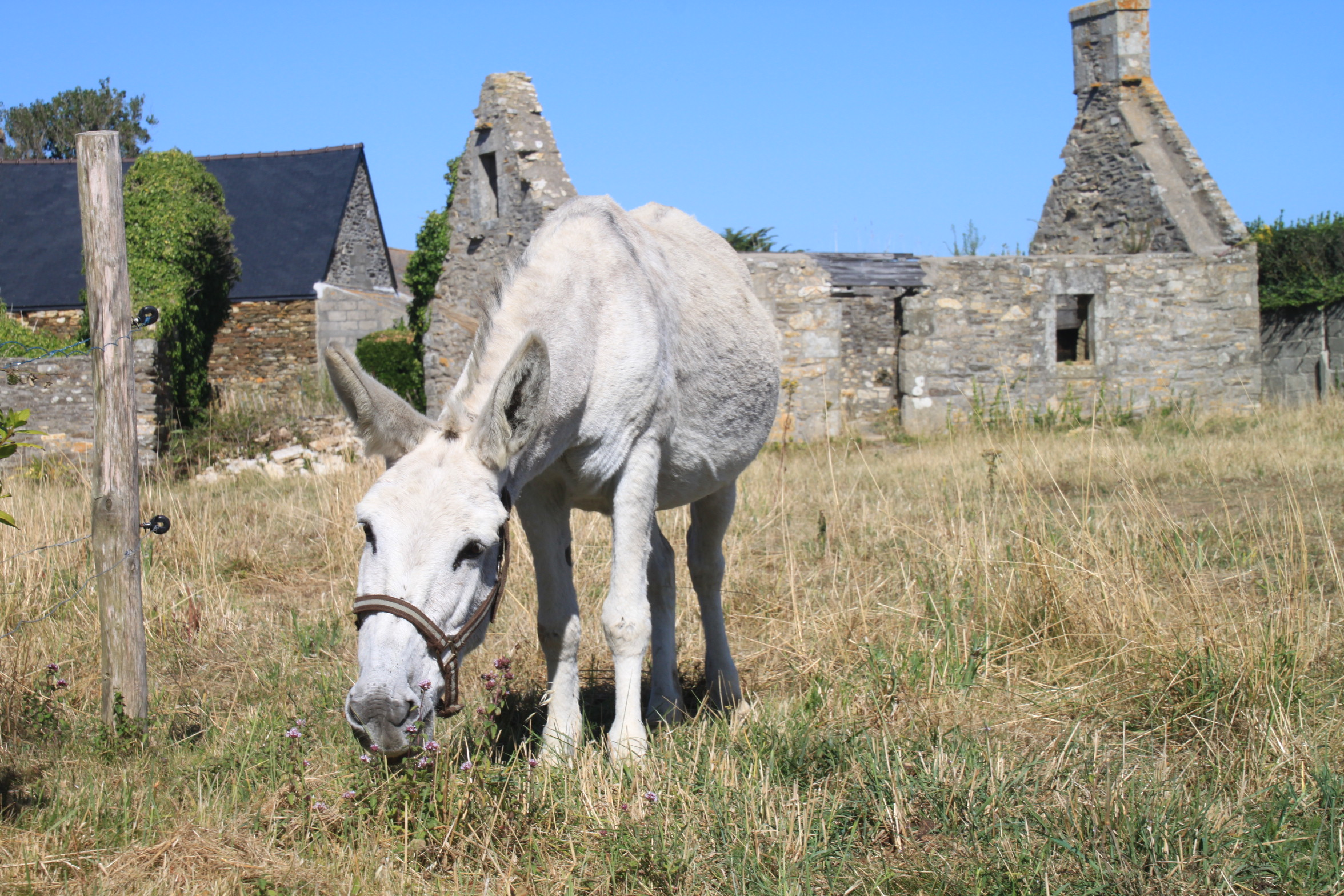
Donkey near the calvary and chapel at Tronoën, Brittany.

The population of donkey owners in France is highly diverse and fragmented. The majority of these owners are amateurs who acquire a donkey as a pet or to conserve endangered breeds. Donkeys are then used as ecological lawn mowers in peri-urban areas. Economic activities involving them are most common in economically disadvantaged regions, linked to initiatives promoting local production.

The transformation in the utilization of donkeys has been accompanied by a transformation in the social group of owners, which has become exceedingly heterogeneous. Lompech et al. identify three principal social groups of donkey owners:

- Farmers inheriting a family tradition;
- Neo-rurals who have built a life project around the donkey;
- Individuals who acquired a donkey as a pet and out of passion.

Another noteworthy aspect is the growing number of women among donkey owners. Retired farmers sometimes keep donkeys for leisure and pleasure. This sociological diversity among donkey owners has led to tensions between amateurs and professionals within breeding associations.

Donkey breeding has minimal economic significance, as it is primarily for conservation purposes. The market value of a donkey is significantly low in France, with some amateurs even offering their donkeys for free, which devalues the work of selection and dressage by professional breeders. Donkeys have the advantage of being frugal and able to graze on small, inaccessible plots. However, they are not genuinely integrated into French agro-industrial production chains. Some associations take care of elderly donkeys to avoid slaughter and provide them with a retirement home. Cases of donkey abuse are handled by associations that find new owners for them.

Donkeys are employed in eco-grazing in France, particularly in the Pyrenees. They are utilized in active mobility, for school transport, and waste collection. Additionally, donkeys are employed in donkey-assisted therapy, which fosters social connections, generally for the elderly or disabled.

=== Agricultural activities ===
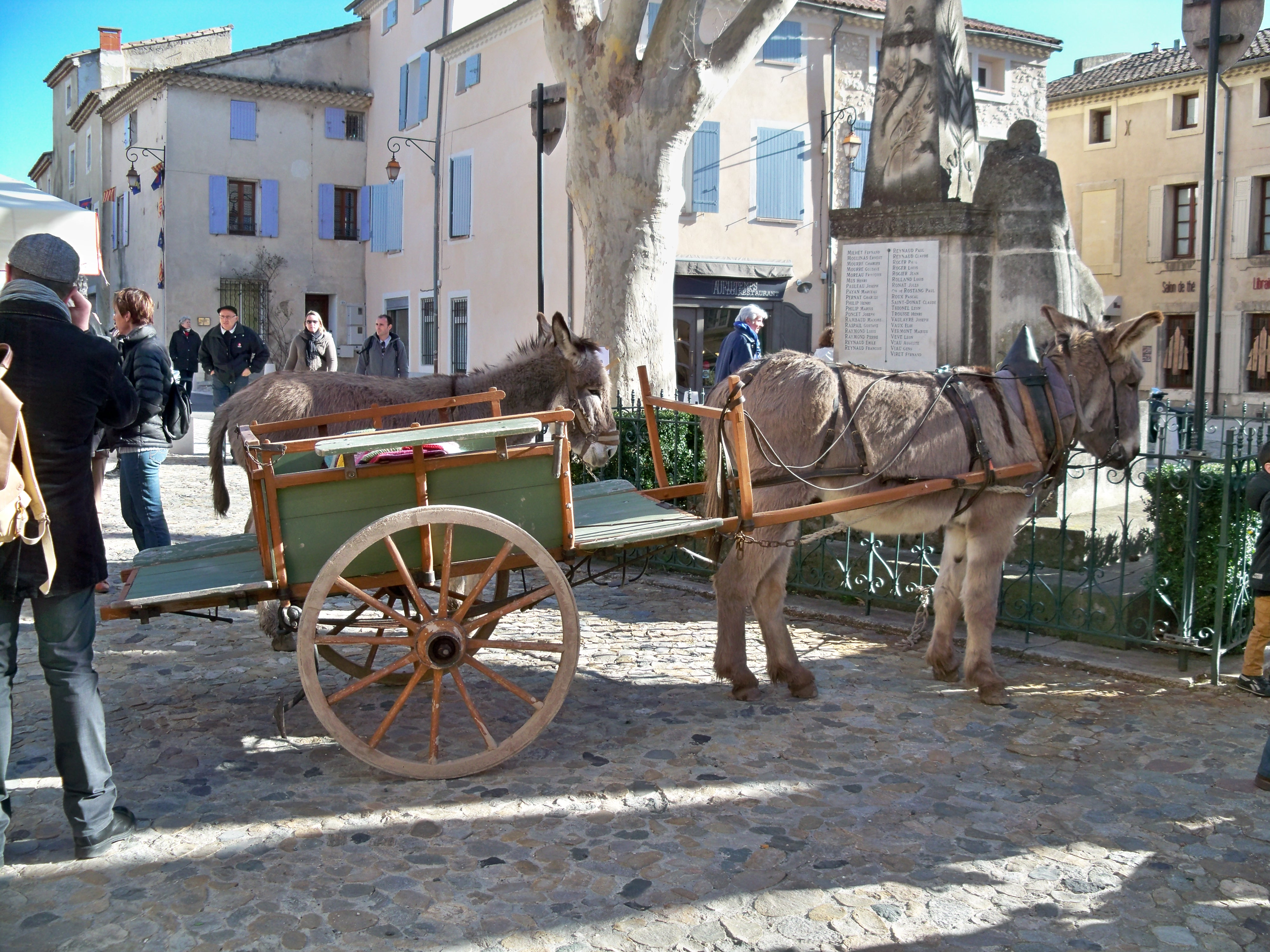
Provence donkey harnessed in Pernes-les-Fontaines (Vaucluse).

Historically, the donkey has been associated with subsistence farming, particularly among small peasants, laborers, and sharecroppers. While it was once primarily employed in agricultural activities, this use has become rare and secondary.

It is still used by market gardeners, especially in the Southwest. In 2020, the French Society for Working Equines (SFET) recorded market gardeners working with donkeys. A survey of 80 French market gardening operations, primarily small farms of a few hectares located in Western France and engaged in organic farming, revealed that donkeys are used in this context. On average, each farm employs two donkeys, which complement the use of motorized agricultural machinery. It is therefore evident that improving available traction equipment is crucial for sustaining the agricultural use of donkeys.

=== Donkey milk industry ===
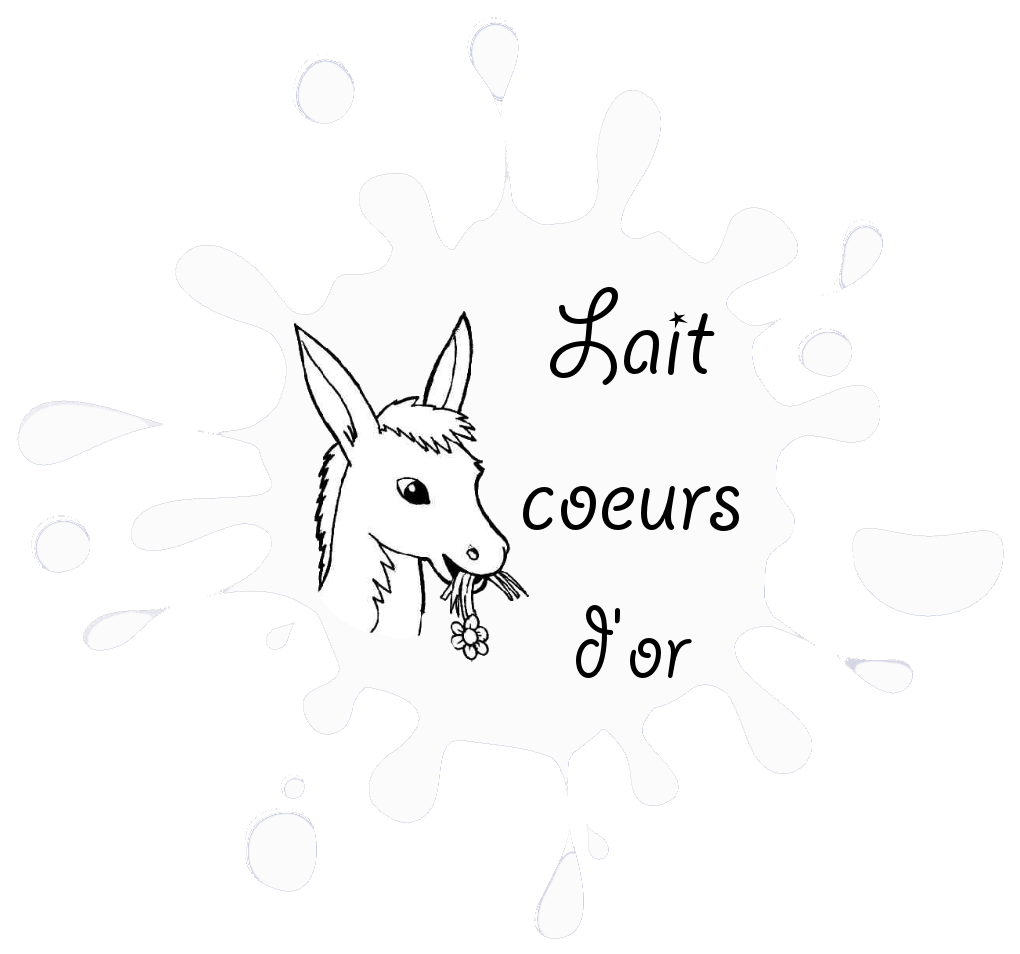
Logo for a dairy farm producing donkey milk cosmetics.

In France, the dairy industry is well-developed, producing and selling a variety of products, including donkey milk soap and various cosmetic and medicinal goods. The similarity between donkey milk and human breast milk is often highlighted in the marketing of these products.

The industry began in 1998, mainly involving female farmers. It is a delicate activity to manage due to the low milk productivity of donkeys. Furthermore, these farms must also address the sale of male foals and devise solutions for retired donkeys, as the practice of sending donkeys to slaughter is socially frowned upon. One challenge is the selection of a dairy breed, as no French donkey breed is specifically bred for this purpose.

=== Donkey meat ===
According to Tristan Sicard and Yanis Varoutsikos, donkey meat was consumed by the poor population during the Middle Ages, but it is now rarely eaten. Breeding donkeys for this purpose is not among the stated goals of breeders at the birth of their animals. Furthermore, there is no selection of French donkeys based on meat production. However, some French donkeys can be sold to dealers and thus sent to the slaughterhouse. Lompech et al.. note in their study that some industry players wish to revive sausage production, which currently requires the importation of meat. A production sector for "donkey sausage" exists in Ardèche (a product often mistakenly perceived as typically Corsican), for which donkey meat is imported from South America.

=== Tourism ===
Chambry observes that the donkey, once a common sight, has "practically acquired the status of an exotic animal," attracting urban populations, especially children, who enjoy donkey rides.

==== Hiking ====
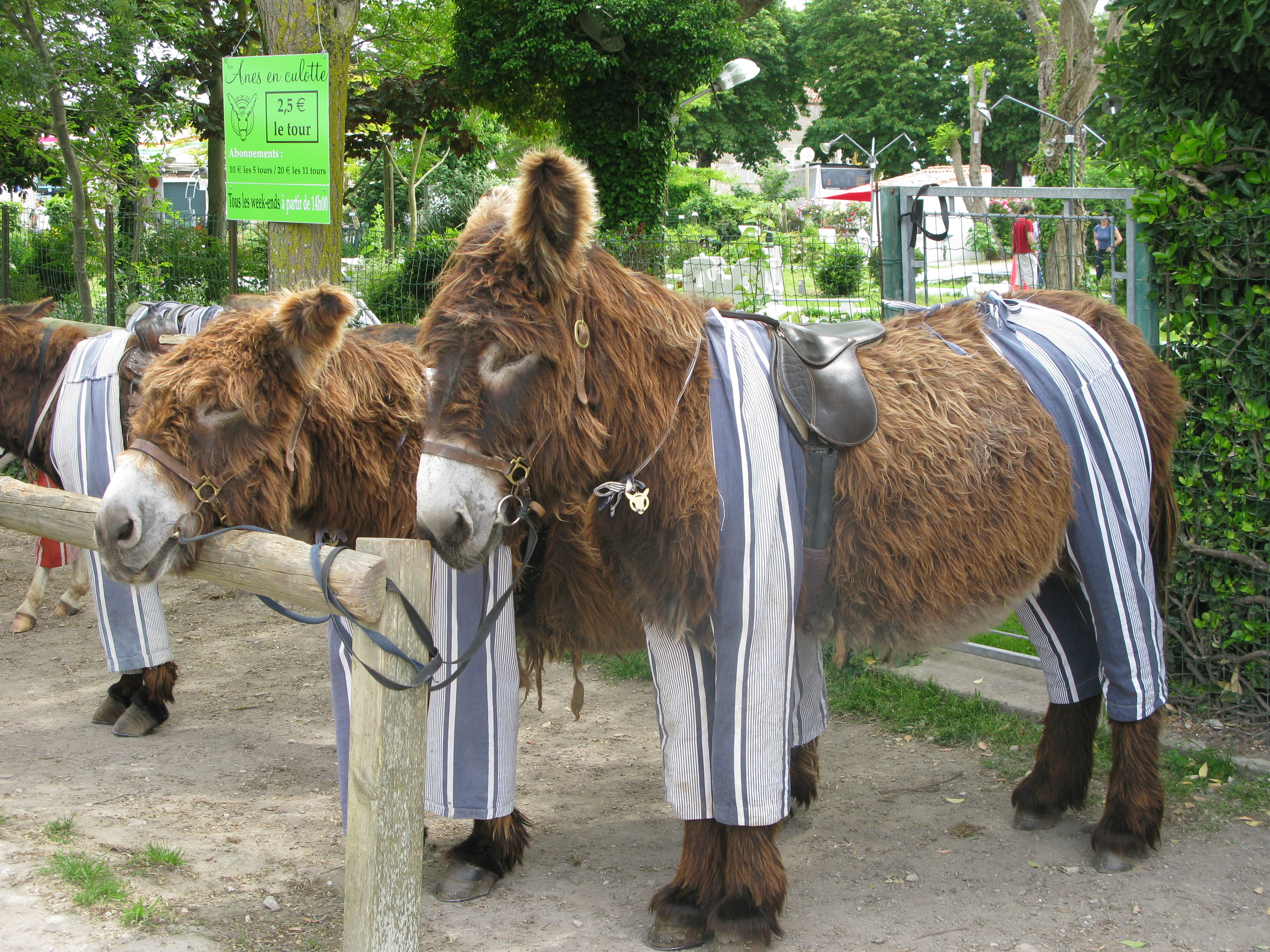
Poitou donkeys in their breeches on the Ile de Ré, as part of a tourist trail.

Since the 1980s, donkey trekking has developed in certain regions, notably along the Camino de Santiago. Despite the necessity for extensive training of the animals and good organizational skills, this activity is lucrative. Furthermore, it has increased the value of trained donkeys.

These activities are generally run by professional donkey handlers in mountainous regions, particularly in the Pyrenees, Auvergne, and the Cévennes. The selection of donkeys for their ability to carry loads has been a consideration in the context of the tourism economy.

==== Leisure parks and educational farms ====
In 1996, the "Parc du Fou de l'ne" was established in Amboise, showcasing fourteen donkey breeds on a four-hectare site with educational exhibits. It ceased operations at the beginning of 2011.

In the same year, the "Pôle du Cheval et de l’ ne" opened the Sitazin museum, located between Lignières and La Celle-Condé, which is dedicated to the history and physiology of the donkey, and the donkey paddock, which is a conservation area that presents the seven French breeds. There are also numerous educational farms dedicated to donkey breeds, such as the Maison de l' ne in Beauvoir-sur-Mer and Océ'âne in Lanvéoc.

=== Associative network ===
The seven recognized donkey breed associations in France are federated within the "France Nés et Mulets" federation, based in Paris, which represents and defends French donkey and mule breeders and users registered in a breed registry. Additionally, the SFET defends the use of donkeys and represents it to the French Ministry of Agriculture.

=== Hybrids ===
As is the case in other countries, French donkeys can hybridize with horses to produce mules or hinnies. There was a well-known mule industry in Poitou, from where Poitevin mules were exported to numerous countries.

== Breeding ==
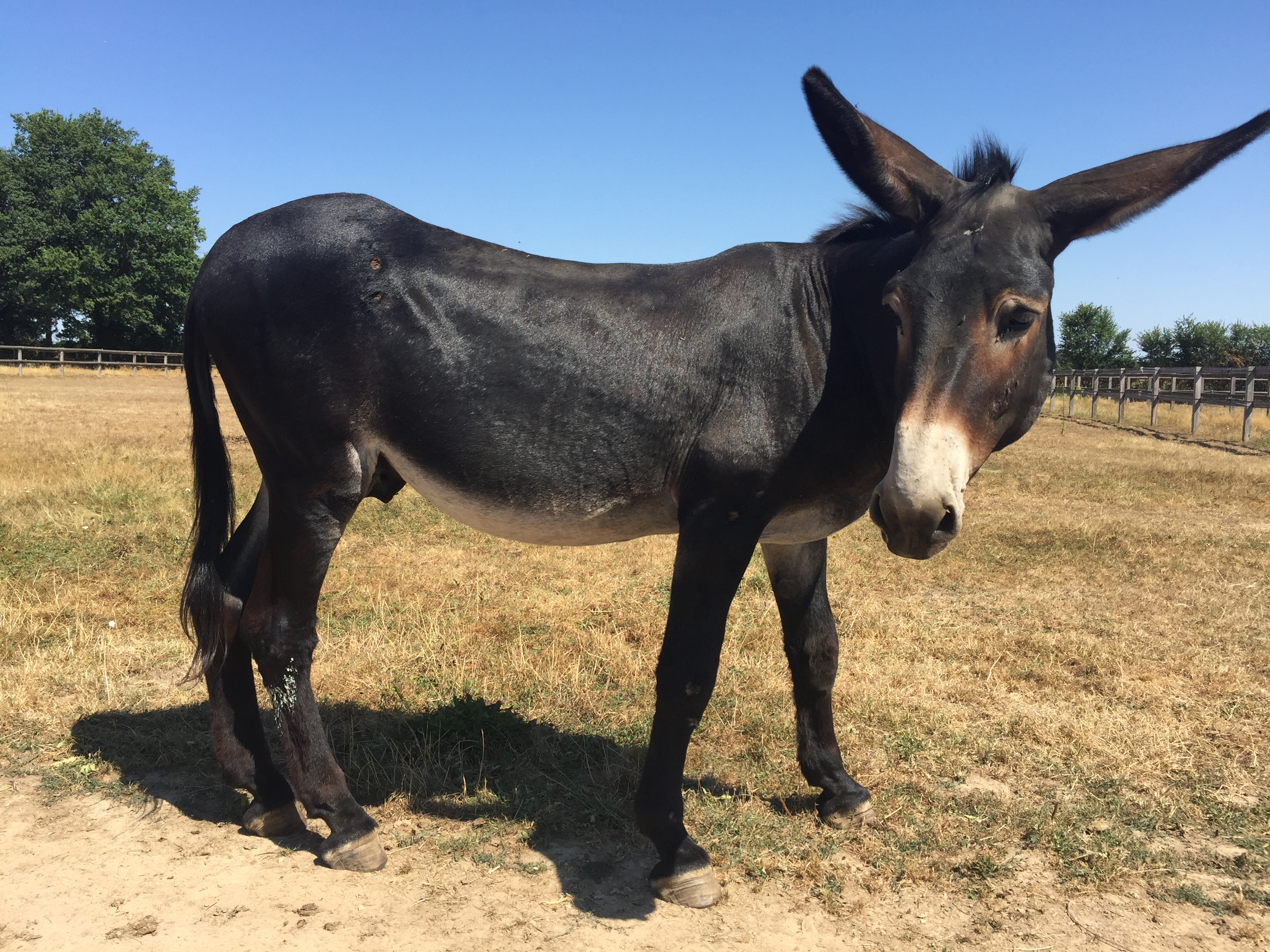
Grand noir du Berry at La Celle-Condé (Cher).

The French donkey population is in a state of decline, with the National Institute of Donkeys and Mules (INAM) reporting 78,000 donkeys in France in 2010, and the agricultural census indicating 31,583 asinine equines (including hinnies and mules). This decline is a cause for concern concerning generational renewal. The dispersed population also presents a challenge, as donkey owners frequently have to travel long distances to breed their animals.

Donkeys are not precisely counted by French and European statistical tools, often being mixed with horses in these data sources. Moreover, animals owned by individuals and amateurs are not always counted, with most of these animals not found on professional farms.

There are a few large breeding farms or donkey farms in France, which can have several dozen donkeys. Their activities are diversified, combining dairy and tourism. In 2019, the largest donkey farm in France was located in Vauroux, Oise. Outside of dairy farms, it is uncommon for donkey breeding to be the sole activity of professional agricultural structures, as most are diversified, such as cattle/donkey or beekeeping/donkey farms.

In 2018, a study by Michel Lompech and colleagues utilized cross-referenced data sources to conclude that donkeys are notably prevalent in the French department of Manche, which boasts the largest herd with 1,100 heads. This is followed by Seine-Maritime (800) and Calvados (600), collectively establishing Normandy as the leading French donkey breeding region. Other regions with a notable presence of donkeys include the Massif Central and its northern bocage regions, as well as the Alps, Provence, Pyrenees, and Corsica. Conversely, donkeys are notably scarce in cereal plain regions, Brittany, the North, the Centre, and all regions east of the Paris Basin. The Berry and Bourbonnais regions have long been associated with this breeding, as have the Pyrenees.

France has a diverse donkey population, comprising seven officially recognized breeds. Each breed is the subject of an association dedicated to its preservation and promotion. As of 2019, selection is primarily focused on maintaining breed standards and work aptitude, particularly for tourism and working with children. Historically, French donkey breeds did not all have the same selection goal. The Poitou donkey is associated with mule production, while the Grand Noir du Berry was selected for field, vineyard, and barge traction.

== Culture ==
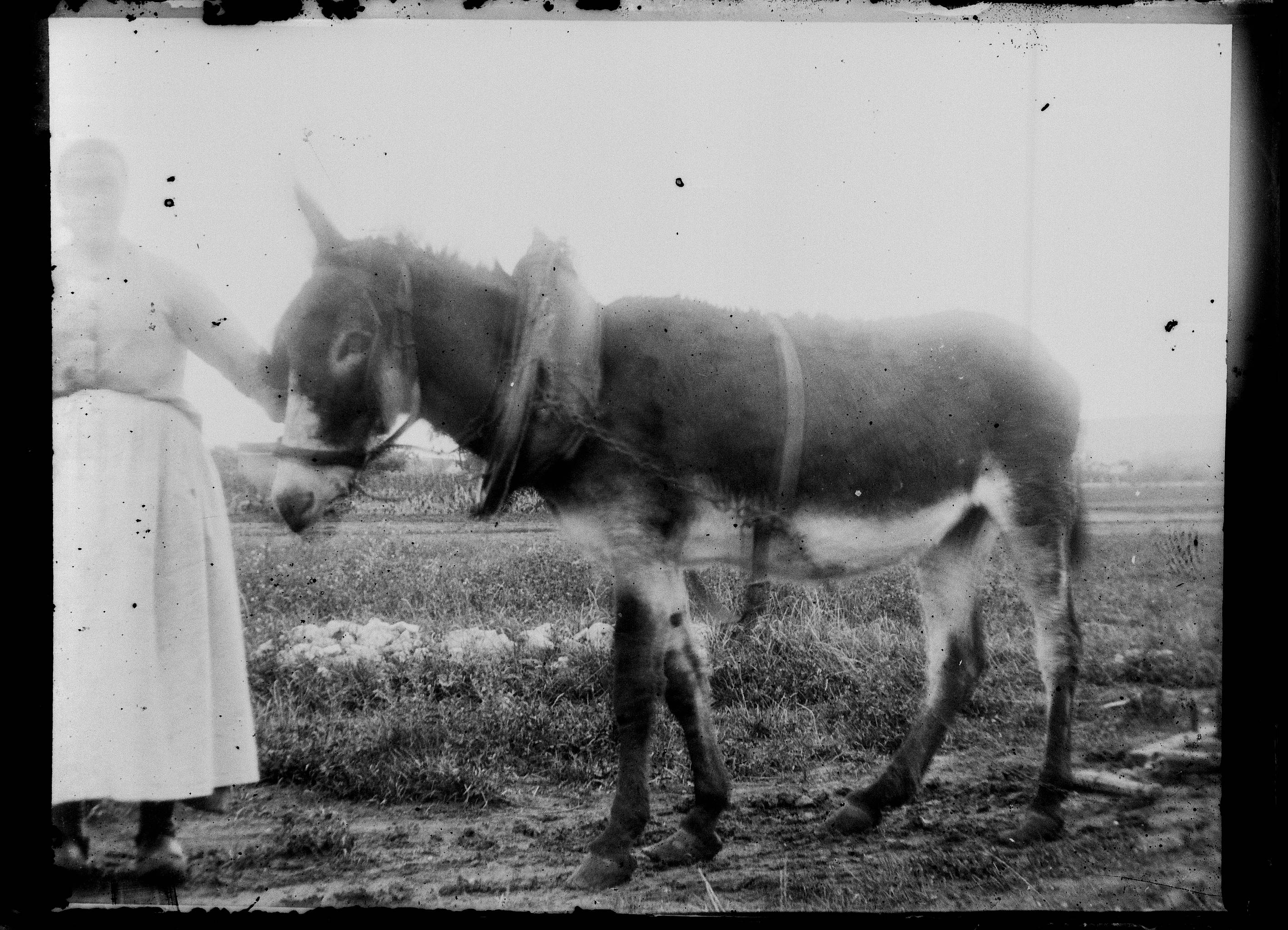
Donkey held by a French woman, early 20th century.

Donkeys have a profound influence on French culture, as evidenced by their frequent appearance in proverbs and sayings, popular songs, games, tales, legends, and French literature. They continue to engage the interest of French scholars and amateur historians, who collect and interpret old postcards depicting them. Michel Pastoureau notes that, since Antiquity, donkeys have been symbolically associated with a range of negative traits, including folly, ignorance, stubbornness, laziness, lewdness, and the opposite of these, humility, sobriety, and patience. Their role as a suffering victim working for their master imbues them with a Christ-like value, as evidenced by their portrayal in the Nativity and as Jesus' mount.

In the field of dream interpretation, the inhabitants of the Vosges region of France once believed that dreaming of a donkey portended mental sorrow and misfortune. Throughout the 19th century, donkeys were associated with the hardworking populace or innocent children, as well as humility and virtue. This is evident in the works of Achille Lemot, published by Le Pèlerin, and Émile Souvestre.

According to various authors, the symbolic value of the donkey is likely to change in the 21st century, as its modern uses are far removed from its former laborious work. It is no longer a symbol of hard agricultural labor and is gradually joining the category of companion animals. Additionally, there is a form of heritage recognition, notably through donkey festivals in various French regions.

=== Nomenclature ===
Historically, there are numerous terms for "donkey" in the French language. The French word âne is derived from the Old French asne. In 1881, French ethnologist Eugène Rolland cited a wide variety of phrases used to name the donkey, including bête asine, asine in the Morvan, aine in the Berry, aune in the Mâconnais, asé and its variant azé in Provençal Occitan, asou Additionally, it is worth noting that the variant azou is used in Béarnais, aë in Nice, bourri in Allier, bourricot and its variants (such as bourriquet) in various French regions (names Rolland attributes to the presence of fuzz on the donkey's coat), azen in Breton, and asto in Basque. Additionally, various nicknames for the donkey have been documented, including "Baudouin" in the 15th and 16th centuries (which gave rise to "Baudet") and "Martin" since then. According to folklorist Paul Sébillot, the practice of nicknaming donkeys "Martin" can be traced back to the 18th century. Before this, the nickname "Bernars li asne" was prevalent.

Pastoureau notes that the proper name "Aliboron," which may be a corruption of the Islamic philosopher Al-Biruni's name, was attributed to the donkey from the 15th century (notably by Rabelais) to describe a pedantic and narrow-minded person. This eventually led to the name becoming a common epithet for any donkey in the 18th century.

=== Medicinal use ===
Historically, certain parts of the donkey were utilized in the preparation of remedies. In the 16th century, a burned and powdered donkey hoof was reputed to cure St. John's disease (an old name for epilepsy). A list of 16th-century witch's aphrodisiacs cites donkey brain in a preparation. Saint-Simon reports that Louis XIV's physician prescribed him a tonic made from the ashes of a donkey penis.

=== Proverbs and sayings ===
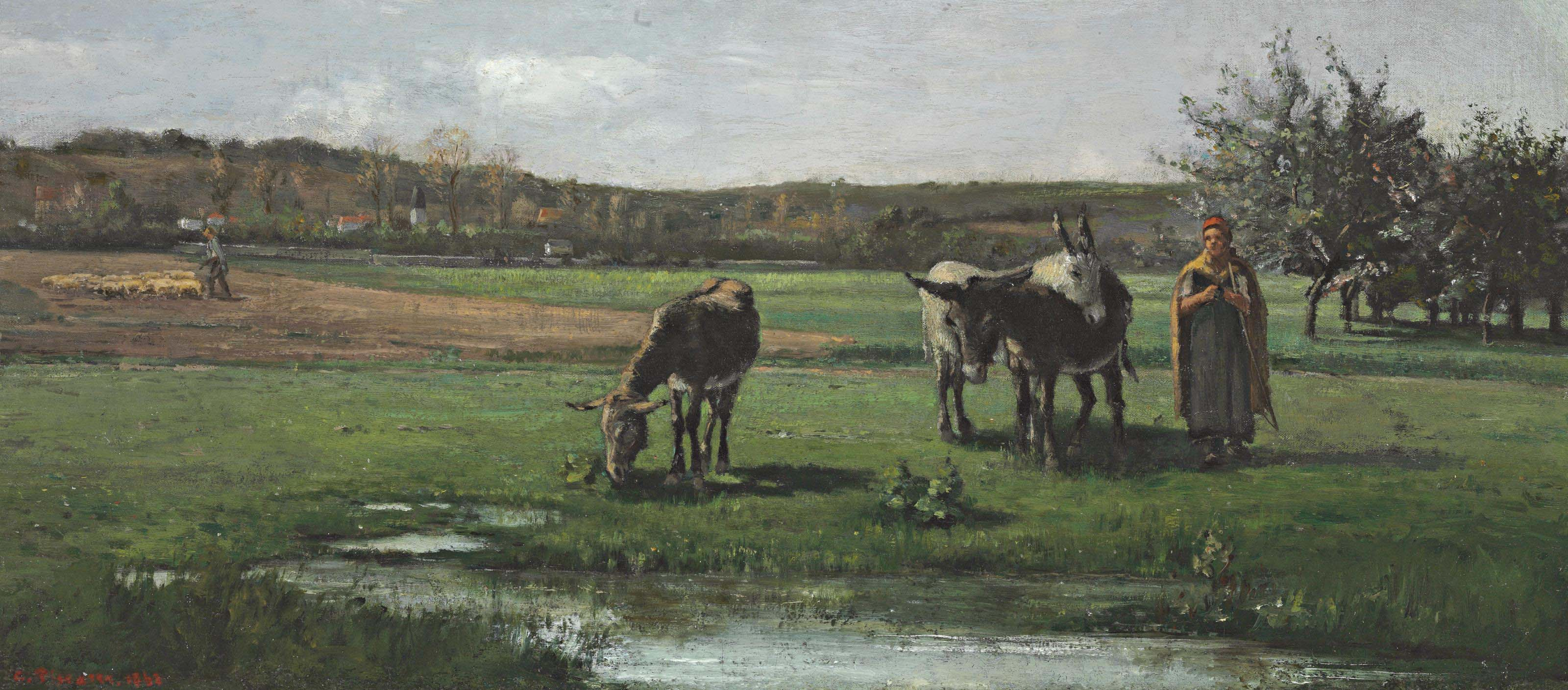
Camille Pissarro, nes au pâturage (1862).

As observed by Sylvie H. Brunet, the donkey is "overrepresented" in French proverbs and sayings. For instance, it is the most frequently mentioned animal in Ardèche proverbs, surpassing the wolf in frequency. Michel Pastoureau observes that in both Latin and the vernacular languages that succeeded it, numerous proverbs, puns, expressions, and insults highlight the foolishness and stubbornness of the donkey, originating from antiquity and still in use in the 21st century.

==== Symbol of foolishness ====
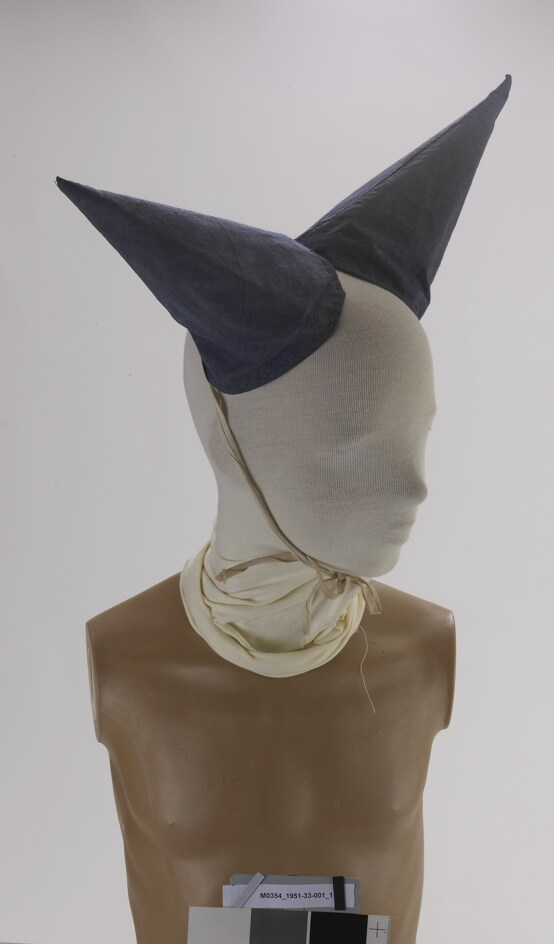
Dunce cap on display at the Departmental Museum of Popular Arts and Traditions, Château de Champlitte (Haute-Saône).

In his 1881 work Faune populaire de la France, Eugène Rolland dedicates approximately fifty pages to the donkey. He notes that the animal is often associated with stupidity and ignorance. This is evidenced by the use of the term "donkey" to describe someone who is unintelligent or lacks education. The phrase "donkey-like foolishness" is also used to convey this idea. At the time, it was common practice in France to punish students who were perceived to be lazy by forcing them to wear a dunce cap and threatening that they would grow donkey ears if they did not work harder. Rolland cites several dozen proverbs or sayings that emphasize this symbolic aspect of the donkey. For example, something that is despised is said to be "not worth the fart of a dead donkey" or that it is "not worth the skin of a donkey." René Volot notes that the donkey is associated with the scapegoat and the fool who believes the moon has fallen into the water upon seeing its reflection, both in a pedagogical text by Claude Augé and in a Cévenol tale.

In 1876, Charles-Alexandre Perron included two proverbs from Franche-Comté in his compilation of French proverbs: Quand le foin manque au râtelier, les ânes se battent (When hay is lacking in the manger, the donkeys fight), and Un âne court au chardon et laisse la bonne herbe (A donkey runs to the thistle and leaves the good grass).

The 1932-1935 edition of the French Academy Dictionary cites the proverb: À laver la tête d'un More, à laver la tête d'un âne, on perd sa lessive, which can be translated as "one takes great pains in vain to make a man understand something beyond his reach or to correct an incorrigible man." In Rouergue and Gard, two proverbs in Occitan say that les petites mouches font regimber les gros ânes (small flies make big donkeys balk).

Michel Pastoureau notes that Buridan's donkey paradox, which dies of hunger and thirst between a bucket of water and a bucket of food due to indecision, gave rise to the proverbial expression être comme l'âne de Buridan (To sit on the fence), though "it would be absurd to believe that, placed in such a situation, an animal or a human being could let themselves die of hunger or thirst."

==== Other proverbs and sayings ====
The French idiom faire tourner quelqu'un en bourrique signifies the act of tormenting and exhausting someone. Additionally, numerous sayings and tales underscore the donkey's vengeful nature. In several French regions, a prevalent tradition holds that it is considerably more perilous to fall from a donkey than from a horse. In the Pyrenean foothills, the month of May, which is observed as the month of souls, is regarded as the donkey's month.

In 1853, Pierre-Alexandre Gratet-Duplessis, a bibliophile, cited the saying Amour apprend les ânes à danser (Love makes donkeys able to dance) in La Fleur des proverbes français. He specified that "love-struck donkeys remain donkeys." Other traditions praise the donkey's laborious courage, such as "no one knows better than the donkey where the saddle sore is". In the Auvergne region, a proverb states "in the absence of oxen, plow with a donkey". Additionally, some proverbs praise the donkey's patience.

A frequently used expression can suggest a certain cunning in the donkey, or at least in the person imitating it for benefits. The expression "to play the donkey to get bran", likely originated with Rabelais in Gargantua, where it is written "gargantua played the donkey to get bran" (bran being husk).

Specific faults are associated with certain coat colors of the donkey, as evidenced by the adage "as wicked as a red donkey". This saying is attested in French, Norman, and the Creuse. In Languedoc and Aude, the black donkey is reputed to be mean, bad, and stubborn.

=== Popular songs and nursery rhymes ===
The donkey is referenced in French popular songs and nursery rhymes, including Le Testament de l'âne in Eure-et-Loir, L'âne mangé au moulin (featuring a girl named Margoton or Marianne), L'âne et le Loup, and Notre âne, a nursery rhyme whose first verse in a known variant begins as follows:

Notre âne, nôtre âne
A bien mal à la têt'
Madame lui fit faire
Un bonnet pour ses fêt'
Un bonnet pour ses fêt'
Et des souliers lilas, la-la
Et des souliers lilas.

Translation:

Our donkey, our donkey
Has a bad headache
Madame made it make
A cap for his parties
A cap for his parties
And lilac shoes, la-la
And lilac shoes.

=== Tales and legends ===
The donkey is a prominent figure in French folklore, often depicted in opposition to the horse. According to a Breton dualistic popular tale, God created the horse, while the Devil created the donkey. In Rouergue, a tale compares the horse and the donkey, with the former deriding the latter for its inferiority. This confrontation between horse and donkey is also evident in La Fontaine's 1668 fable Le Mulet se vantant de sa généalogie, as well as in Barthélemy Imbert's 1773 fables, where the horse represents the aristocracy and the donkey the working class.

According to a Nivernais legend, it was the donkey that taught humans to prune vines. The animal had nibbled on vine pieces to feed itself during winter, and the vineyard owners observed in the spring that the plant had grown back more vigorously.

==== Symbol of piety ====
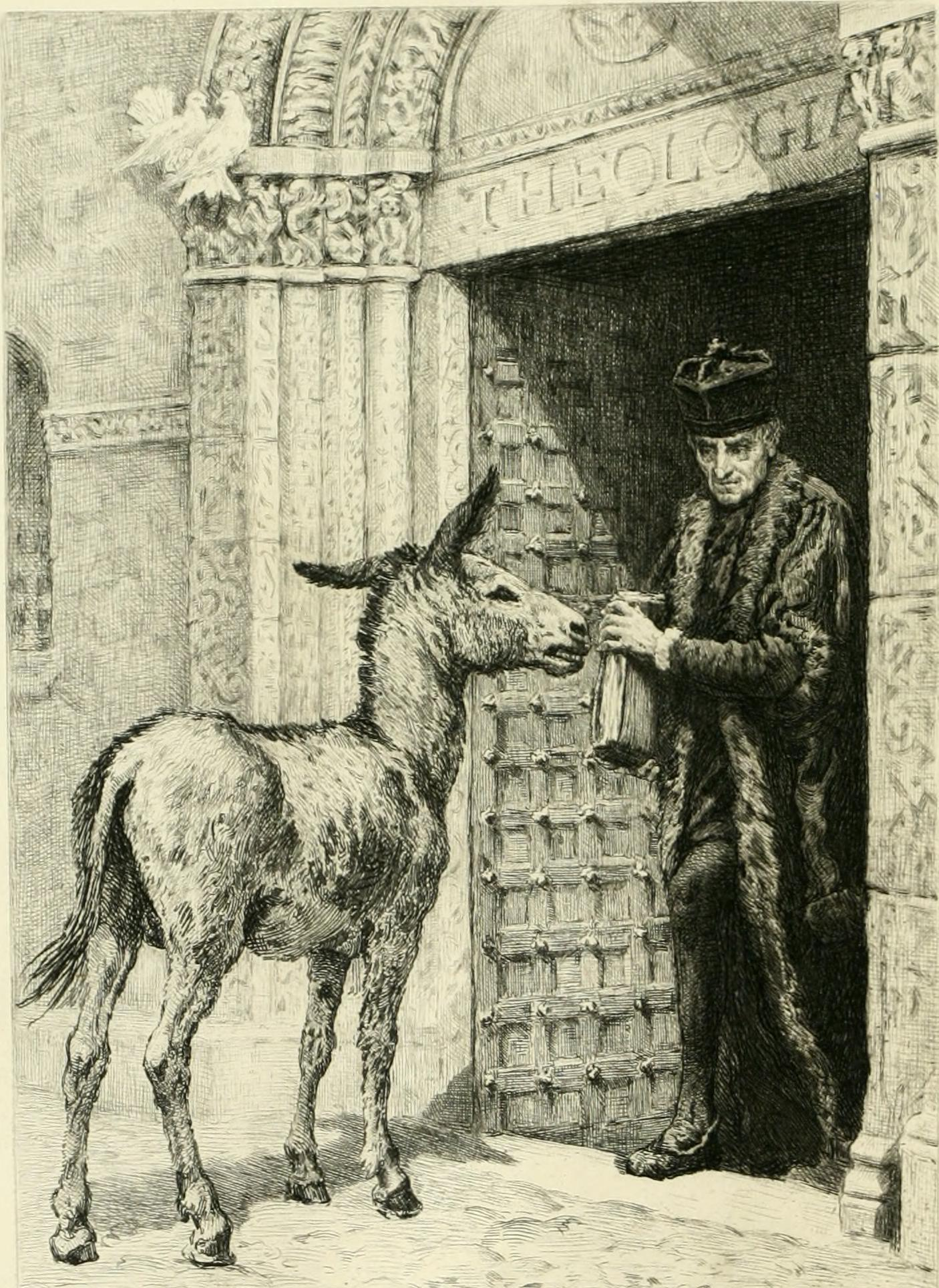
Illustration of the piety and pity of the donkey. Le pape - La pitié suprême - Religions et religion - L'âne, published by Émile Testard (1888).

The donkey is also presented as a pious animal in several traditions. In a Basque tale, for instance, it asks the wolf who just captured it to let it hear a mass before dying. Several French traditions emphasize that its back is marked with a cross, which is interpreted as a sign given in reward for the services it rendered to the Savior, protecting it from the Devil. In Berry, the fact that its hair is not tangled by elves, unlike horses', is explained by its role in the Nativity. In Le Folklore de France, Paul Sébillot notes that the medieval tale of the donkey thief forced to do penance gained some popularity, leading to various derivative tales, including a Burgundian version from the mid-18th century. He also notes a tradition, long since fallen into disuse by the late 19th century, that allowed donkeys to enter churches and recite ceremonial prose in their honor. In the Breton legend of Saint Envel, a donkey plays a pivotal role. After the wolf that had previously been his mount was eaten by the predator, Saint Envel forced the predator to serve as his mount.

==== Donkey's metamorphosis ====
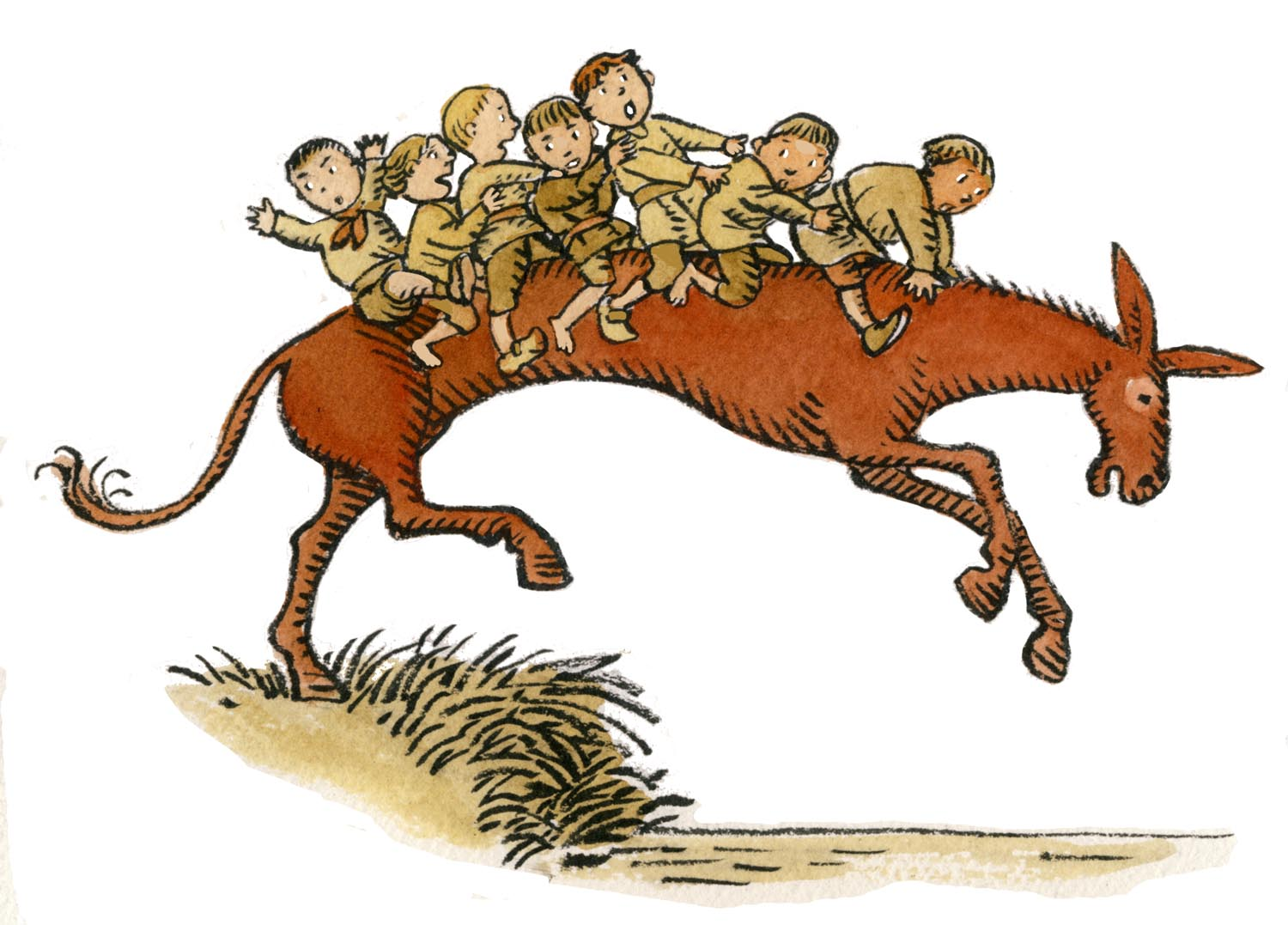
The Drac, in the form of a red donkey, will drown unwary children. Drawing by Jean-Claude Pertuzé (2010).

In Pyrenean folklore, the donkey is associated with the Drac, a shape-shifting demon that lures lost travelers to their demise by offering them a ride on its back. The Drac then drowns them in a torrent and sends them to hell.

According to Olivier de Marliave, the Drac appears as a large red donkey that emerges at night, often near a bridge. It can swell enormously to scare passersby and throw them into the river, where they drown. In other instances, the red donkey assumes a tranquil demeanor, with children ascending its back. Its body expands to accommodate a considerable number of children (typically seven), after which it leaps into the water of a pond or river, drowning them all. These legends were pervasive in Catalonia and Bigorre.

A similar legend is referenced in Pas-de-Calais by Claude Seignolle in Les Évangiles du Diable. A gray donkey appeared in Vaudricourt's square during Midnight Mass and permitted children fleeing the church to ride on its back, extending its body to accommodate twenty of them. When the mass concluded, it accelerated and plunged into a watering trough, drowning all of its passengers. Since that time, the creature reappears every Christmas night, bearing the souls of the damned, traversing the village, returning to its starting point at midnight, and entering the aforementioned pond from which it emerged. Pierre Dubois references a similar account in La Grande Encyclopédie des fées, wherein the creature is described as a "magnificent white horse" that drowns its young riders in a bottomless pond.

Additionally, numerous French tales feature a character who claims to have been transformed into a donkey. One such tale,L' ne et le Fils du magicien, is set in Pontoise. In this narrative, two thieves steal a merchant's donkey while he is asleep on his way back from the fair. One of the thieves, having woken the merchant, convinces him that he is the donkey turned back into a man due to a spell. A comparable narrative is found in the Cévennes and the Southern Alps, where two thieves sever the rope of a donkey led by a peasant. One of them assumes the animal's role and claims to have been enchanted.

According to a Basque tale from La Rhune, a witch can assume the form of this animal. In another Basque tale, the sotré, a Vosges sprite, transforms a man who took his zucchetto into a donkey.

==== The donkey defecating gold ====
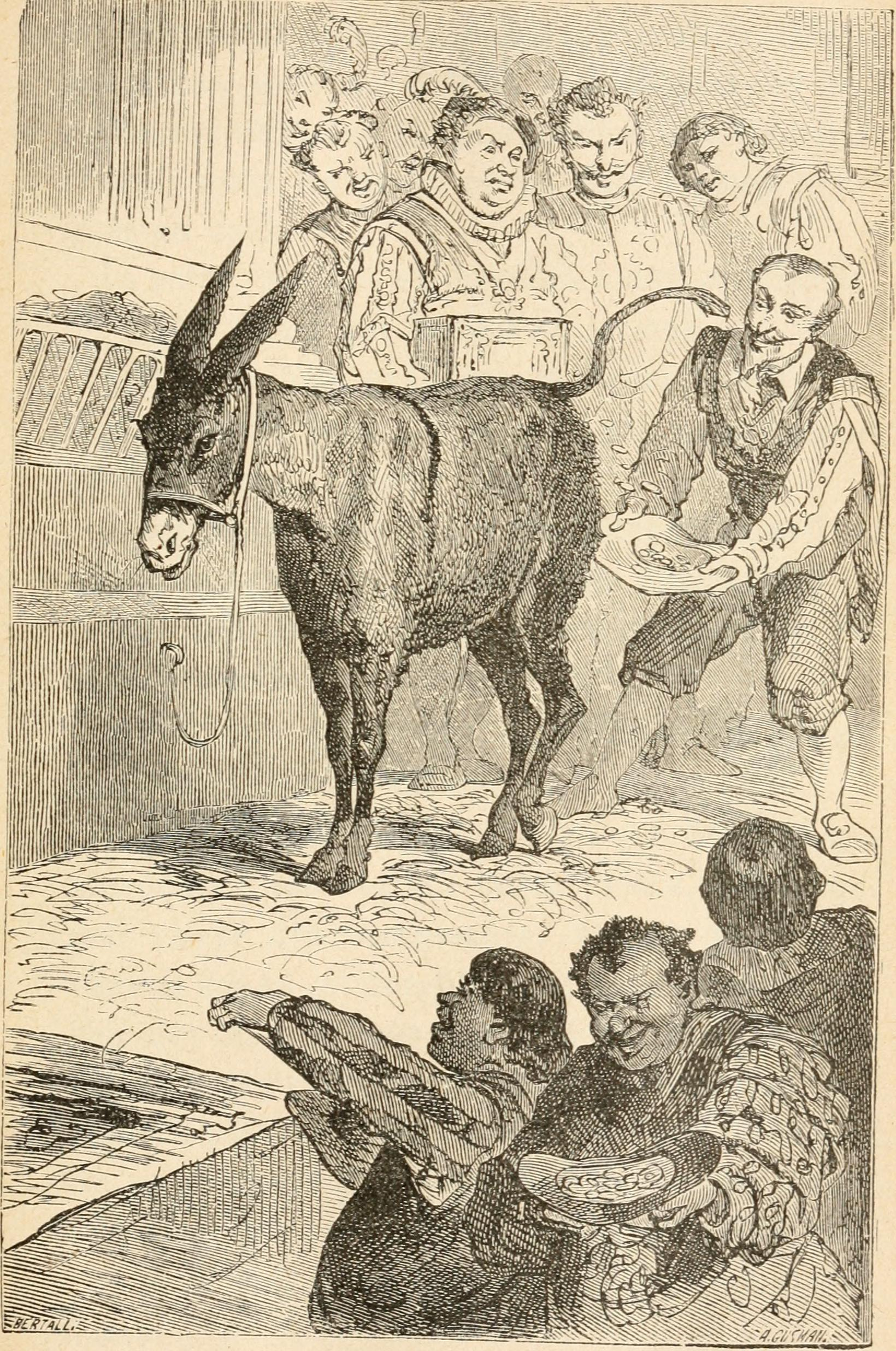
The donkey defecating gold, based on a 1908 illustration of the fairy tale Donkeyskin, collected and rewritten by Charles Perrault.

The donkey is also among the animals attributed with marvelous powers, notably that of defecating gold. This association with gold is unique to the donkey and the ram. In Contes et légendes des pays de France, Claude Seignolle collected two stories about donkeys that defecate gold: in the first story, the owner finds wealth, and in the second, the owner is ridiculed.

The most renowned French (and, more broadly, European) narrative featuring a donkey that defecates gold is Donkeyskin. As recounted by storyteller Michèle Bortoluzzi, "The tale of Donkeyskin was once so popular that people would refer to any fairy tale as 'a Donkeyskin tale.'" There are numerous versions of this tale, but it was not until the 16th century that the donkey assumed a significant role within it.

In this narrative, which originally revolved around the incest taboo, a king falls in love with his daughter and requests her hand in marriage. To avoid detection, she requests that the king kill the animal he holds most dear, his donkey that defecates gold. She then hides beneath the donkey's skin to flee the royal castle. Claude Mettra posits that “the central figure of the narrative is the donkey, which transforms manure into gold. Upon being skinned, the donkey will eternally watch over the young girl, whose grace will make gold a sparkling symbol of love.”

==== The donkey's egg ====
According to René Volot, there are approximately fifty versions of the tale of the donkey's egg in France, with half of these originating from Occitania. In the most prevalent version of this tale, a somewhat foolish teenage boy from the Cévennes is sent to work as a farmhand in Gard. As a reward for his labor, the farm owner presents him with a large gourd, a vegetable the boy has never encountered before. Upon inquiring about the nature of the object, the farmer reveals that it is a donkey's egg and that his mother will be able to guide its utilization. On his return journey, the boy experiences a loss of balance, resulting in the squash rolling downhill and into a bush, where a hare emerges. Upon discovering the squash to be broken open, the boy experiences profound emotional distress, believing that he has lost the potential for a friendship with the donkey.

=== In French literature, television, and cinema ===
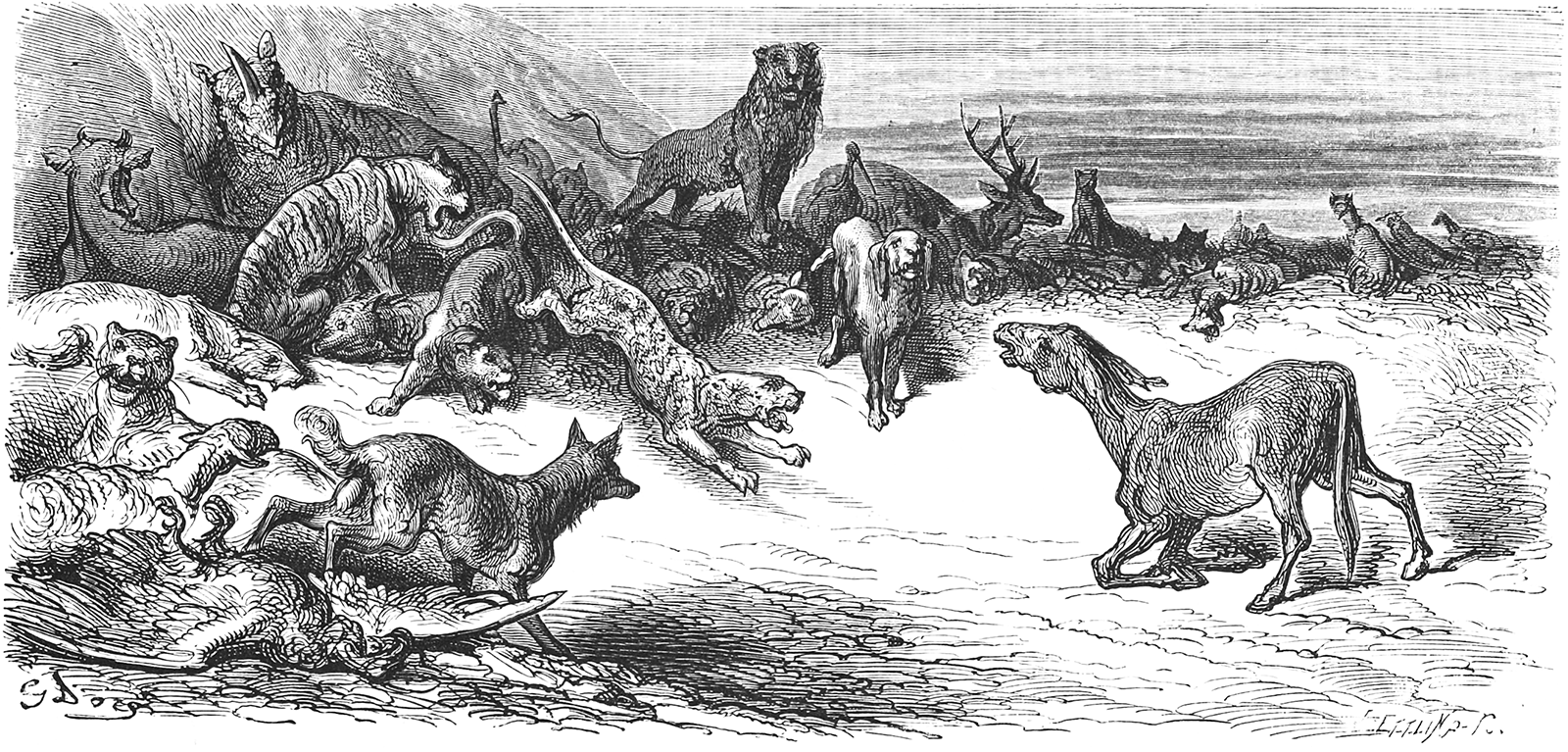
Gustave Doré's engraving for The Animals Sick of the Plague (1876).

Chambry highlights the enduring presence of the donkey in literary representations, dating back to the earliest translated texts in antiquity (the Bible, Aesop's fables, etc.) and continuing through classic authors (Jean de La Fontaine, Victor Hugo, Alphonse Daudet, etc.) to the present day, even though donkeys have disappeared from the daily lives of the French. While many of La Fontaine's fables mention the donkey, few make it a central figure. Chambry observes that one of the most illustrative fables of the donkey's symbolic role as a victim is The Animals Sick of the Plague. The fable The miller, his son and the donkey portrays a wise and passive donkey.

In his lengthy philosophical poem, L' ne, Victor Hugo personifies patience through the character of the donkey. The donkey also features Les Contes du chat perché (1934-1946) by Marcel Aymé, a collection of short stories set on a traditional farm. Joseph Kessel, a French novelist, published Le Petit ne blanc in 1973, a children's novel set in Tangier, Morocco.

Since 2000, French author and illustrator Bénédicte Guettier has published books about Trotro the donkey for very young children. These books illustrate small events, such as getting dressed or riding a bike, which have been adapted into various formats.

==== Mémoires d'un ân and its adaptations ====
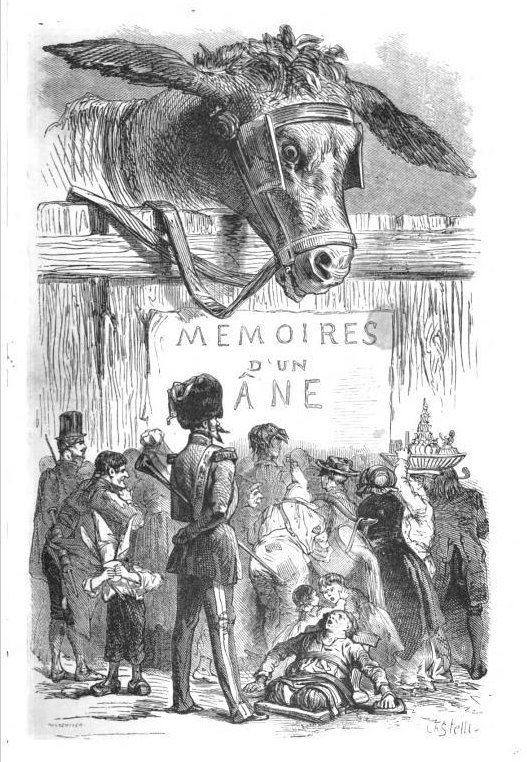
Illustration of Memoirs of a Donkey by Horace Castelli, 1869.

In 1860, Countess of Ségur published Mémoires d'un âne, an autobiographical account in which the donkey Cadichon recounts his adventures. According to Chambry's analysis, Cadichon serves as a model of virtue for young readers. He is humanized by his ability to speak and his act of repentance after seeking revenge on his various owners, yet he still reminds readers of his status as an enslaved animal to these same owners.

In 1960, Paul Ladmirault adapted the work for piano. An animated series adaptation, titled Cadichon, was broadcast on French television from 1986 onwards.

==== Travels with a Donkey in the Cévennes ====
Scottish novelist Robert Louis Stevenson undertook a journey with a donkey named Modestine through the Cévennes region of France, which he subsequently chronicled in his travelogue, Travels with a Donkey in the Cévennes. This travel literature was first published in English in 1879, but it was not until 1901 that it was translated into French. It was subsequently popularized by the Cévennes Club during its centenary celebrations.

This inspired the tourism development along the path Stevenson took, including donkey rental services. Annually, approximately six to seven thousand people hike this trail, with or without a donkey.

In 2020, the French film My Donkey, My Lover & I, selected for the Cannes Film Festival, drew inspiration from Stevenson's periplus. A donkey named Patrick participated in the filming and photo sessions.

==== L'Ane Culotte ====
Chambry cites Henri Bosco's 1937 novel L'Ane Culotte as an example of a work that is "impossible to overlook". She includes it among children's works that encourage their readers to mature. The novel is set in a small village in Provence, where a donkey regularly carries groceries for its master, dressed in pants on its front legs. The donkey plays a pivotal role in the narrative, initiating the protagonist on their rite of passage.

A television series adapted from this novel was broadcast on ORTF from 1967 onwards.

=== Donkey iconography ===
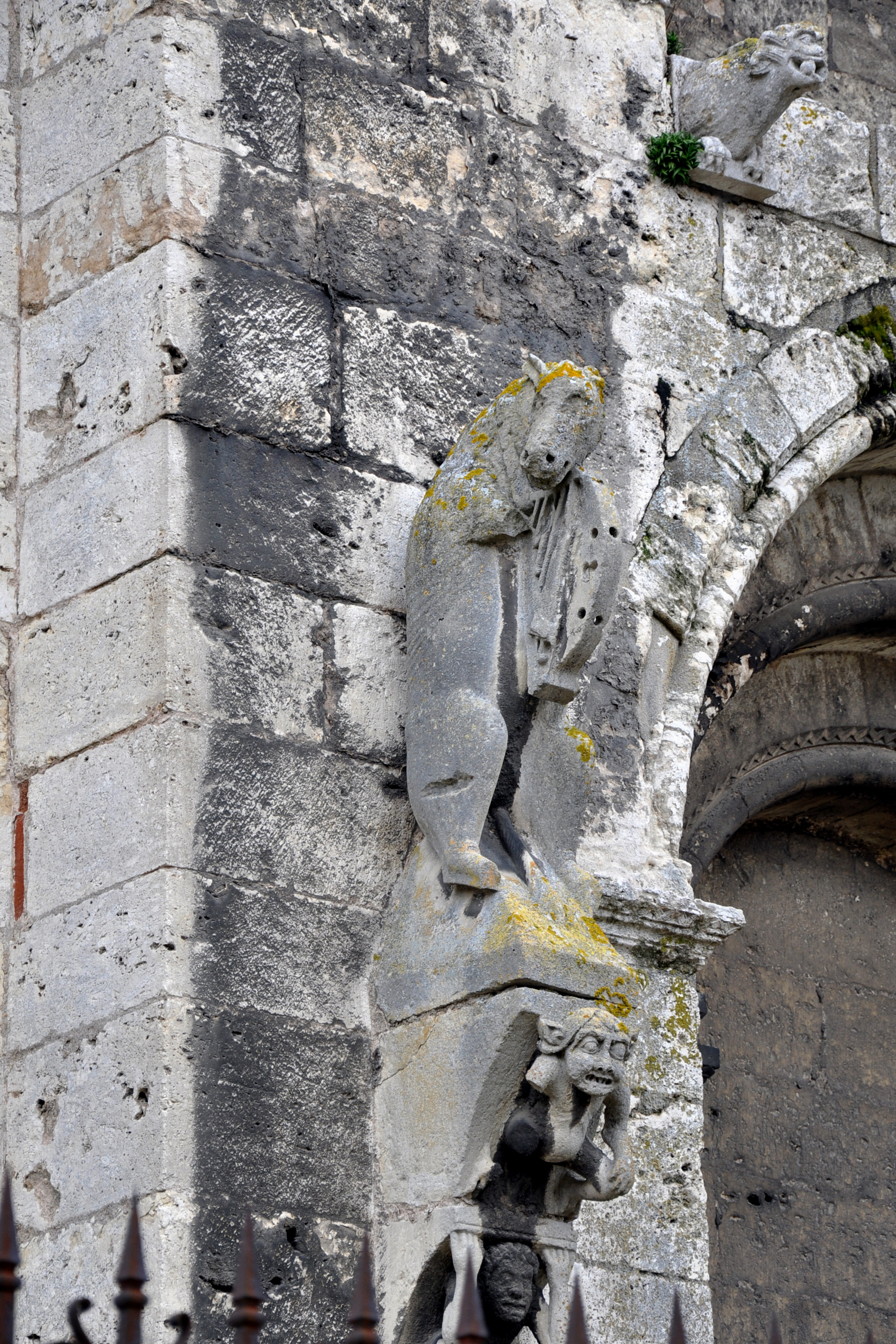
L'âne qui vielle, on Notre-Dame de Chartres cathedral.

The donkey has been a source of inspiration for a vast array of iconographic representations, spanning from medieval religious paintings to contemporary manifestations, such as graffiti. It has been employed in caricature creation, particularly those portraying Protestant ministers during the 18th century.

==== L'âne qui vielle ====
Claude Seignolle notes the statue of L'âne qui vielle, on the western door of Chartres Cathedral (a donkey standing on its hind legs playing the hurdy-gurdy or harp), as being as famous as Manneken Pis in Brussels. The theme of the musical donkey, illustrated by this sculpture, is already attested in the fables of Antiquity.

==== Joachim-Raphaël Boronali ====
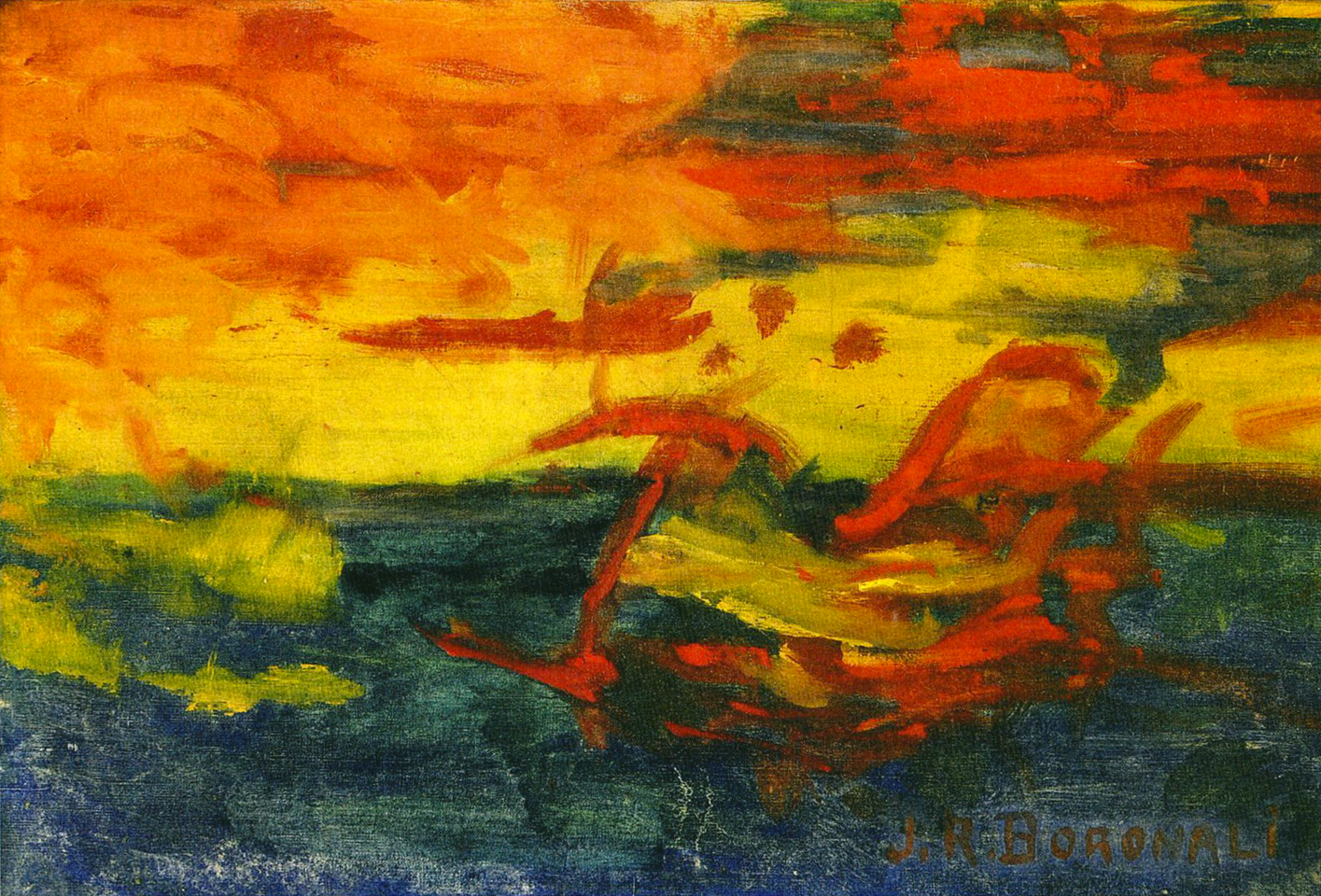
Et le soleil s'endormit sur l'Adriatique, painted in 1910 by the donkey Lolo.

The donkey is the subject of a celebrated French hoax from 1910, in which a landscape painting attributed to the artist Joachim-Raphaël Boronali (an anagram of Aliboron) was exhibited. The painting, titled Et le soleil s'endormit sur l'Adriatique, was accompanied by a "manifesto of excessivism". The canvas elicited diverse responses from art enthusiasts until Roland Dorgelès revealed that the painting was created by Lolo, the donkey belonging to the proprietor of the cabaret Au Lapin Agile, with a brush attached to its tail.

== See also ==
- List of French donkey breeds

== Bibliography ==
- Audiot, Annick; Garnier, Jean-Claude (1995). "De l'ân(e)onyme à l'hymne à l'âne ou le renversement de perspectives des usages sociaux de l'âne". Ethnozootechnie (in French) (56): 65–78. ISSN 0397-6572.
- Audiot, Annick (1995). Races d'hier pour l'élevage de demain (in French). INRA. ISBN 978-2-7592-0438-0. OCLC 1226323635.
- Bataillard, Charles (1873). L'Ane glorifié, l'Oie réhabilitée, les Trois Pigeons, l'École de village et l' ne savant (in French). Paris: Alphonse Lemerre library. Archived from the original on April 20, 2023.
- Bruneau, Roland (2005). "Les Équidés dans la Grande Guerre" (PDF). Bulletin de la Société française d'histoire de la médecine vétérinaire (in French). 4 (5): 20–33. Archived from the original on September 12, 2023.
- Chambry, Anne-Caroline (2003). L' ne, le Livre et l'Enfant : la représentation de l'âne dans la littérature enfantine (in French). Cheminements. ISBN 978-2-84478-221-2. Archived from the original on June 14, 2024.
- Lompech, Michel; Ricard, Daniel; Rieutort, Laurent (2018). "L'âne en France, ses usages et ses territoires". Géocarrefour. 92 (92/3). doi:10.4000/geocarrefour.11698. ISSN 1627-4873. Archived from the original on October 1, 2020.
- Lompech, Michel; Ricard, Daniel (2019). Quelles formes de présence asine en France ? (in French). French Horse and Riding Institute.
- Pastoureau, Michel (2008). "L'âne de Buridan". Les animaux célèbres (in French). Arléa. ISBN 9782869598270.
- Perron, Charles-Alexandre (2017). Proverbes de la Franche-Comté : études historiques et critiques (in French). Éditions des Régionalismes. ISBN 978-2-8240-5241-0. Archived from the original on August 2, 2023.
- Rolland, Eugène (1881). Faune populaire de la France, noms vulgaires, dictons, proverbes, contes et superstitions (in French). Maisonneuve & cie. Archived from the original on April 19, 2023.
- Sébillot, Paul (2018). Le Folklore de France : La Faune (in French). Éditions des Régionalismes. ISBN 978-2-36634-560-5. Archived from the original on May 8, 2023.
- Seignolle, Claude (2015a). Contes, récits et légendes des pays de France (in French). Vol. 1. Place des éditeurs. ISBN 978-2-258-13490-4. Archived from the original on April 15, 2023.
- Seignolle, Claude (2015). Contes, récits et légendes des pays de France (in French). Vol. 4. Place des éditeurs. ISBN 978-2-258-13493-5. Archived from the original on April 15, 2023.
- Volot, René (2001). L'esprit de l'âne : mythes, symboles, traditions (in French). Éditions Cheminements. ISBN 978-2-914474-11-5. Archived from the original on 2023-04-15.
