= List of French donkey breeds =

This is a list of the breeds of ass or donkey considered in France to be of French origin.

== Recognised breeds ==
- Âne Corse
- Baudet du Poitou
- Bourbonnais Donkey
- Cotentin Donkey
- Grand Noir du Berry
- Norman Donkey
- Provence Donkey
- Pyrenean Donkey

== Minor and extinct breeds ==
- Petit Gris du Berry
