= Coach driver =

Coach driver may refer to:

- A carriage driver or (dated) coachman, see also coach (carriage)
- A bus driver, see also coach (bus)
