= The Animals Sick of the Plague =

Fable in La Fontaine's Fables

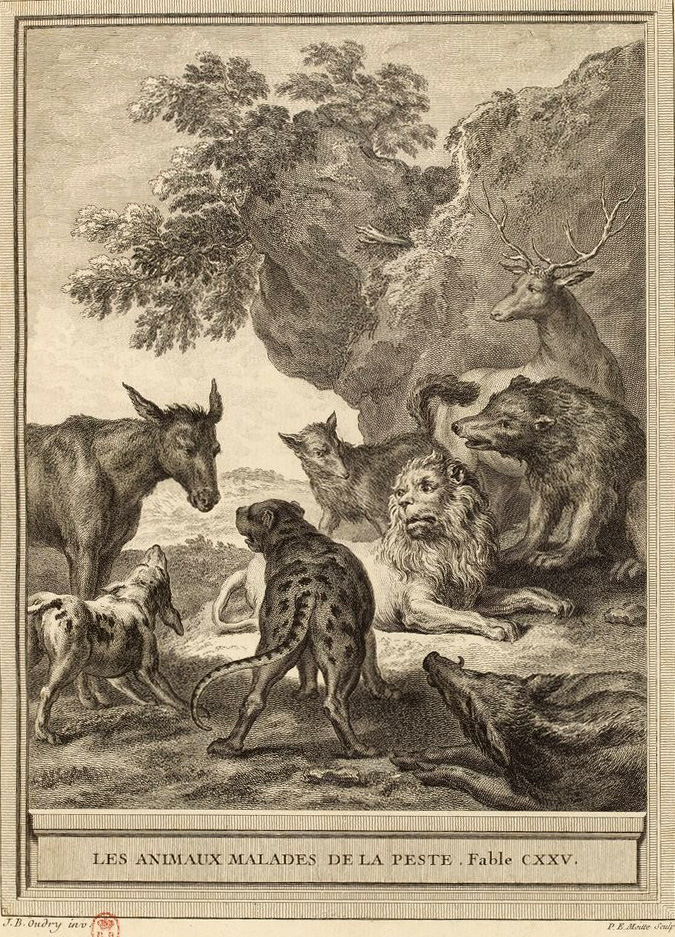
An engraving of Jean-Baptiste Oudry's illustration, showing the condemnation of the ass, 1755

The Animals Sick of the Plague (in French Les animaux malades de la peste) is a dark fable by Jean de la Fontaine about the inequality of justice. It was published in 1678 at the head of his second volume of Fables (VII.1) and is generally considered one of his best.

== Divine justice and partial judgment ==
A mortal plague has struck the animal kingdom and their ruler, the Lion, calls a general council to consider a remedy. Following a Classical precedent, the heavenly scourge requires an expiatory sacrifice and the Lion proposes a general confession to identify the culprit. He begins himself by confessing to killing lambs that have never harmed him and sometimes their shepherd as well. The Fox replies that this is a minor fault: the Lion confers honour on those he deigns to eat and punishes the shepherd for his human pride in believing himself chief of beasts. Taking heart, the Tiger, the Bear and other animals admit to similarly violent crimes. In the eyes of their consenting peers, such behaviour is all but saintly. Following them, the Ass relates how hunger once led him to snatch a bite of grass from a monastery meadow as he was passing and is immediately condemned for his double crime against property and religion.

From this story, La Fontaine draws the satirical conclusion that power, being reliant on property, makes victims of those without it: "Depending on your power or lack,/ Judgement will paint you white or black" - or, as a later English translator prefaced his own version of the fable, "The laws on little culprits fall;/ Great criminals escape them all."

== Sources ==
Commentators point out several similar stories to La Fontaine's fable in the century before he composed it. One of the earliest appears in a sermon of Jean Raulin (1443-1514) against ecclesiastical misuse of the sacrament of confession. The Lion, acting as confessor, absolves the Wolf and the Fox, but not the Donkey's encroachment on a monastic meadow. An Italian parallel appeared in The Facetious Nights of it: Giovanni Francesco Straparola (1553), where the Wolf, Fox and Ass are on their way to Rome to confess their sins but decide to save themselves the journey by a mutual confession. On hearing that the Ass once nibbled some straw from his master's shoes, his unforgiving companions devour him. Yet another version is told in the first book of emblems by fr:Guillaume Guéroult. There the Lion, as Father Confessor, excuses the crimes of the Wolf, but the two eat the Ass after his admission that he had eaten his master's straw sandals.

== Translations ==
A slightly expanded English version of La Fontaine's fable appeared a quarter century later in Bernard de Mandeville's misleadingly titled Aesop Dress’d (1704). It keeps La Fontaine's title of "The Plague among the Beasts", however, and the socio-economic focus of his moral: "The Fable shews you poor Folk's fate/ Whilst Laws can never reach the Great". The next appearance was the prose version in the Modern Fables section of Robert Dodsley's Select Fables of Esop and Other Fabulists (1761), in which once again the details are slightly altered. In this the animals, meeting in a general assembly, appoint the fox as father confessor "and the lion with great generosity condescended to be the first in making public confession", followed by "the Tyger, the Leopard, the Bear and the Wolf". But the Ass is condemned to be sacrificed in expiation for its sacrilegious mouthful of the parson's meadow "and the rest of the beasts went to dinner on his carcase".

La Fontaine's poem continued to be translated in later miscellanies of fables. Brooke Boothby condenses it in the second volume of his Fables and Satires (1809); George Linley the Younger also gives an abridged version in his Old Saws Newly Set (1864), but at the end draws out the social moral to some length:

In judging great and small transgressor,
We laud the large, condemn the lesser…
Stern Justice, blinking giant vices,
The petty culprit sacrifices.

Naturally, the fable also featured in translations of the complete fables that followed from the 19th century onwards. Among these may be mentioned the first U. S. collection in verse by Elizur Wright in 1841 and Frederick Colin Tilney's prose version in The Original Fables of La Fontaine (1913). Later complete collections in verse have contained notable translations by Marianne Moore and Norman R. Shapiro (1930-2020).

== Adaptations ==
There were also adaptations of La Fontaine's version of the fable that altered significant details of its plot. Jonathan Swift's extended and satirical "The Beasts' Confession to the Priest" (1732) was the most radical of these. There the Lion demands that all the beasts confess their sins to a priest, but as they do so each pleads underlying virtues: the wolf his basic harmlessness; the ass his wit and sweet voice; though the pig admits pride, it is in its moderate appetite; the ape argues its strict morality, the goat its chastity. Swift then compares this to the denial of their common reputations by lawyers, political and clerical place-seekers, doctors, statesmen and gamesters, concluding his satire by condemning fabulists for unrealistically endowing innocent animals with human characteristics. The main target of the satire is the individual capacity for self-delusion, which is contained in the work's sub-title, "on observing how most men mistake their own talents".

The start of Ivan Krylov's plague fable differs less widely from La Fontaine's, but at the end wolves are added to the Tiger and Bear as joining in confession. They are followed by an Ox who admits that five years past he had nibbled a whisp from a priest's haystack and for this impiety is condemned by the others as the real culprit. Krylov also shifts from emphasising lack of means in his conclusion; in the eyes of the world, he ends, "The man that's meekest is the man to blame".

== Illustrations ==
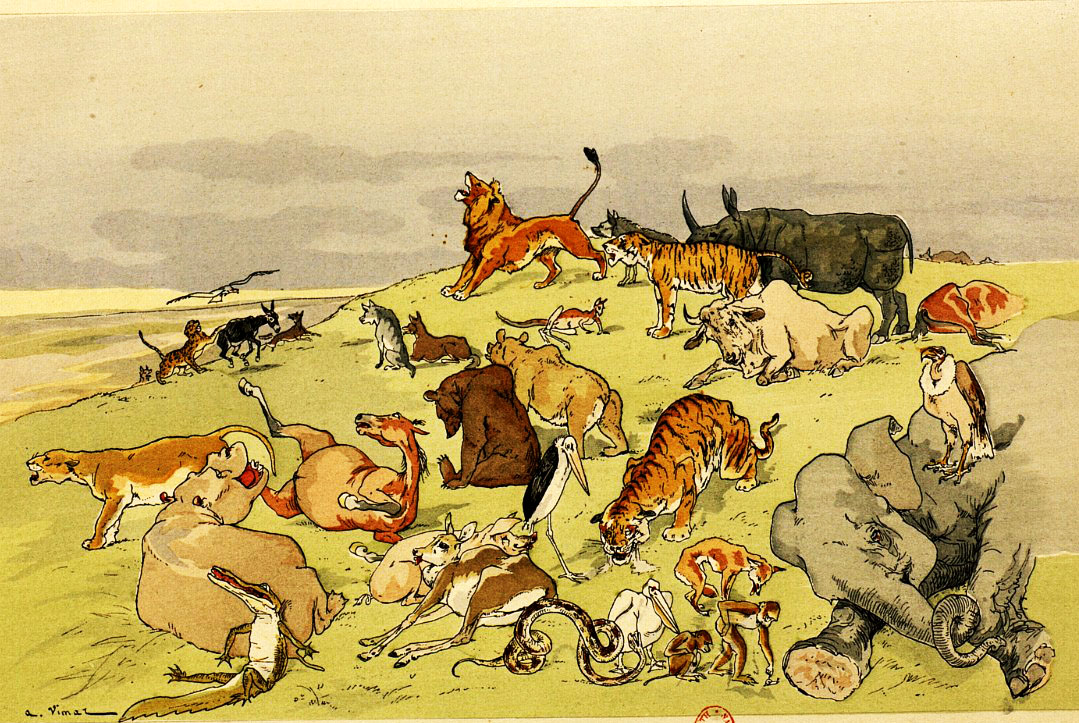
Auguste Vimar, Les animaux malades de la peste (1897)

Editions of the Fables were issued with individual illustrations of each, starting with those of François Chauveau in the 17th century and extending through engravings based on the work of such recognised masters as Jean-Baptiste Oudry in the 18th century and Gustave Doré in the 19th. The majority of these portray the apologetic ass facing a semicircle of hostile beasts. The same scene was also used by Charles Virion in his bronze medal of 1940.

A more exotic illustration is provided by the miniature commissioned from the Indian painter Imam Bakhsh Lahori (active 1825-45), now at the Musée Jean de La Fontaine. This shows the lion sitting in judgement and the slaughter of the ass, a theme pictured by later illustrators such as Jean Ignace Isidore Gérard Grandville. Grandville's print takes up the fable's satirical undercurrent of a corrupted society swayed by the powerful, in which the lion sits at ease in the court and the wolf is dressed in a prosecutor's robes, with a blind mole swinging a priestly censer at his side.

As the 20th century approached, Auguste Vimar (1851-1916) crammed his foreground with many additional animals from the tropics and relegated the attack on the condemned donkey to the background (see above). Salvador Dalí's lithograph of about 1974 takes its departure from another common theme of previous illustrators based on the fable's opening, with the animals collapsed on the ground, exhausted by the plague's attack, and here sprayed by a skeletal elephant. Later still, Yves Becquet (b.1944), an inhabitant of La Fontaine's birthplace, seizes on the fable's social message in his lithograph. Here the lion declaims from a political podium, guarded by a rank of uniformed security men and adulated by sycophantic supporters, condemning the violence of birds against worms. In the foreground the sick ass is receiving a blood transfusion.
