= Provence Donkey =

French breed of donkey

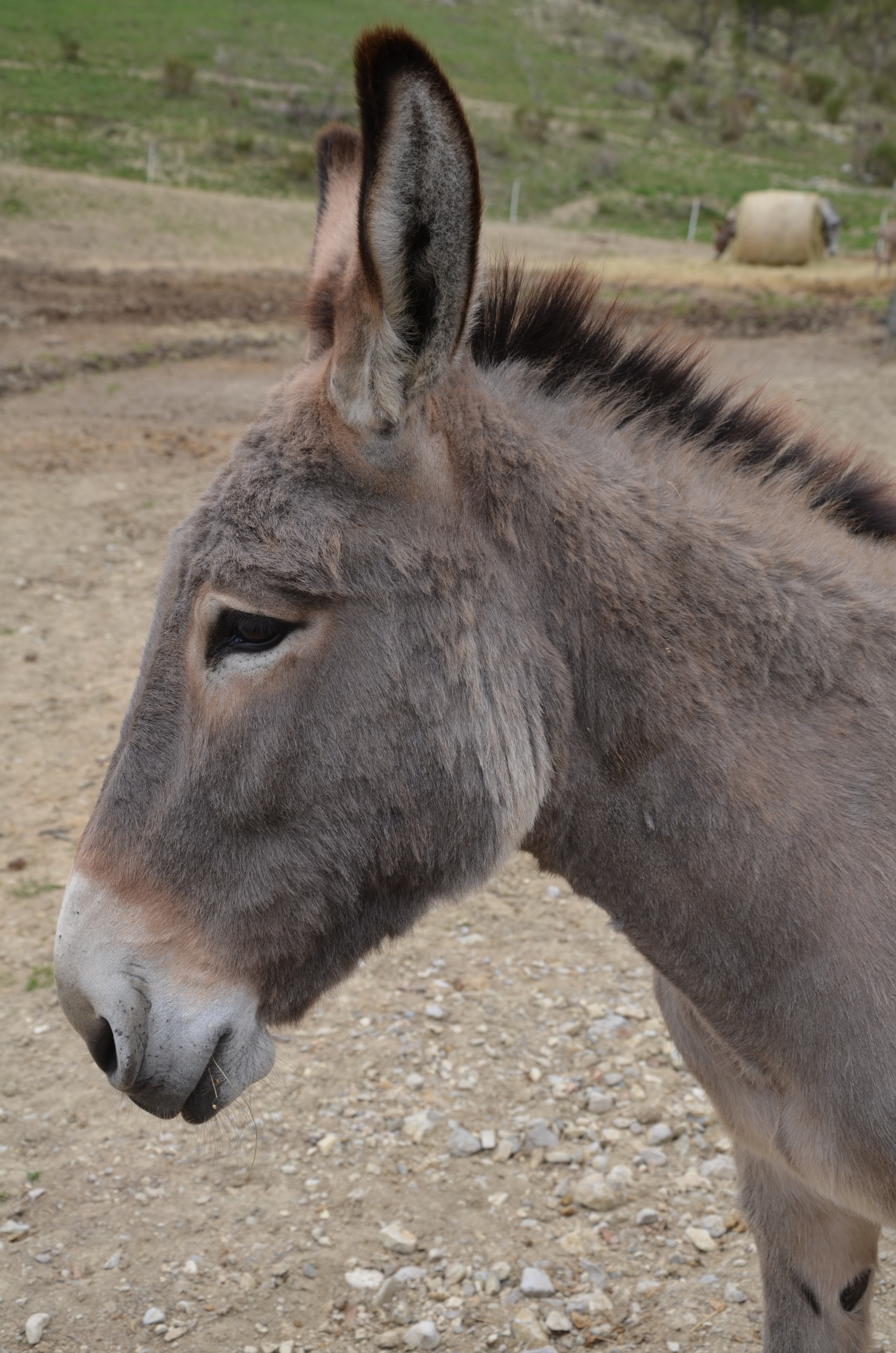
- Conservation status: FAO (2007): no data; SAVE (2008): endangered; DAD-IS (2026): endangered-maintained
- Other names: Âne d'Arles; Âne de berger; Âne de la Crau; Âne de Savoie; Âne de transhumance; Âne gris de Provence; Âne des Croisés; Âne des Saintes
- Country of origin: France
- Distribution: Provence; Rhône-Alpes
- Standard: Ministère de l'Agriculture

Traits
- Height: Male: 1.20–1.35 m (47–53 in); Female: 1.17–1.30 m (46–51 in)
- Coat: dove-grey with pink lights

The Provence Donkey or French: Âne de Provence is a French breed of domestic donkey originating in the historical province of Provence, in south-eastern France. It is distributed through much of central and south-eastern France, with the highest concentration in Provence and the Rhône-Alpes region. It was traditionally used by transhumant shepherds of the area as a pack animal in the seasonal movement of flocks of sheep between their summer pastures on the high Alps of Haute-Provence and the Dauphiné and their winter grounds in Basse-Provence.

== History ==
The earliest records of the use of donkeys by shepherds in Provence are from the fifteenth century. During the seasonal transhumance between the low ground where the sheep over-wintered and the high alpine pastures where they spent the summer months, donkeys were used as pack animals. They carried – on specially adapted pack-saddles – the equipment and supplies needed by the shepherds along the journey. The area of origin of the Provençal breed appears to coincide exactly with the area – consisting of Provence and parts of Savoie and the Ardèche – where transhumant sheep-farming was traditional.

Following the mechanisation of transport in the twentieth century, first by rail and then by road, breed numbers declined at an alarming rate. At the end of the nineteenth century, a census in the départements of Provence recorded 13000 head; in 1956 the number had fallen to around 2000, and by 1993 no more than 330 could be identified.

A breeders' association, the Association de l'Âne de Provence, was formed in December 1992, and worked with the Haras Nationaux (the national stud) of Uzès, in Languedoc-Roussillon, to achieve recognition of the breed. A stud-book was opened in December 1995, and in November 2002 the breed was formally recognised by the Ministère de l'agriculture, de l'alimentation, de la pêche et des affaires rurales, the French ministry of agriculture. A total population of 1630 head was reported for 2021; in 2025 the conservation status of the breed was listed as "at risk/endangered".

== Characteristics ==
At three years old, jacks stand approximately 1.20–1.35 m at the withers, and jennies some 1.17–1.30 m.

The coat is dove grey, varying from pale to dark, with pinkish lights. The muzzle and surround of the eyes are pale; the forehead and ears usually have a russet tint. There is a well-marked darker dorsal stripe and shoulder-stripe, together forming a cross – the croix de St. André; the legs may show zebra-striping. The limbs are solid and the hooves relatively large.

== Use ==
The donkeys are still used in transhumance by some shepherds. The Provence Donkey is suitable as a pack animal, for light driving and for riding. Its character and sure-footedness even on broken ground make it suitable for trekking. It may be used in vegetation management, for brush clearance to reduce fire risk.

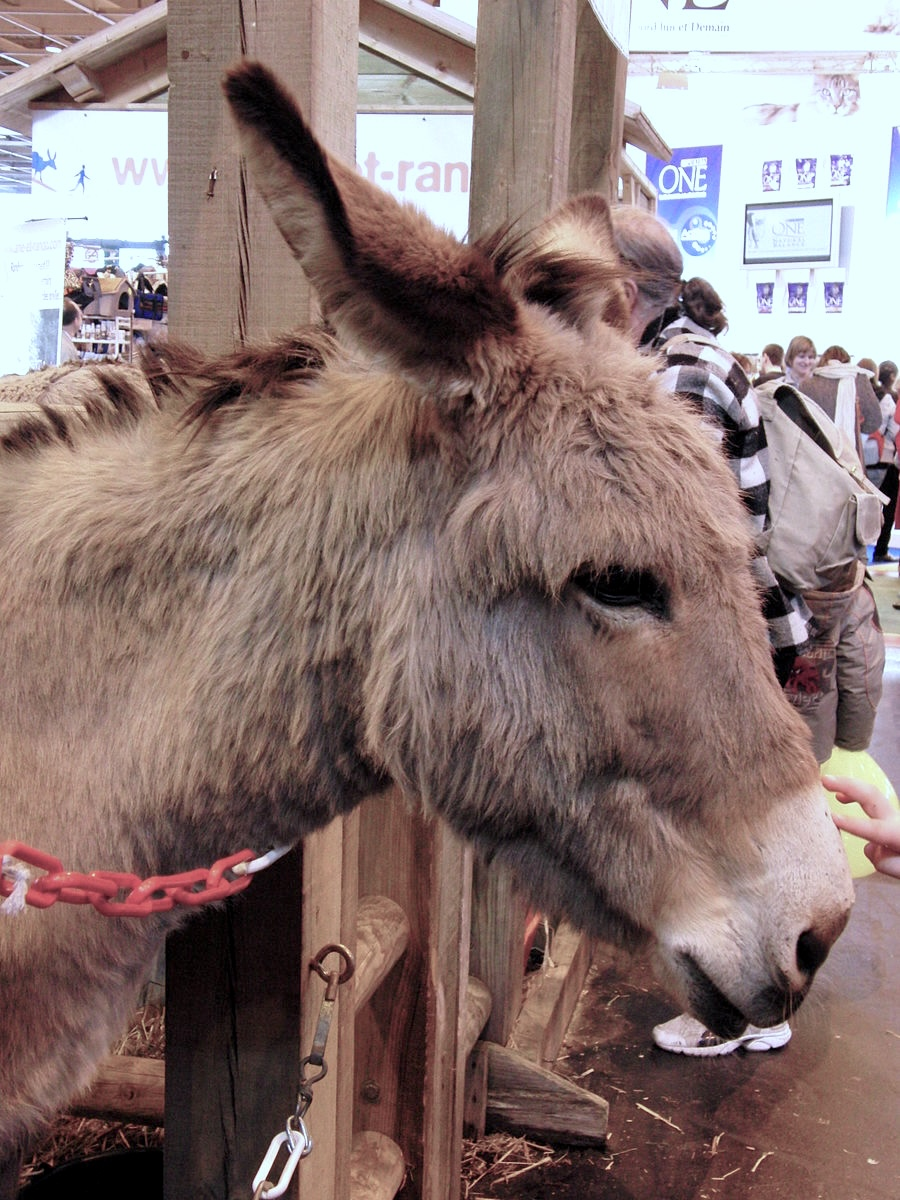

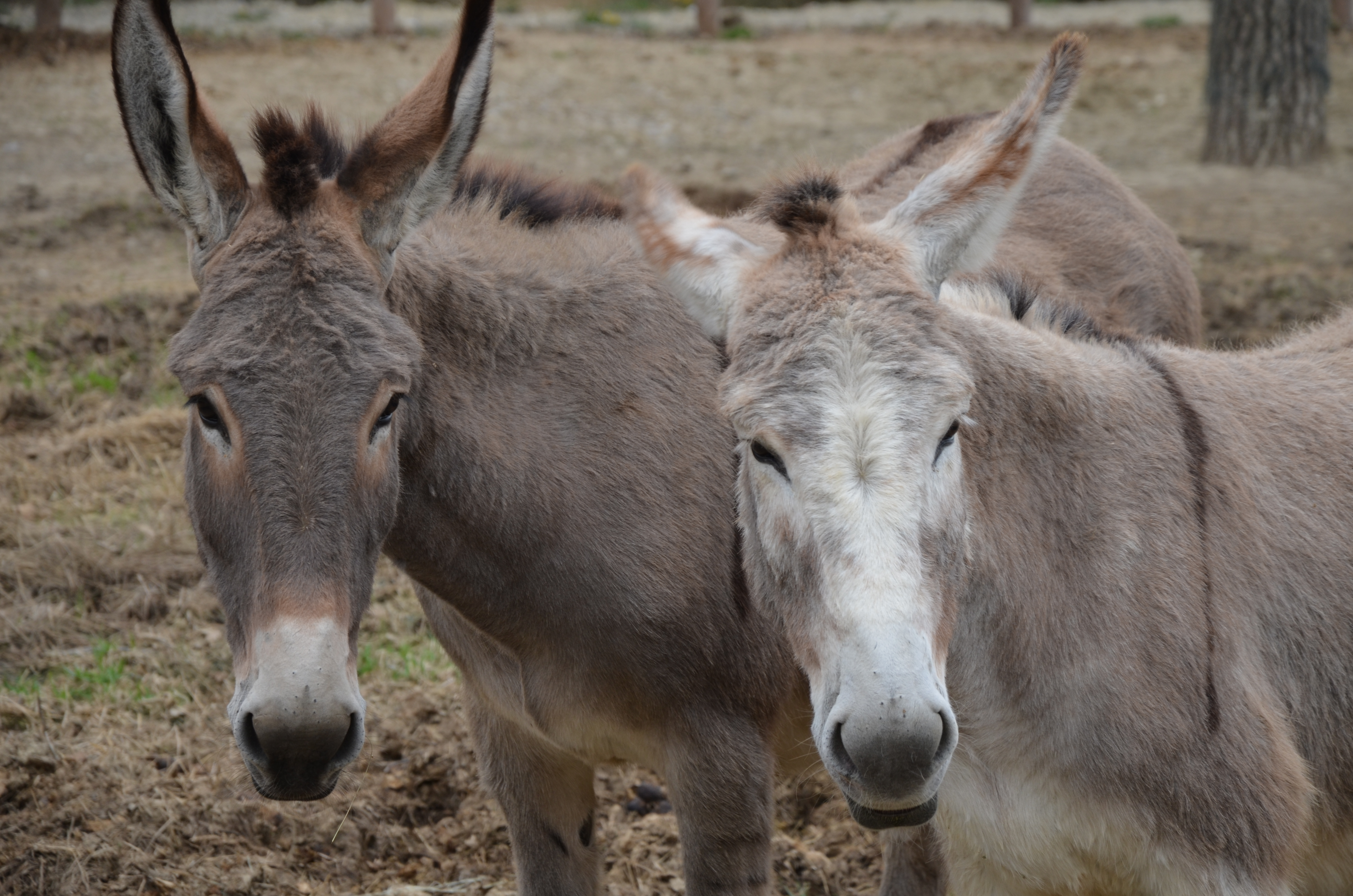
Colour variation

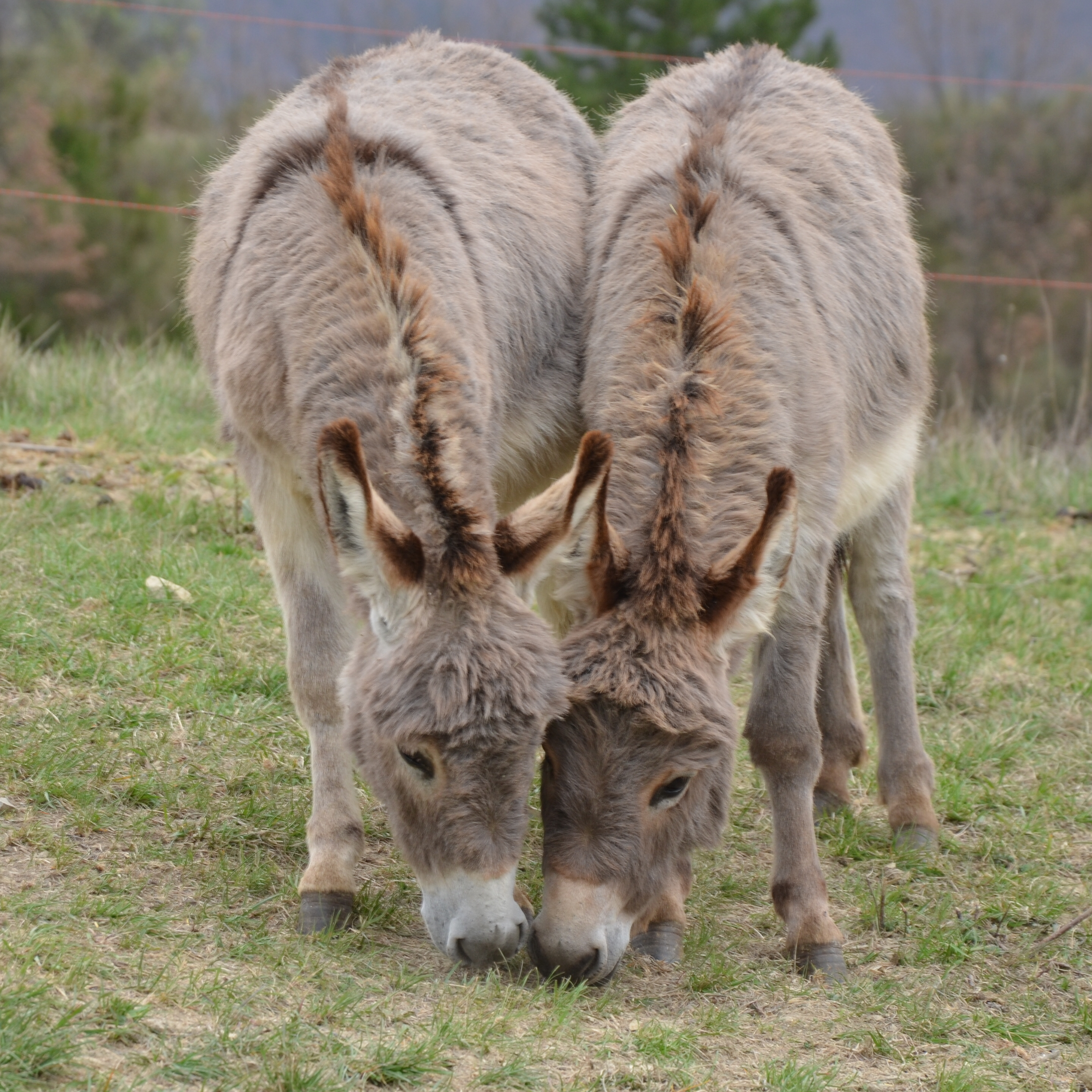
Dorsal stripe and cross
