= Grand Noir du Berry =

Breed of donkey

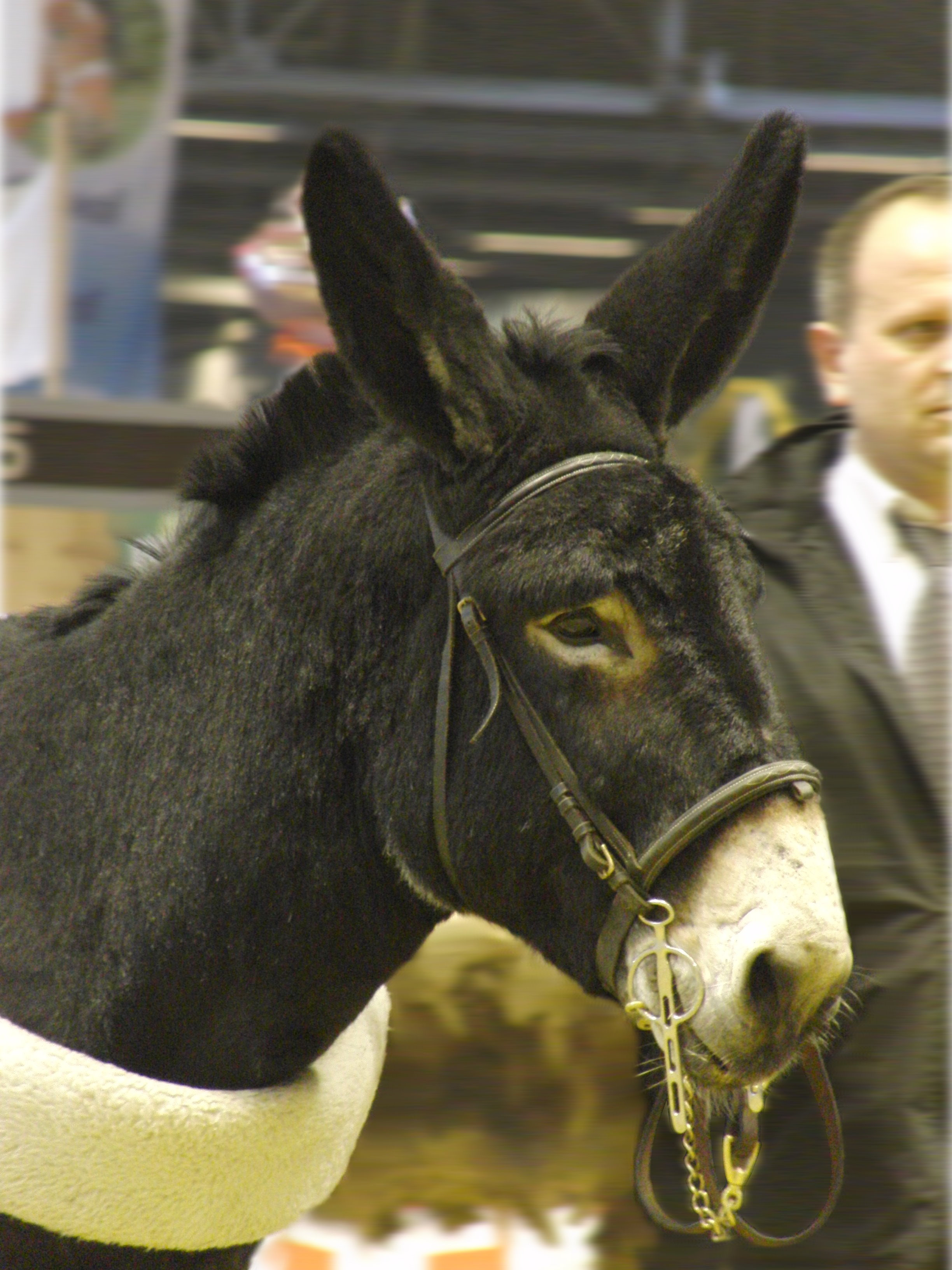
- Conservation status: FAO (2007): no data; SAVE (2008): endangered
- Country of origin: France
- Distribution: central and northern France
- Standard: Ministère de l'Agriculture

Traits
- Height: Male: 1.35–1.45 m; Female: minimum 1.30 m
- Coat: black, black pangaré

The Grand Noir du Berry, French: Âne grand noir du Berry, is a breed of domestic donkey from the historic region of Berry, in central France. It is particularly associated with the town of Lignières and neighbouring areas of the départements of Cher and Indre. It is found mostly in those départements and in those of Nièvre and Allier, but is distributed through much of central and northern France. It was in the past used both for in agricultural work, particularly in vineyards, and for barge haulage on the canals of the area. The breed was recognised by the Ministère de l'Agriculture, the French ministry of agriculture, in 1994. The stud book is kept by the breeders' association, the Association Française de l'Âne Grand Noir du Berry.

== History ==
The origins of the Grand Noir du Berry are unknown. It has been variously suggested that it was influenced by imports of donkeys from Algeria in the 1850s, or that it descends from Catalan donkeys brought to the area by itinerant Romani people. From the early twentieth century onwards there is ample documentation in photographs of its use in agriculture, in harness and for barge haulage. A breeders' association, the Association Française de l'Âne Grand Noir du Berry, was formed in 1993 and in January 1994 the breed was officially recognised by the agriculture ministry and the Haras Nationaux. The association maintains the stud book for the breed.

In 1994 there were 100 animals registered in the stud book; the current population is about 1300.

== Characteristics ==
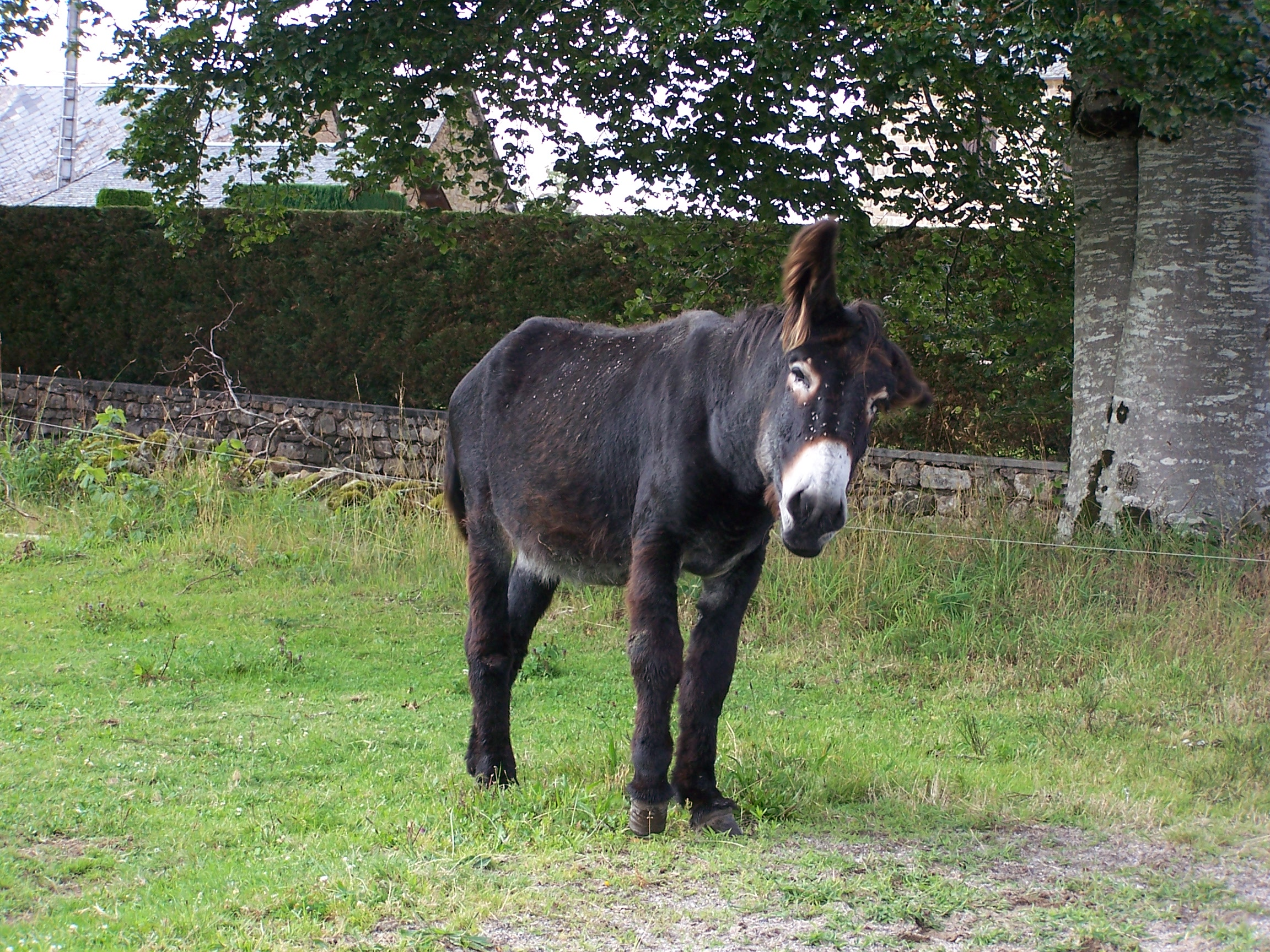
A Grand Noir du Berry donkey

Grand Noir du Berry jacks measure 1.35–1.45 metres (53–57 in), and jennies a minimum of 1.30 m (51 in) The coat is black, with or without pangaré markings. There is no dorsal stripe, shoulder-stripe or zebra-striping of the legs. The lower part of the muzzle is pale grey, as is the belly.

== Use ==
The Grand Noir du Berry was in the past used in agricultural work, particularly in vineyards, and for light agricultural draught work; from about 1850 it was also used to draw barges on the Canal de Berry and other canals of the region, work that had previously been done by men. Today it may be used as a pack animal for hiking or trekking, or for recreational driving; jacks may be used to sire mules.
