= Claude Seignolle =

French author (1917–2018)

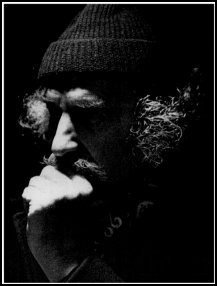
Claude Seignolle

Claude Seignolle (25 June 1917 – 13 July 2018) was a French author. His main interests were folklore and archaeology before he turned to fiction. He also wrote under the pseudonyms 'Starcante', 'S. Claude' and 'Jean-Robert Dumoulin'.

== Early and later life ==
At the age of twelve his family moved to Chatenay-Malabry and he went to school at Lakanal high school in Sceaux where his history teacher encouraged his interests in archaeology. He was expelled from this school for absenteeism.

He later joined the French Prehistoric Society, where he met the renowned folklorist Arnold Van Gennep. With his brother Jacques, Claude toured Hurepoix for two years collecting folklore and legends, and in 1937 he co-wrote with his brother The Folklore of Hurepoix, which was praised by Pierre Mac Orlan and Blaise Cendrars. In 1945 he published his first novel Le Rond des sorciers.

He lived in the liberation St. Montaine, still in Sologne, where he collected local folklore and stories that inspired several of his books. Seignolle wrote several books of supernatural horror, including The Accursed. He is considered by some to be one of the best French fantasists; Lawrence Durrell has written of Seignolle: "The devils, the werewolves and the vampires...appear in his novels as disturbing realities, and the attitude he adopts towards them is so matter-of-fact that the reader rapidly finds himself believing in them...." Horror historian R.S. Hadji included Seignolle on his list of the greatest horror writers.

He turned 100 in June 2017 and died in July 2018 at the age of 101.

== Awards ==
In November 2008 he received the Prix Alfred Verdaguer from the French Academy.

A literary prize bearing his name recognizes the works relating to French folklore. It is awarded annually since 2004, in Épinal, at the Festival Imaginales.

== Bibliography of works in English ==
- Man with Seven Wolves, The Child's World (Minn.), 1992 (novel, with Jacqueline Kergueno)
- The Accursed, George Allen & Unwin Ltd. (London), 1967 (two novellas)
- The Nightcharmer: And Other Tales, Texas A&M University Press (College Station, Texas), 1983 (stories)
- The Black Cupboard, Ex Occidente (Bucharest, Romania), 2010 (novella)
