= Carriage driving =

Form of competitive horse driving in harness with two or four wheeled carriages

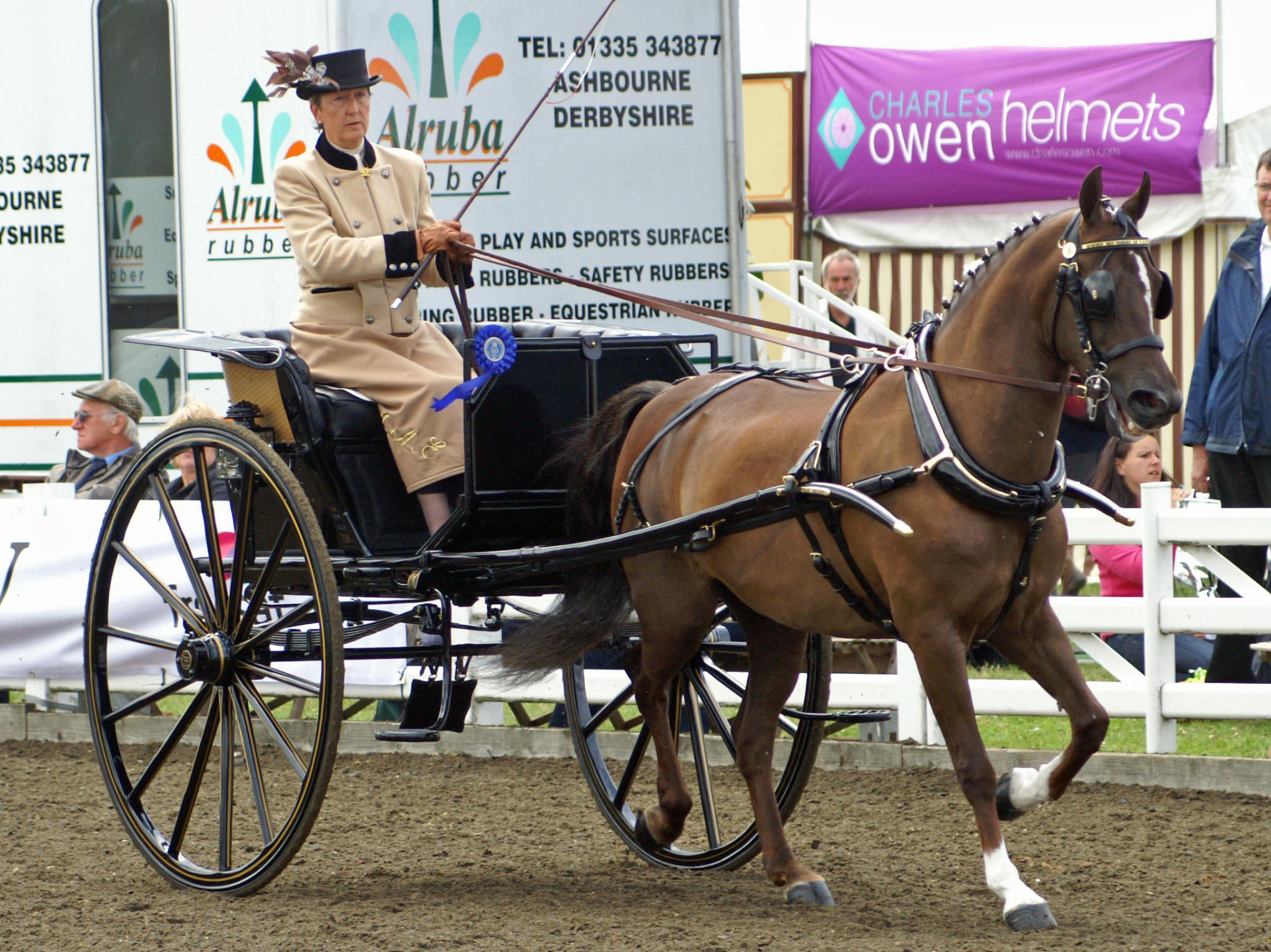
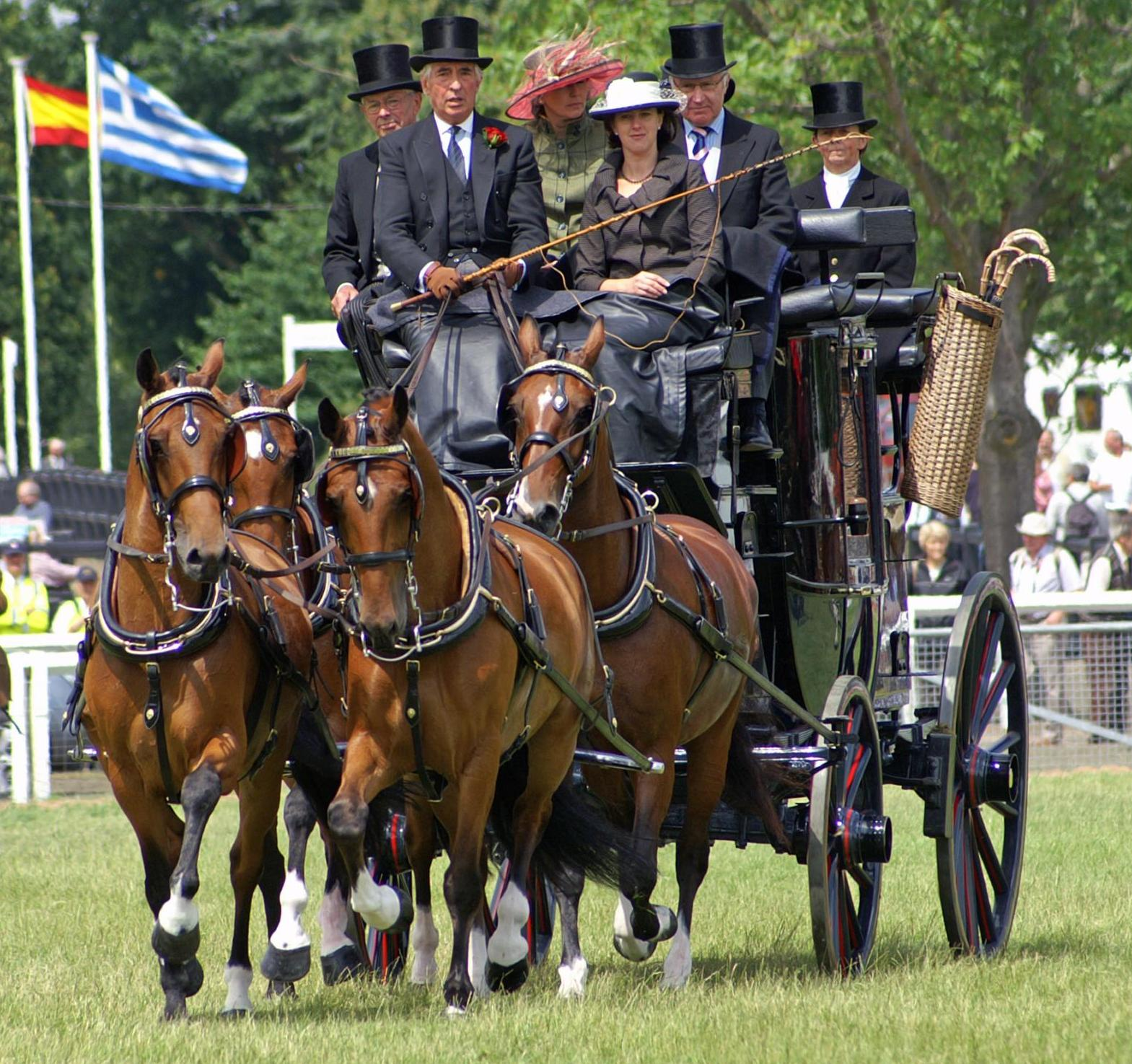
Competitors in carriage driving classes at the Royal Show at Stoneleigh Park 2009

Carriage driving is a form of competitive horse driving in harness in which larger two- or four-wheeled carriages (sometimes restored antiques) are pulled by a single horse, a pair, tandem or a four-in-hand team. Prince Philip, Duke of Edinburgh helped to expand the sport. He started to compete in carriage driving in 1971, and the early rule book was drafted under his supervision.

In competitions, the driver and horse(s) have to complete three tests: Dressage, Marathon, and Obstacle Driving. The International Federation for Equestrian Sports (FEI) oversees International Shows. The FEI Driving rules are followed in these competitions, which aim to protect the welfare of the horse and also ensure fairness in competitions.

Pleasure competitions also have classes which are judged on the turnout, neatness or suitability of the horse(s) and carriage.

== See also ==
- Combined driving – Sport involving horses pulling carriages
- Pleasure driving – Horse show class involving horses pulling carts
