= Quartier Saint-Lambert =

Coordinates: 48.8396453°N 2.2982389°E

Saint-Lambert
- Quartier Saint-Lambert
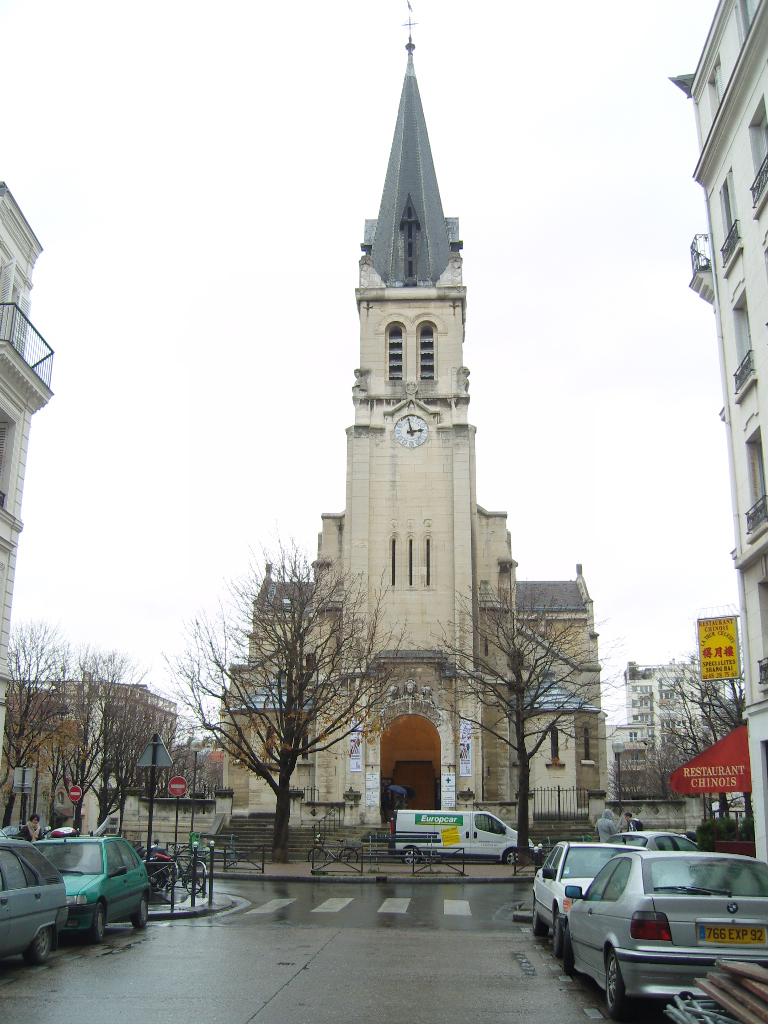
- Church of Saint-Lambert, Vaugirard
- Interactive map of Saint-Lambert
- Country: France
- Region: Île-de-France
- Ville: Paris
- Arrondissement: 15th

Area
  - Total: 2.831 km^{2} (1.093 sq mi)

Population (2016)
  - Total: 86,656
  - Density: 30,610/km^{2} (79,300/sq mi)

The Quartier Saint-Lambert is the 57th quarter of Paris, located in the 15th arrondissement. It is named in honor of the bishop Lambert of Maastricht (c. 636–c. 705). Furthermore, it is the most populous district in Paris, with nearly 82,000 inhabitants.

== Location ==
The Quarters of the 15th arrondissement

The Quartier, located in the southeastern part of the arrondissement, corresponds to the site of the village of Vaugirard, which was established along the road of the same name (an ancient Roman road). It is bounded to the northeast by the eastern section of Rue Mademoiselle, the southern section of Rue Cambronne, a short stretch of Rue de Vaugirard, and then Rue de la Procession; to the southeast by the railway line serving the Gare Montparnasse; to the southwest by streets running along the outer (suburban) side of the Boulevard Périphérique (specifically Rue Louis-Vicat and Rue d'Oradour-sur-Glane—with the neighborhood boundary passing through the Paris Expo Porte de Versailles between them); and finally, to the northwest, by Rue de la Porte-d'Issy, the southern part of Rue Desnouettes, Rue Vasco-de-Gama, and sections of Rue Lecourbe and Rue de la Croix-Nivert.

== History ==
The relatively hilly terrain of the area favored the development of vineyards and quarries. Many Parisian monuments, such as the École Militaire, were built using stone from Vaugirard. As Paris expanded, the village came to be viewed by Parisians as an inner suburb—a pleasant destination for countryside outings, complete with guinguettes (open-air cafés) and cabarets. In 1860, Vaugirard was annexed by Paris, along with all the other surrounding villages.

== Notable sites ==
The neighborhood includes several notable sites, such as:

- the district town hall;
- the skyscraper Tour Triangle;
- the Church of Notre-Dame-de-la-Salette;
- the Church of Saint-Lambert de Vaugirard
- the house and studio of master glassmaker Barillet, designed by architect Robert Mallet-Stevens;
- the Square Saint-Lambert and the Lycée Camille Sée, built on the site of the former Vaugirard gasworks;
- the greater part of the Paris Expo Porte de Versailles, which hosts events such as the Paris Fair (Foire de Paris), the Paris International Agricultural Show, and the Paris Motor Show;
- La Ruche, a registered historical monument, which once housed the studios of artists including Chagall, Modigliani, and Brâncuși;
- the Square de l’Oiseau Lunaire, which contains one of four statues created by Joan Miró in 1967—gifted by the artist to the City of Paris and installed in 1974.
