= Good Food march =

Protest for agricultural issues

Good Food march is a march conceived and promoted by several international organizations, among which the European Coordination Via Campesina, Friends of the Earth Europe, Slow Food, International Federation of Organic Agriculture Movements (IFOAM), Group PAC 2013, Agricultural and Rural Convention 2020 and many more, that addresses issues related to agriculture and nutrition and with the participation of citizens of the European Union and international organizations of various kinds, including Oxfam, WWF, Greenpeace. The network also supports the annual We are fed up!-demonstrations in Berlin.

== Goals ==
The purposes of this event is to raise awareness among citizens and the political world on the current situation of European agriculture and to promote the call of a new EU policy to ensure good food and good agriculture.

The first Good Food March took off on August 25, 2012 in Munich. The event will be concluded in Brussels, at the conference "CAP REFORM 2020 – an opportunity for European democracy" organized by Slow Food and ARC2020 on the reform of the Common Agricultural Policy (CAP).

2012 Good Food March initiators ask the EU institutions for a Common Agricultural Policy that:

- delivers secure and stable cost covering prices for farmers and fair prices for consumer;
- values natural, cultural and culinary heritage;
- supports family farms, both young and old;
- links subsidies directly to social, environment, and animal welfare criteria;
- leads towards a greener and more sustainable agriculture and promotes agro-ecological farming methods;
- strengthens the social and economic development of rural communities;
- guarantees the cultivation of local protein feed crops, rather than imported soy;
- ensures greater equity between old and new EU Member States;
- leads towards food sovereignty;
- assumes international responsibility and ensures that Europe and the global South become more self-sufficient;
- rejects food speculation and ends the export of agricultural products at a price below their production cost.

== See also ==
- Common Agriculture Policy
- Food sovereignty
- Agribusiness
- Agro-ecology
- Food security
- Slow Food
- Via Campesina
