= Cotentin Donkey =

French breed of donkey

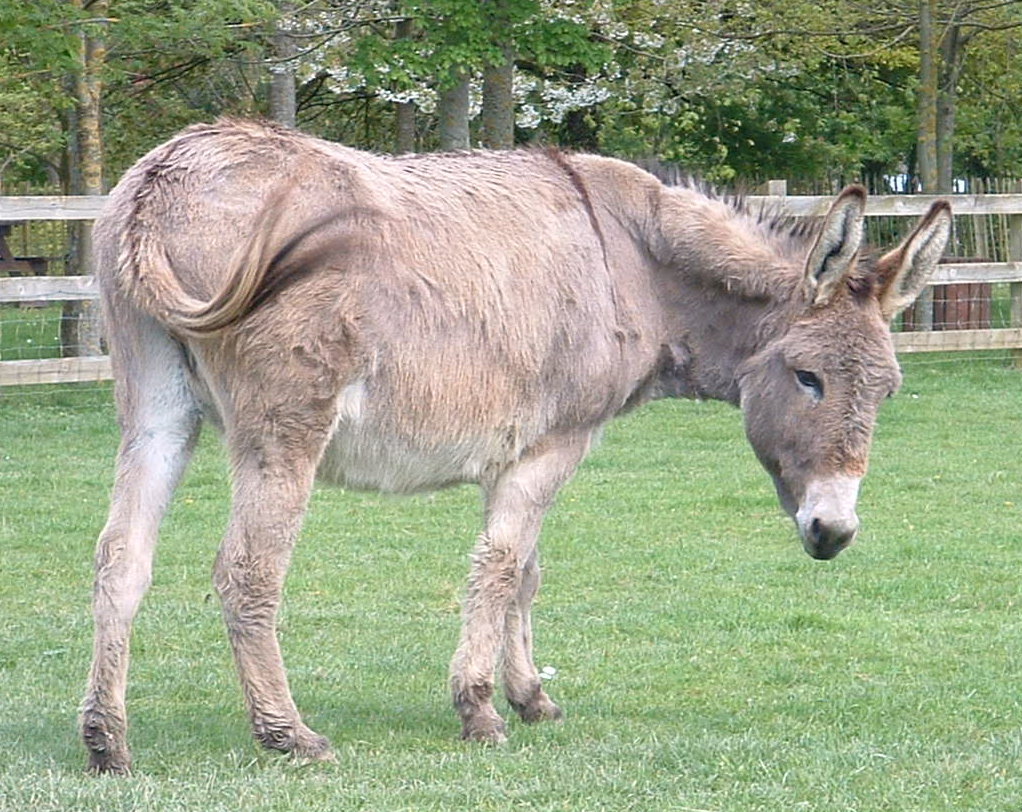
- At the Écomusée de la Bintinais in Rennes

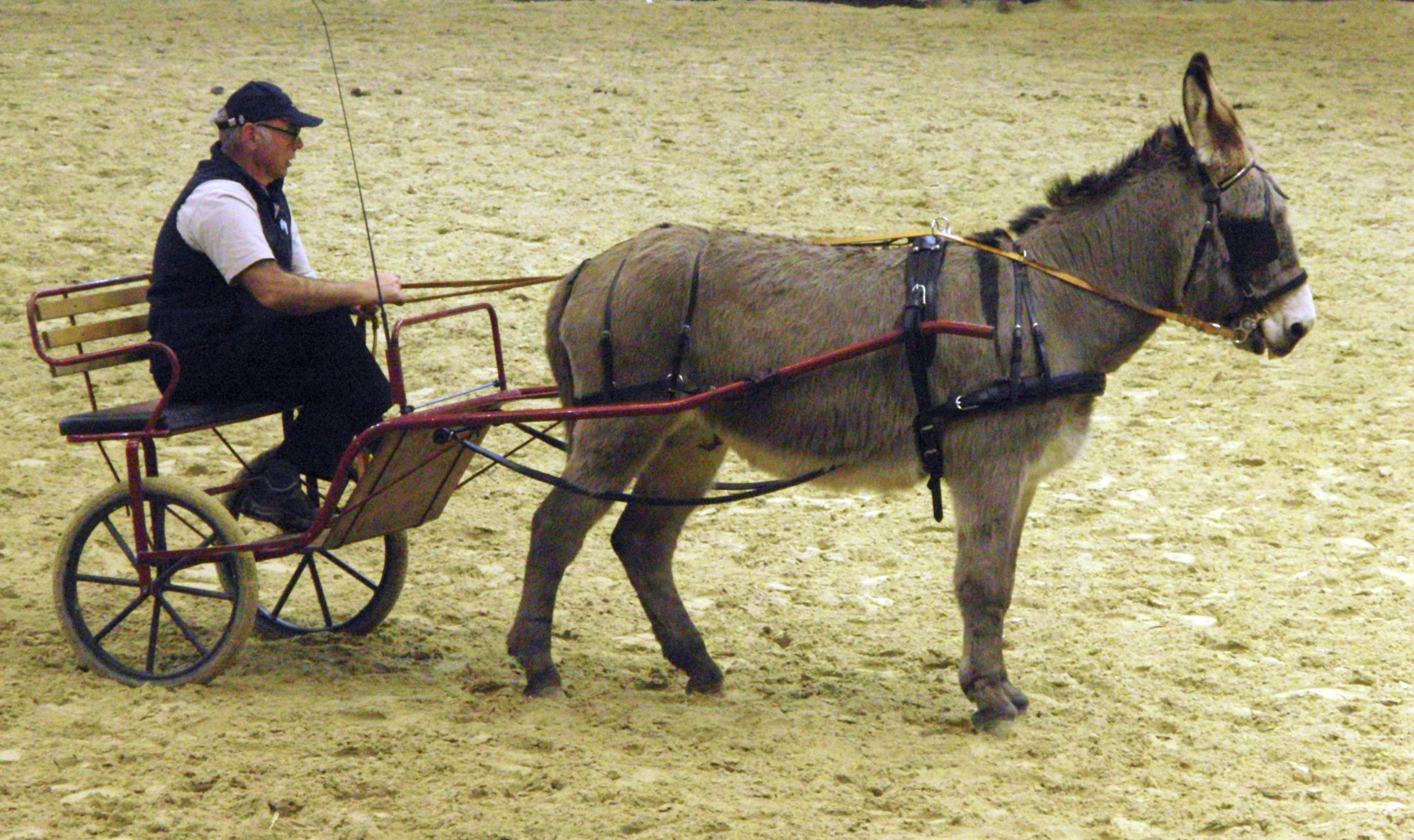
- At the Salon International de l'Agriculture in Paris, 2013
- Conservation status: FAO (2007): no data; SAVE (2008): endangered; DAD-IS (2025): at risk/endangered-maintained
- Other names: Âne du Cotentin
- Country of origin: France
- Distribution: north-west France
- Standard: Ministère de l'Agriculture

Traits
- Height: Male: 1.20–1.35 m; Female: 1.15–1.30 m
- Coat: grey, with dark dorsal stripe and shoulder-stripe

The Cotentin Donkey or Âne du Cotentin is a French breed of domestic donkey from the Cotentin peninsula, in the département of la Manche, in the Lower Normandy Region of north-west France. It is found mostly in that region, but is distributed through much of north-western France. It was in the past used as a pack animal in agricultural work, mainly for carrying milk churns; it is now used in leisure sports and tourism. The breed was recognised by the Ministère de l'Agriculture, the French ministry of agriculture, in 1997. The stud-book is kept by the Association de l'âne du Cotentin, an association of breeders.

== History ==
Donkeys are documented in the Cotentin from the sixteenth century. In the 1930s there were 9000 donkeys in the département of la Manche. Numbers dwindled with the mechanisation of agriculture in the period after the Second World War, but less rapidly than in some other breeds, and in 1960 there were still 7000 in the Manche. A breeders' association, the Association de l’âne du Cotentin, was formed in 1995; since 1997, when the breed was officially recognised by the agriculture ministry and the Haras Nationaux, the association has kept the stud-book for the breed.

The Cotentin Donkey is raised mainly in Lower Normandy, but is also found in more than half the départements of France, mostly in the north-west. Numbers were estimated at 650–700 in 2001. In 2011 there were 107 breeders, and 140 new registrations in the stud-book, approximately a quarter of all new donkey registrations in that year.

== Characteristics ==
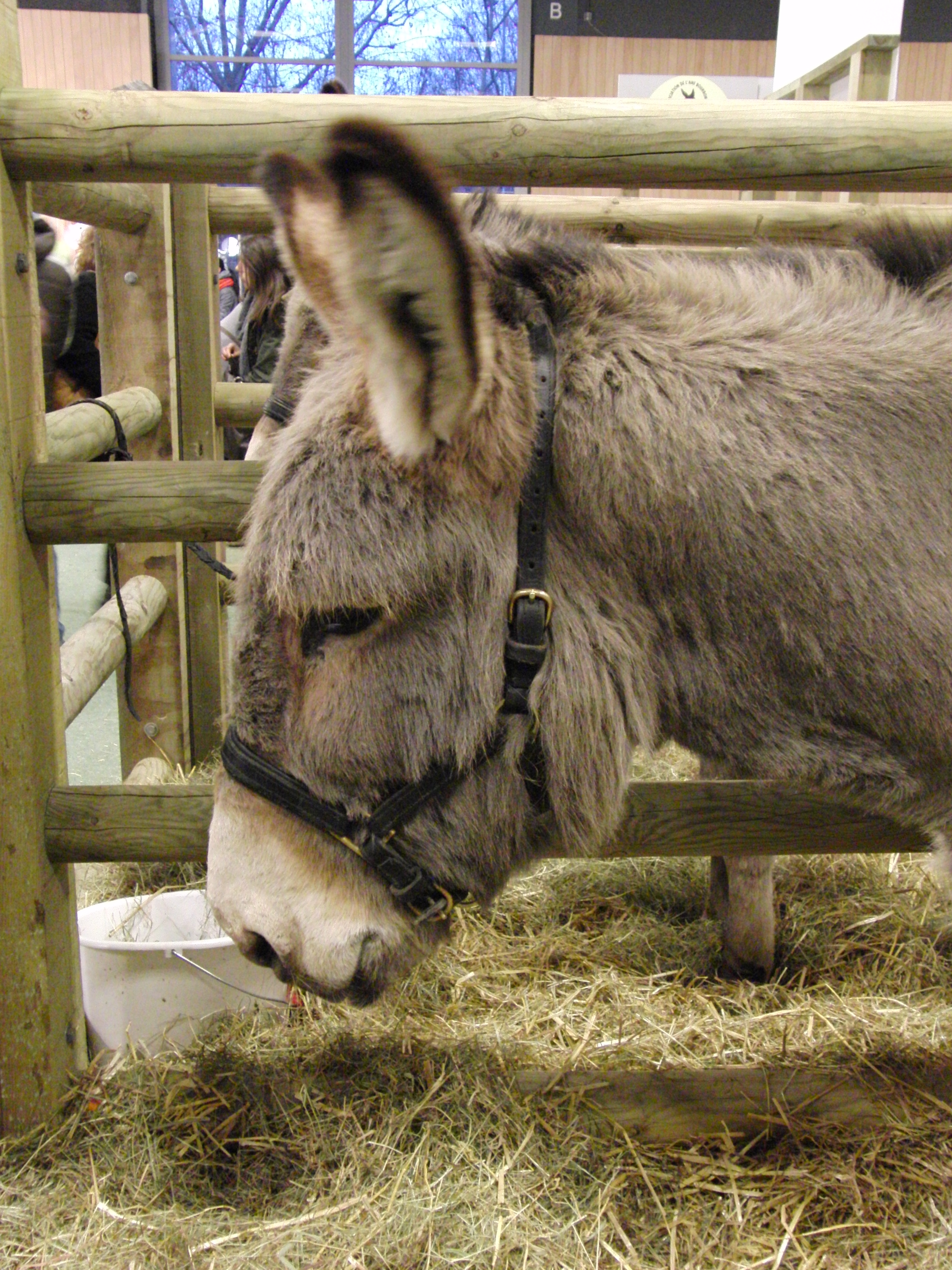
Close-up of head

Jacks stand about 1.20–1.35 m (47–53 in) at the withers, jennies about 1.15–1.30 m (45–51 in). The coat is dove-grey, with a well-defined darker dorsal stripe and shoulder-stripe; the legs may show zebra-striping. The lower part of the muzzle is grey-white, as is the belly.

== Use ==
Like the Norman Donkey, the Cotentin Donkey was formerly used in agricultural work, both as a pack animal to transport churns of milk in a time when cows were milked by hand in the field, and in harness. In the twenty-first century it may be used as a pack animal for hiking or trekking, for recreational driving, in therapy for the handicapped, or kept as a companion animal or pet. The milk may be used to make cold process soap.
