= Norman donkey =

French breed of donkey

Norman
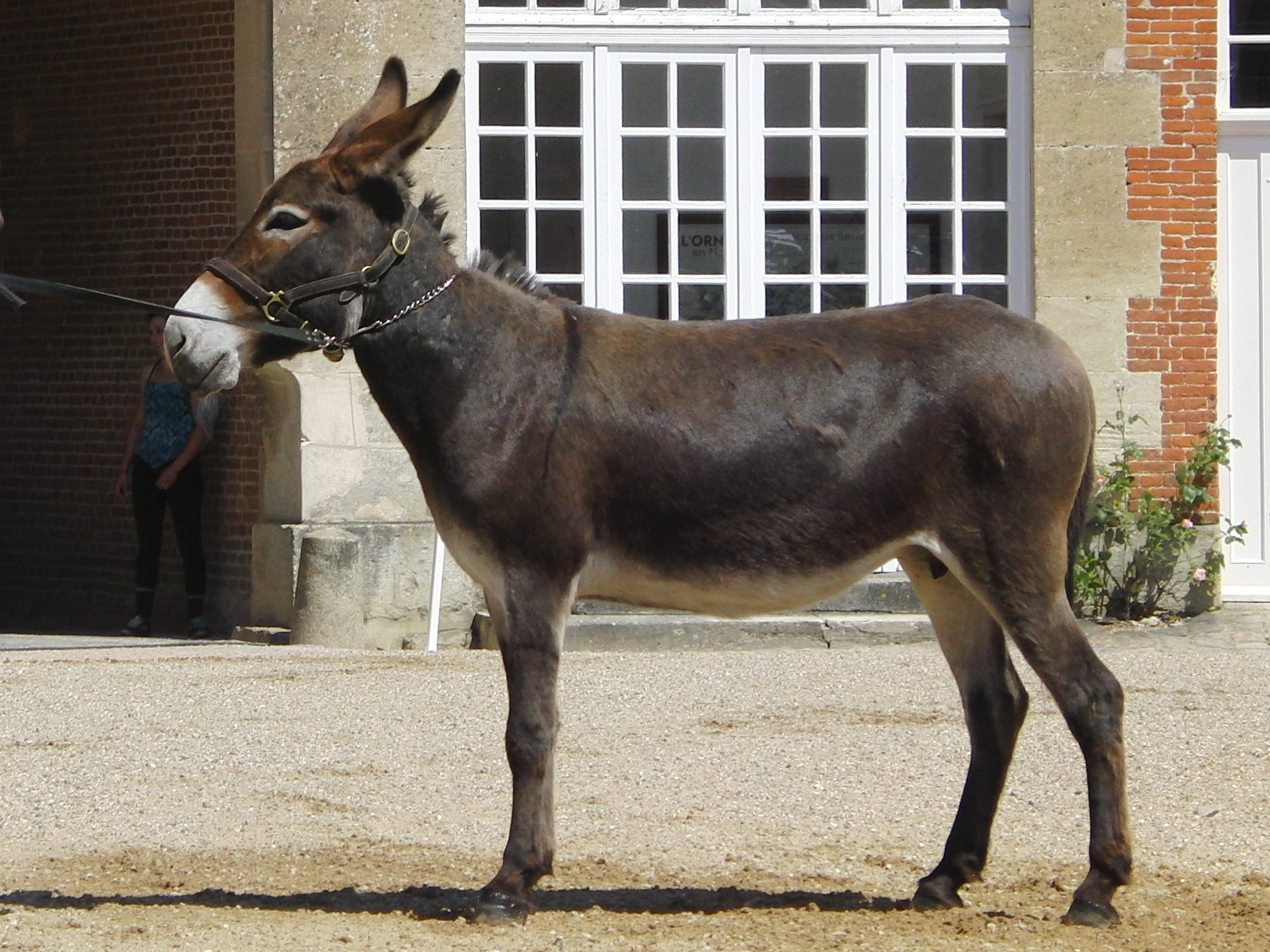

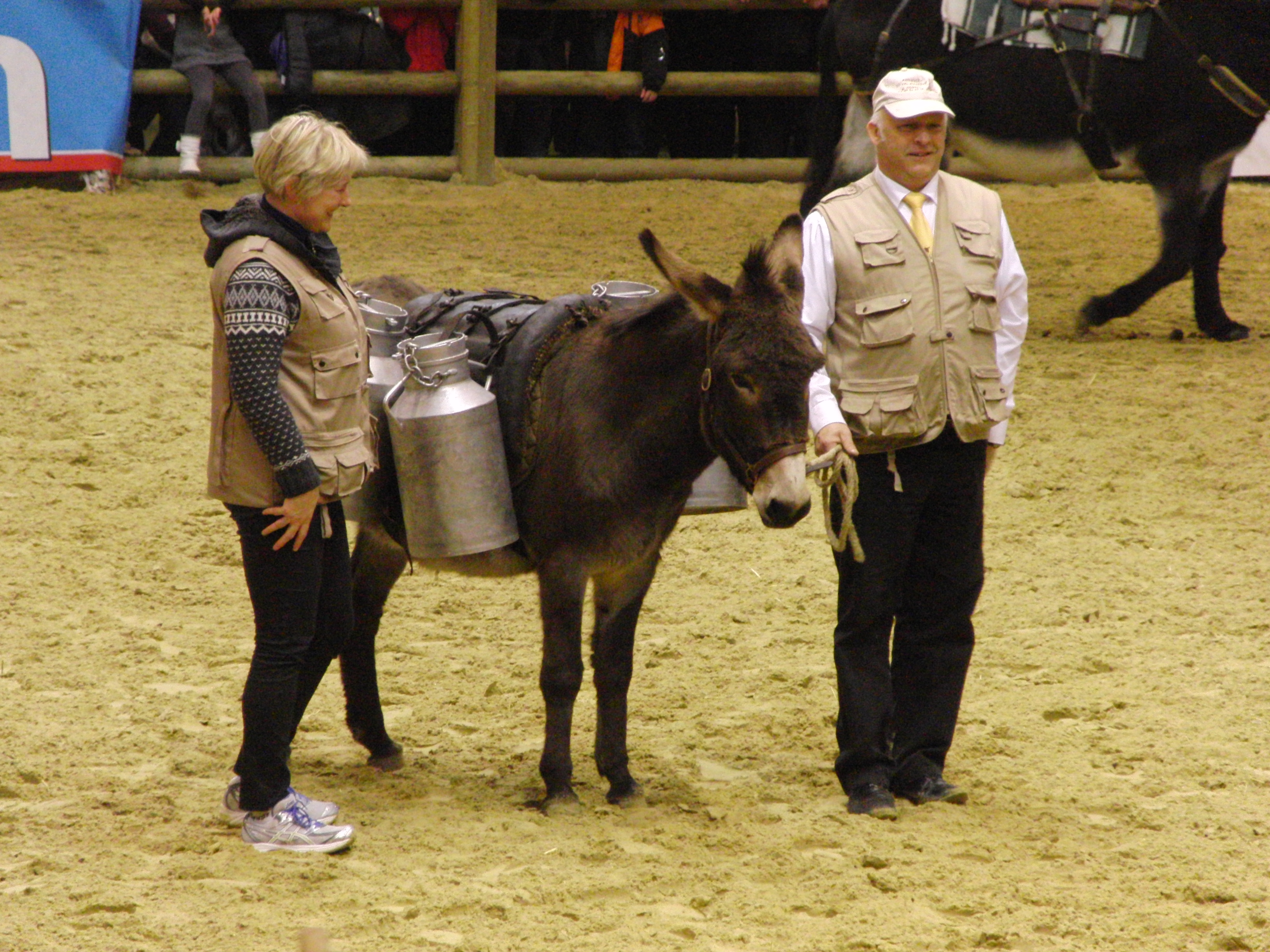
- At the Salon International de l'Agriculture in Paris in 2013
- Conservation status: FAO (2007): no data; SAVE (2008): endangered
- Other names: Âne Normand
- Country of origin: France
- Distribution: north-west France
- Standard: Ministère de l'Agriculture

Traits
- Weight: about 180 kg
- Height: 1.10–1.25 m (43–49 in)
- Coat: bay in any shade

The Norman, French: Âne Normand, is a French breed of domestic donkey from Normandy, in north-west France. It is found mainly in the regions of Lower and Upper Normandy, and is also present in Brittany and the Pays de Loire. It is the smallest of the seven recognised French donkey breeds. It was formerly used as a pack animal in agricultural work, mainly for carrying milk churns; it is now used in leisure sports and tourism. It was recognised by the Ministère de l'Agriculture, the French ministry of agriculture, in 1997. The stud-book is kept by the breed society, the Association de l'Âne Normand.

== History ==
The breed originated in the three départements of what is now Lower Normandy, the Calvados, the Manche and the Orne; in 1970 there were 8500 donkeys of all breeds in that area. The Normand was recognised by the Ministère de l'Agriculture on 20 August 1997. In 1998 a total of 225 of the donkeys had been identified; the total number is now 1450.

== Characteristics ==
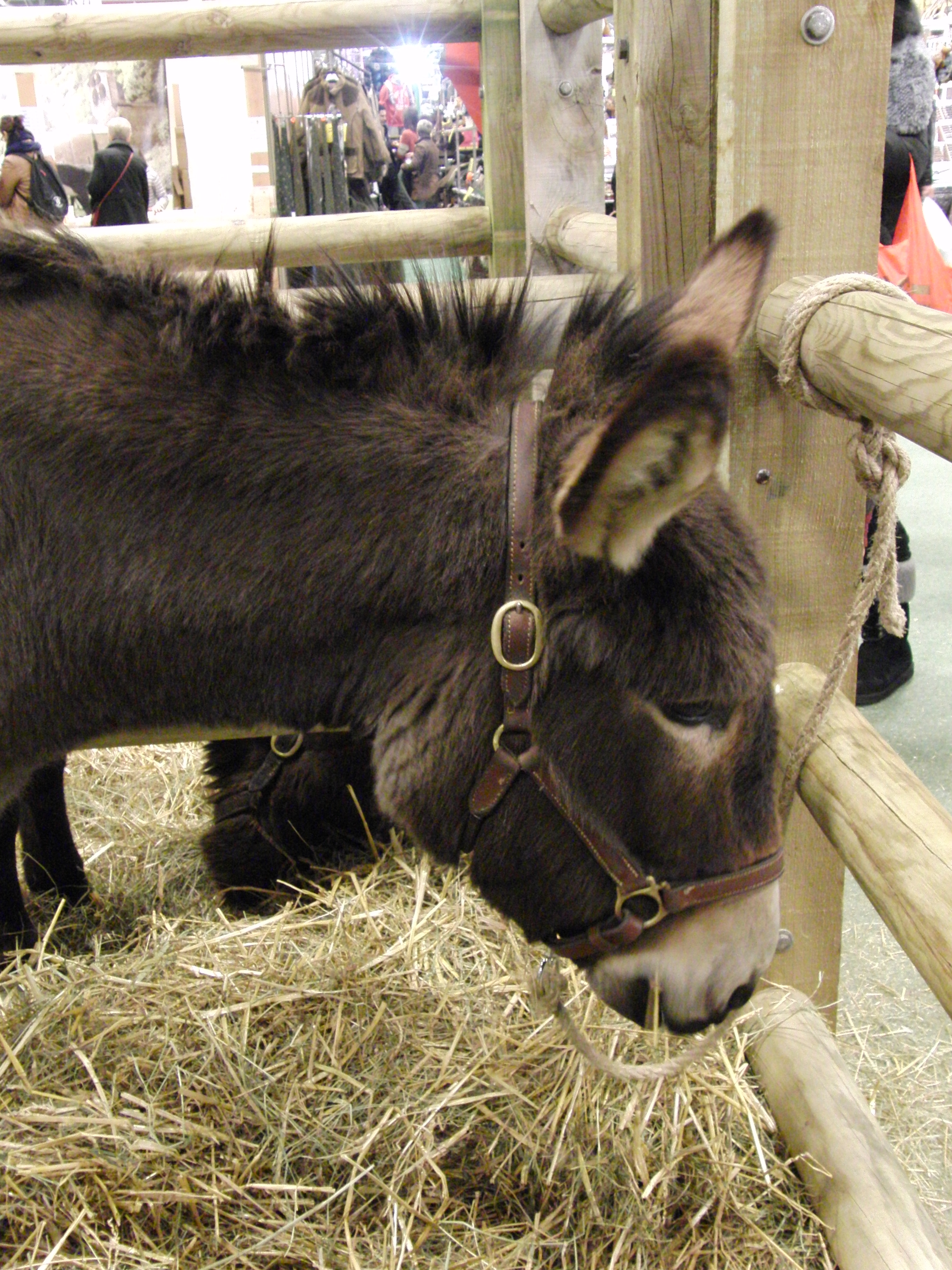
Head

The donkeys, both male and female, usually stand between 1.10 and 1.25 m at the withers. The coat may be any shade of bay, with a darker dorsal stripe and shoulder-stripe; grey animals are not eligible for registration. The legs often show zebra-striping; the surrounds of the eyes and lower part of the muzzle are grey-white, as is the belly.

== Use ==
Like the Cotentin, the Normand was used in the nineteenth century as a pack animal to transport market garden produce, or take hay to livestock at pasture, or to carry milk-churns in a time when cows were milked by hand in the field; it could carry a load of approximately its own weight – about 180 kg. Often the milkmaid or triolette sat on top of the churns. It was also used in harness, sometimes to pull a large wheeled churn, a godaine.

In the twenty-first century it may be used as a pack animal for hiking or trekking.
