= Agricultural and Rural Convention 2020 =

Agricultural and Rural Convention 2020 (ARC2020) describes itself as "a multi-stakeholder platform of over 150 civil society networks and organisations within 22 EU Member States all pushing for a reform of the EU’s Common Agricultural Policy (CAP)". It has carried out several campaigns to raise awareness among citizens and the political world on the current situation of European agriculture, such as the Good Food March.

== Organization ==
Founded in 2010, ARC2020 is the result of the work of Groupe de Bruges, a European think tank specializing in agriculture and rural development, a European network of local projects in sustainable rural development called Forum Synergies, and the European School for Journalists called Institut des hautes études des communications sociales (IHECS). It is funded by various European foundations.

ARC2020 states that its main goals are:

- to give civil society a strong voice in the current reform debate;
- to prepare common actions across European borders;
- to mobilise individuals and organisations beyond traditional stakeholder interests.

It claims to represent diverse issues and interests from nature protection, human health and animal welfare, to development cooperation, global justice and climate change, as well as those of conventional and organic farmers and rural development networks.

== See also ==
- Agroecology
- Common Agricultural Policy
- Good Food March
- We are fed up
