= Berlin International Green Week =

German agribusiness trade fair

Coordinates: 52°30′18.2″N 13°16′41.45″E

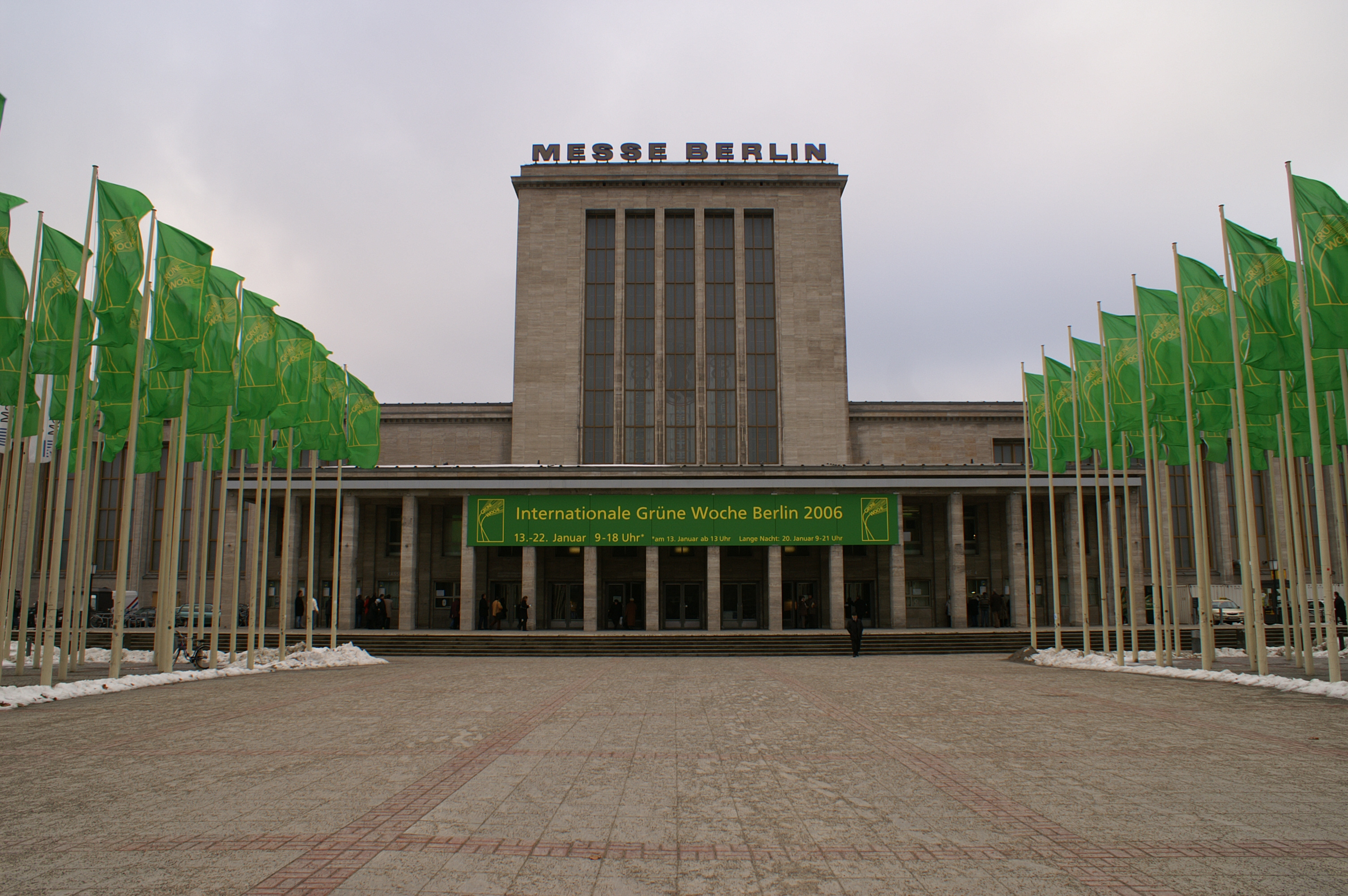
International Green Week in Berlin, the entrance to the fairgrounds, 2006

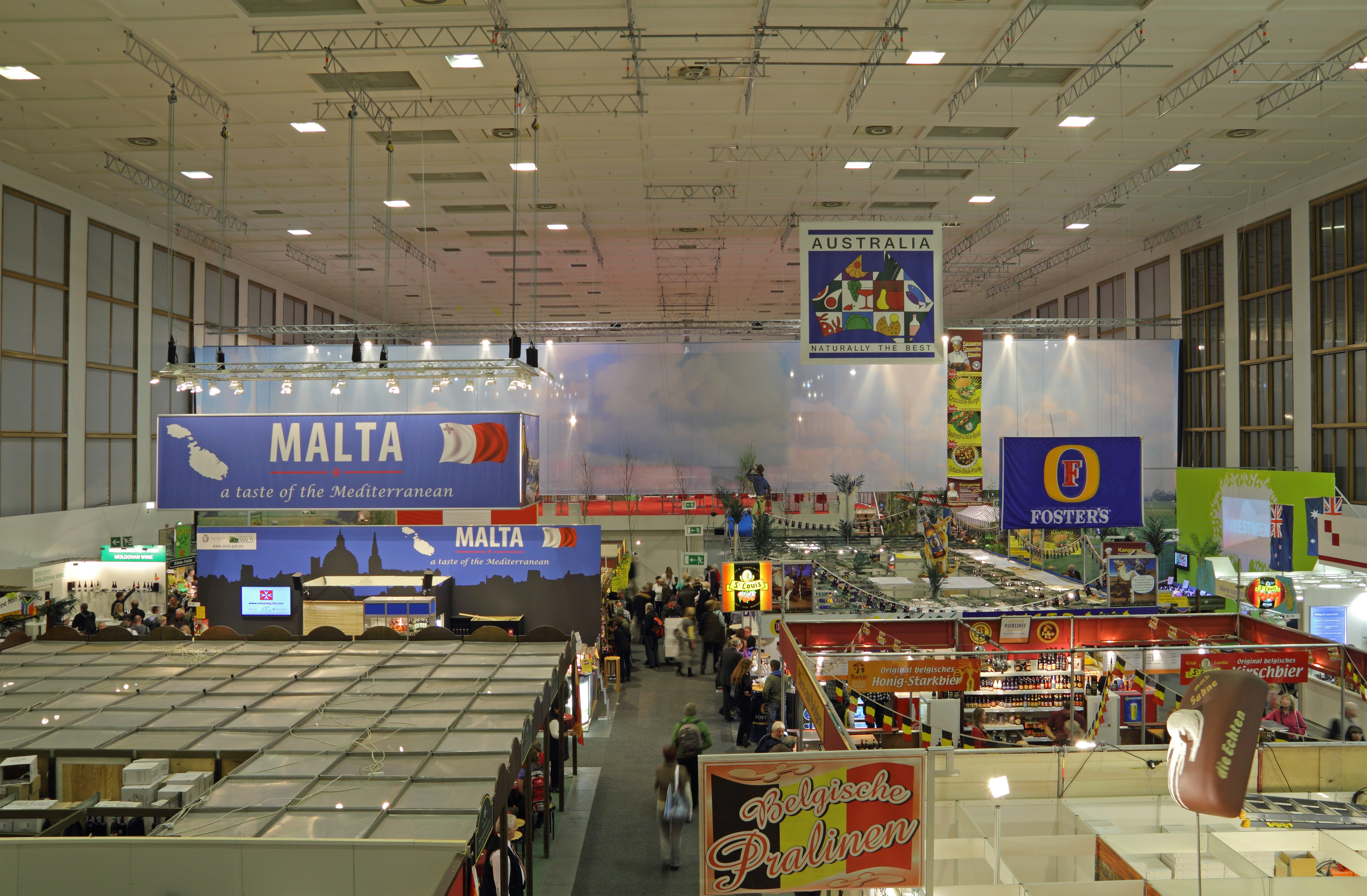
One of the exhibition halls, 2013

Berlin International Green Week (German: Internationale Grüne Woche Berlin), also called simply Green Week, is an important international trade fair held annually in Berlin, Germany, for processors and marketers in agriculture, horticulture and various food industries. Green Week traditionally takes place at the beginning of the year in the Messe Berlin exhibition halls under the Funkturm and is open to the general public. In 2010 it had around 400,000 visitors. That same year, the Paris International Agricultural Show (French: Salon International de l'Agriculture) had 650,000 visitors.

Since 2011, the fair is accompanied by protests themed We are fed up!. Between 15,000 and 30,000 people demonstrate against industrial livestock production and for more sustainable farming.

== History ==
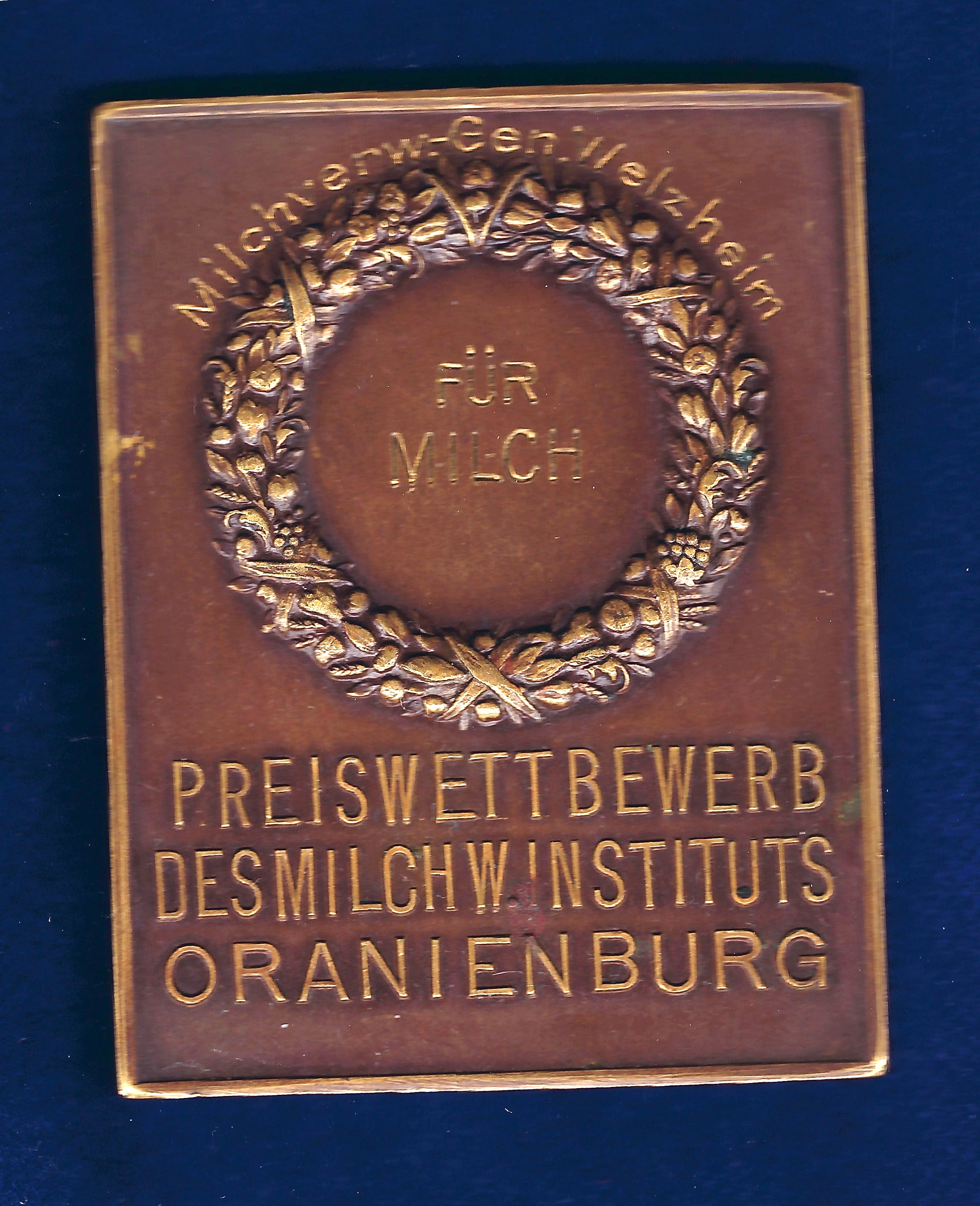
The reverse of this plaque medal showing the winner, Co-operative Welzheim

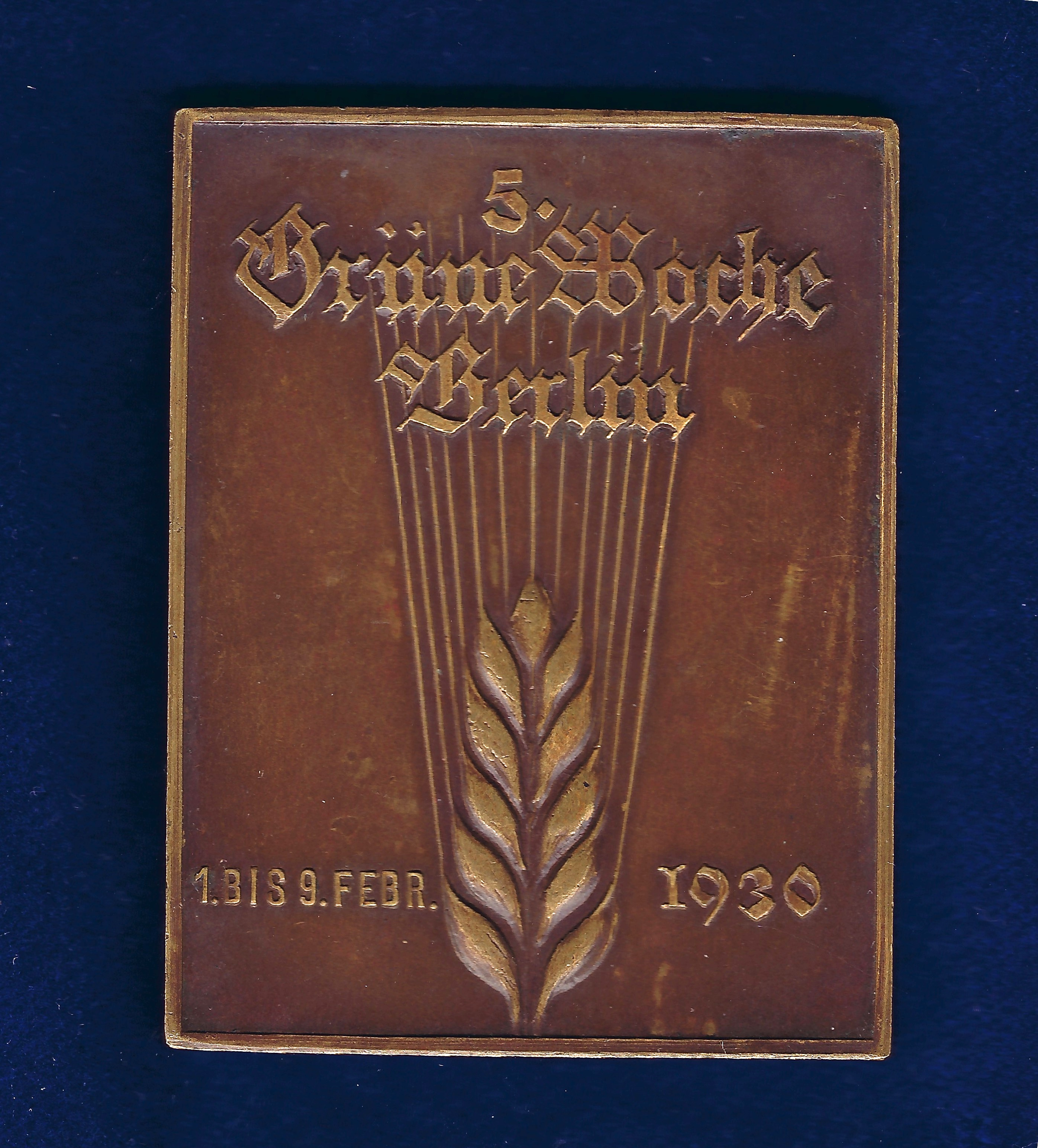
Green Week 1930 prize medal by Oranienburg Milk Research Institute, obverse

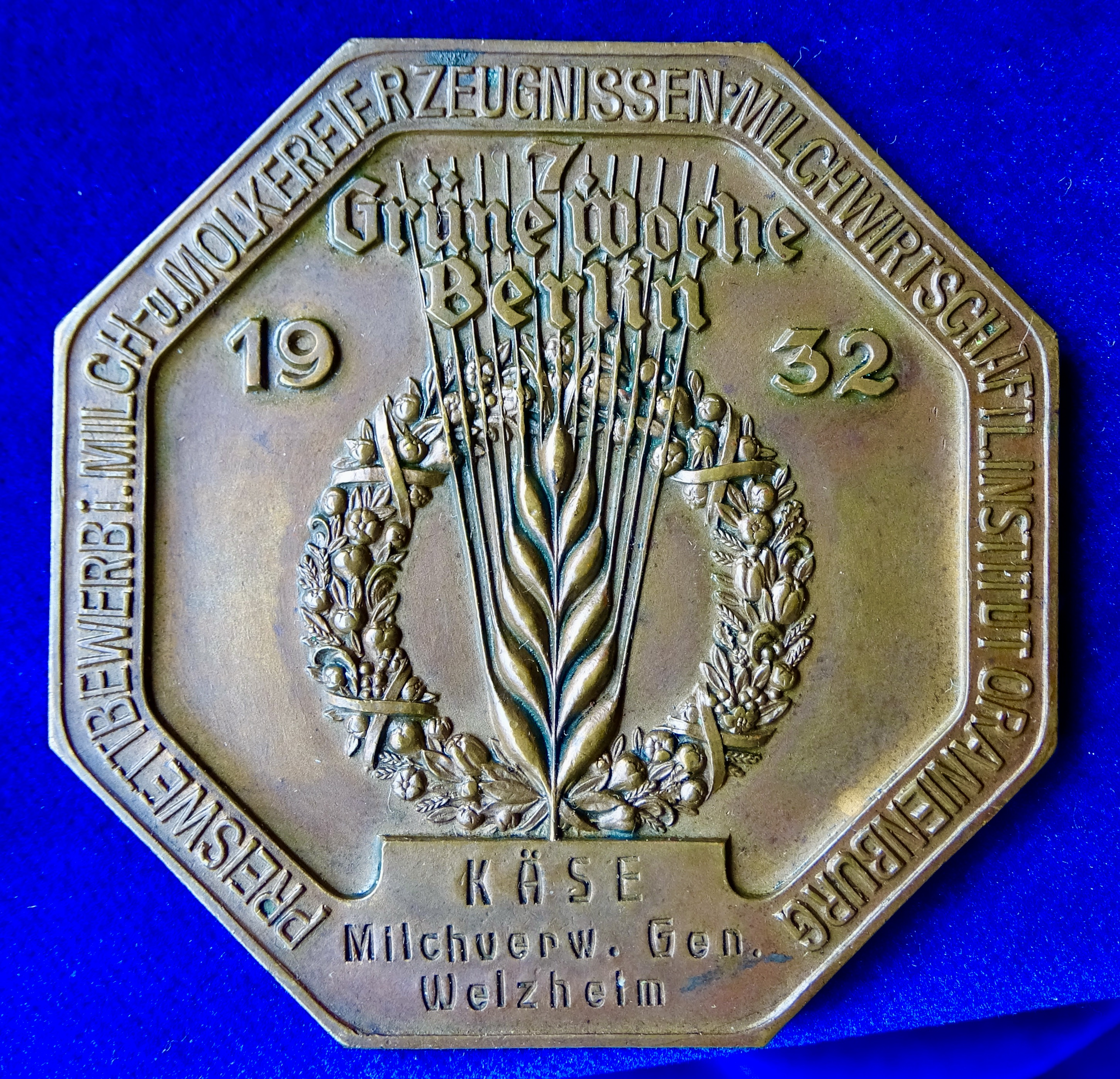
Berlin 1932 Prize Plaque Medal International Green Week

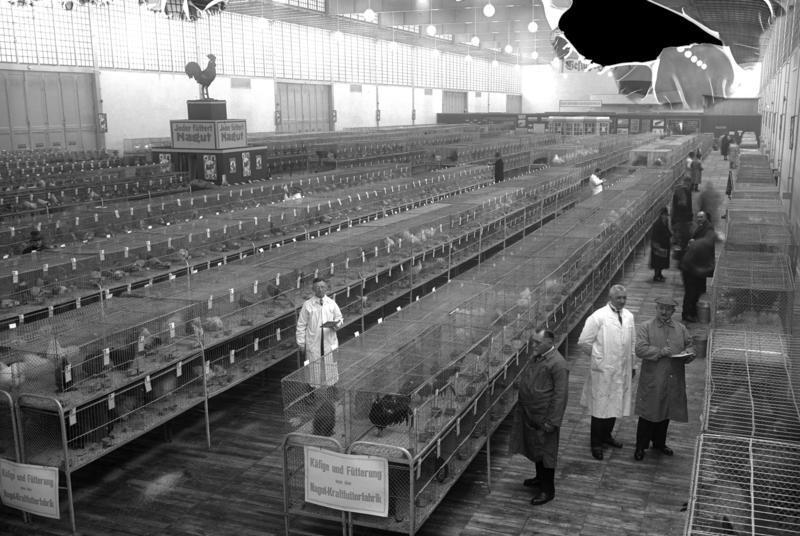
Green Week in 1930

The first green week (not yet "international") was held from 20 to 28 February 1926, when an employee at the Berlin Tourism Office had the idea to combine the traditional winter meeting of the German Agricultural Society with an agricultural exhibition as a secondary showcase for fair participants. Green Week owes its name to the green felt coats (German: Lodenmäntel) worn by German foresters and farmers. In the first year, there were 50,000 visitors and the fair had covered an area of 7,000 m^{2}.

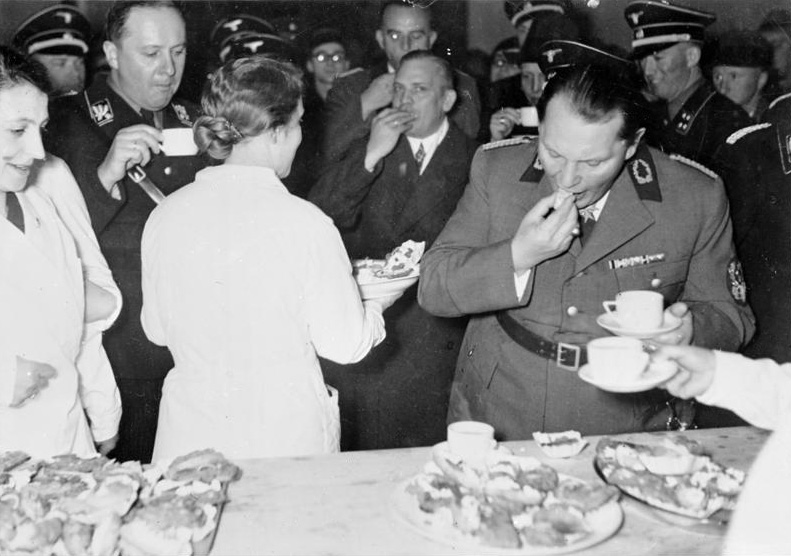
Hermann Göring attending the Green Week in 1937

Green Week took place every year until 1939, with the exception of 1938 because of an outbreak of European foot-and-mouth disease. After the devastation of World War II, Green Week resumed in 1948. After a break in 1951 due to major postwar construction, the fair was held again in 1951 and every year since. Participation of foreign exhibitors increased continuously: by 1963 they accounted two-thirds of exhibitors. After German reunification in the 1990s, Green Week grew substantially. Special shows on topics such as "German Cheese" and since 2005 a technical program of over 250 lectures, seminars and symposia round off the exhibition.

== See also ==
- German Trade Fairs
