= Paris Expo Porte de Versailles =

Exhibition and conference center in Paris, France

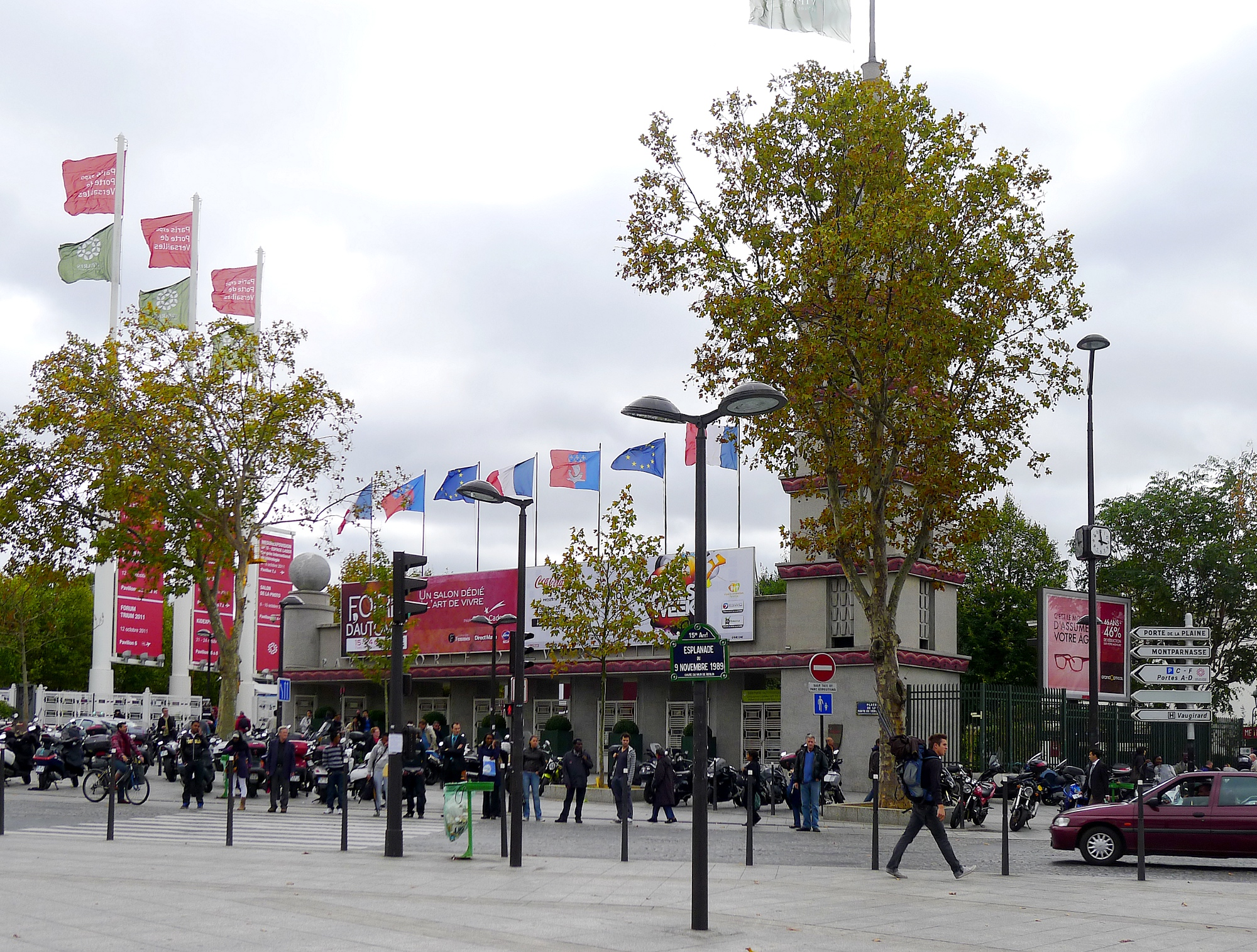
- Entrance to the Parc des expositions
- Interactive map of Paris Expo Porte de Versailles
- Address: 1 Place de la Porte de Versailles, 75015 Paris, France
- Coordinates: 48.8319°N 2.2891°E
- Operator: Viparis
- Public transit: Porte de Versailles

Construction
- Opened: 1923

Website
- paris-expoportedeversailles.com

The Paris Expo Porte de Versailles is an exhibition and conference centre in Paris, France. It is located in the 15th arrondissement at Porte de Versailles Métro station between the Boulevard Périphérique and Boulevards of the Marshals. It is the largest exhibition park in France.

Paris Expo Porte de Versailles has 228,211 m^{2} (2,456,440 sq ft) of exhibition floor, eight pavilions, two auditoriums, and 32 meeting rooms. The exhibition center hosts over 120 trade shows yearly, plus events, product launches, and conventions. The Tour Triangle, a 180 metres tall glass pyramid, is planned to be constructed near the site. It houses a 120-room hotel and 70,000 square metres of office space.

Paris Expo was a venue of the 2024 Summer Olympics (with the name South Paris Arena), hosting handball, weightlifting, volleyball, and table tennis competitions.

== History ==
The first buildings for exhibitions on this site date back to 1923 to accommodate the Foire de Paris, which until then had been held on the Champ de Mars. The land then covered thirty-five hectares on the border of the communes of Paris, Issy-les-Moulineaux and Vanves.

The building was built on the site of the Thiers Wall. In 1922, several projects were put forward to build the exhibition center desired by the authorities. The brothers Louis and Pierre Guidetti proposed in particular to erect an immense metal building, which was ultimately not retained. The project of the architects Paul Viard and Marcel Dastugue was chosen, consisting of around twenty halls arranged at the level of Boulevard Lefebvre and Avenue Ernest-Renan. Only four remain today, the Peripherique's development having led to the destruction of all of the other portions of the wall. The Paris Fair was established there from 1926.

In 1936, on Mid-Lent Thursday, it was exceptionally the gathering and departure point for the great Fat Ox procession, a major event of the Carnaval de Paris.

In 1937, a monumental entrance with four illuminated turrets, which is still visible today, was built by Louis-Hippolyte Boileau and Léon Azéma as part of the that year's Universal Exhibition.

The Second World War marked a halt to temporary exhibitions, with the site even being occupied by the military. Then, the 1950s saw the emergence of new exhibitions such as those for cycles, heavy goods vehicles, leather goods, and the Concours général agricole (which would be included in the Paris International Agricultural Show after 1964).

In 1962, the Paris Motion Festival arrived, which until then had been held at the Grand Palais (from 1976, it was held every other year, alternating with the Frankfurt Motor Show).

In June 1968, the Gaullist party held a large meeting there with a speech by André Malraux.

In 1970, a new building, Hall 7, covering 72,000 m², was opened, increasing the park's surface area by half. The 1980s saw the arrival of the Boat Show for the first time on this site.

In 1992, the Paris Book Fair arrived, having previously been held for its first ten years at the Grand Palais.

Between 1996 and 2006, half of the facilities were rebuilt and modernized. The site also offers three amphitheaters and several meeting rooms.

In September 2008, the Paris city hall announced a project to create a high-rise office building (180 m) called Triangle on the site of the exhibition center and financed by Unibail-Rodamco-Westfield.

In June 2019, the artist duo Ella and Pitr inaugurate the largest fresco in Europe on the roof of Pavilion 3 of Paris Expo Porte de Versailles. The work extends over 23,000 m² of that pavilion's roof, crossed by the Peripherique.

== Events ==
- Bijorhca Paris, salon
- Equipmag, point of sale, retail, and distribution exhibition
- Foire de Paris retail fair April–May
- Paris Autumn Fair
- IFTM, Professional Tourism Fair
- International Hobby Model Making Fair
- iGEM
- Paris International Agricultural Show
- Paris Motor Show
- Paris Boat Show
- Paris Games Week
- Kidexpo
- 2018 Beyblade Burst World Championship
- Prêt-à-Porter Summer Paris, trade fair every other year
- Rétromobile
- Six Paris Major
- European Respiratory Society (ERS) International Congress 2018, 15–19 September
- 69th FIFA Congress
- Federation of European Neuroscience Societies Forum 2022
- 2024 Summer Olympics — Handball (preliminaries), Table Tennis, Volleyball, Weightlifting
- 2024 Summer Paralympics — Boccia, Goalball, Table Tennis
- 2025 TFT Open
- 2026 Esports World Cup

== Transport ==
Paris expo Porte de Versailles is served by:

- Porte de Versailles station on Paris Métro line 12 (offering a direct link to Gare Montparnasse and Gare Saint-Lazare).
- tramway lines T2 and T3a (stop 'Porte de Versailles').
- RATP bus routes 39 (stop 'Desnouettes' or 'Porte d'Issy') and 80 (stop 'Porte de Versailles').
- Noctilien night bus routes N13, N62 and N145.
