= Foire de Paris =

Major retail event held annually in Paris since 1904

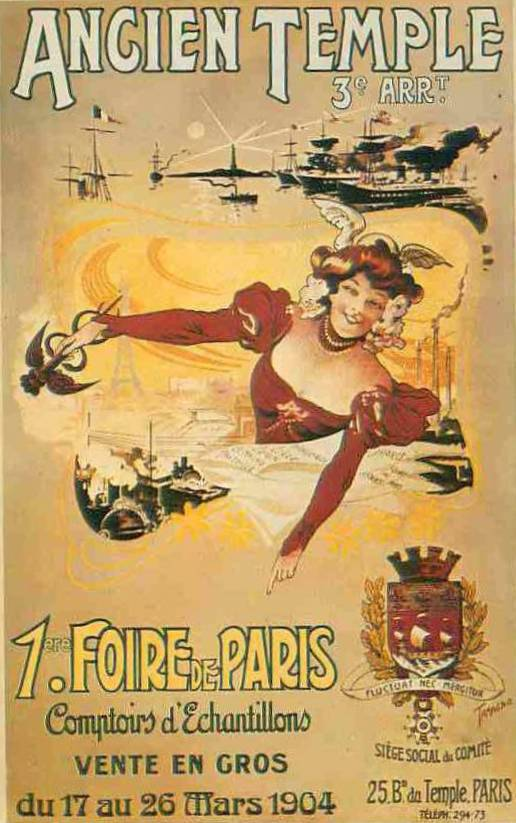
- 1904 poster
- Formation: 1904
- Type: Fair
- Headquarters: Paris, France
- Location: Paris expo Porte de Versailles
- Coordinates: 48.831900°N 2.289100°E
- Official language: French
- Parent organization: Comexposium
- Website: www.foiredeparis.fr

The Foire de Paris (Paris Fair) is a major retail event that has been held annually in Paris since 1904, typically for ten days in April–May. Although mainly showing domestic goods, it offers a varied range of products for the general public. Since 1924 the fair has been held in the Porte de Versailles exhibition center. It is the largest general-purpose fair in Europe.

== Foundation and early years ==
The concept of the Foire de Paris was aired in 1889 by a jeweler named Gustave Sandoz, but was dropped as preparations began for the Exposition Universelle of 1900. In 1903 an organizing committee was established by the Chambre Syndicale des Jeux et Jouets, and the first fair was opened in March 1904. During World War I (1914–18) the fair was suspended in 1915. In February 1916 the new Minister of Commerce, Étienne Clémentel, suggested reopening the fair. It was held on 1–17 March 1917 on the Esplanade des Invalides, showing only French products. This fair included agricultural machinery for the first time, but also included more than 400 booths devoted to fashion. The fair was again banned in 1918. In 1921 the fair was held on the Champ de Mars and Les Invalides.

The first Salon des Appareils Ménagers (Home Appliances Fair) was held between 18 October 1923 and 4 November 1923 in 5,000 square metres (54,000 sq ft) of the Foire de Paris on the Champ de Mars. The first show was held in a simple hut. In 1923 the Parc des expositions was created at the Porte de Versaille to accommodate the fair and the exhibitions organized by the Ministry of Agriculture. From 1924 the Foire de Paris was hosted in the Porte de Versailles. In 1925 the fair began to include foreign products, showing new openness to international competition. From 1929 the fair has hosted the Concours Lépine, a competition for inventions. In 1929 the fair had 754 foreign exhibitors. President Albert François Lebrun visited the 1934 fair at the Porte de Versailles. During World War II (1939–45) the fair was held in 1940, closing on 10 May 1940 on the day of the great German offensive. It was suspended for the rest of the war.

== Post war ==
The head of the Provisional Government, General Charles de Gaulle, inaugurated the Foire de Paris in 1945. The 1948 fair covered 45 hectares (110 acres) and included luxury goods such as leather and shoes for the first time since the war. It also had 23 television sets, which attracted thousands of people. In 1950 President Vincent Auriol advised the French people, "Let all who are melancholic and sad come to the Paris Fair, their sorrow will give way to optimism." In 1960 the sensation of the fair was a realistic village of 30 fully equipped houses surrounding a church. The organizers arranged for a young couple to be married in the church during the fair. In 1968 the fair suffered from civic disturbances, with the metro on strike on opening day, but still had almost 400,000 visitors. The 1969 fair was overhauled and arranged into large, specialized exhibitions. In 1972 there were one million visitors. Over the next years the fair began to stay open for longer into the evening, and evolved with new categories, including renewable energy and energy efficiency (1981), windsurfing and home computers (1983), swimming pools (1986).

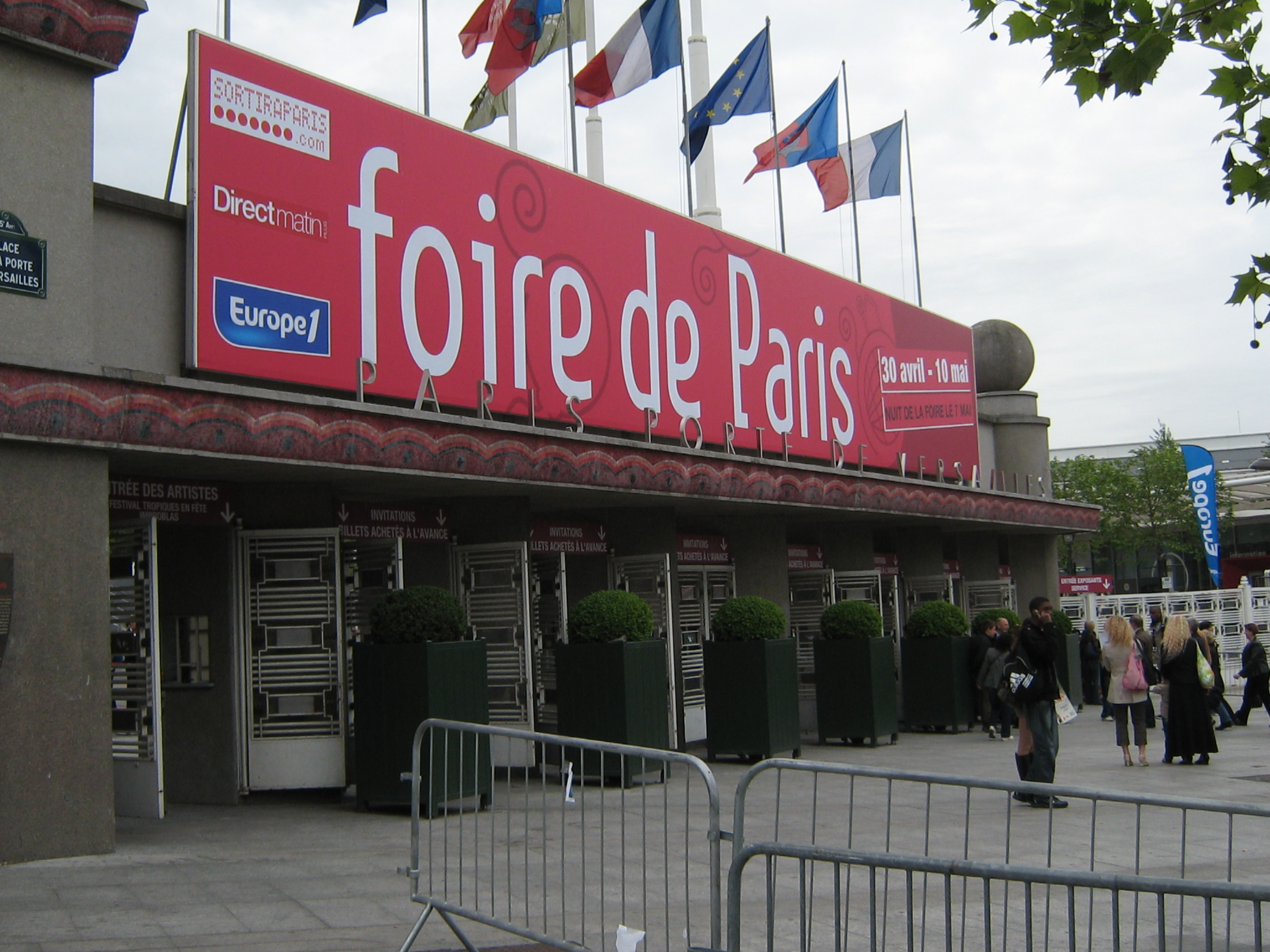
Entrance in 2009

== Recent years ==
In 2012 the Foire de Paris, which is the largest general fair in Europe, lasted for twelve days and closed on 8 May 2012. There had been 620,000 visitors, 4% more than in 2011. 88% of visitors had made purchases, spending on average €740. The fair had 3,400 exhibitors in an area of 220,000 square metres (2,400,000 sq ft). It included performance, workshops, games and competitions. Due to the economic crisis, average expenditure dropped to €320 in 2013. At the 2014 fair the average visitor spent €437. The 2014 fair had 575,000 visitors.

The 2015 Foire de Paris again ran for 12 days from 29 April 2015, with 200,000 square metres (2,200,000 sq ft) of retain area, equivalent to twenty hypermarkets. Admission cost €13 at the door. There were 3,500 exhibitors and 1,800 brands organized into five sections: Home & habitat, World Crafts and Culture, Wine and Gastronomy, Beauty and Wellness, Leisure and Practical Life. The Home section usually accounts for 70% of the sales by value, typically offering discounts of 15%, and in some cases up to 40%.

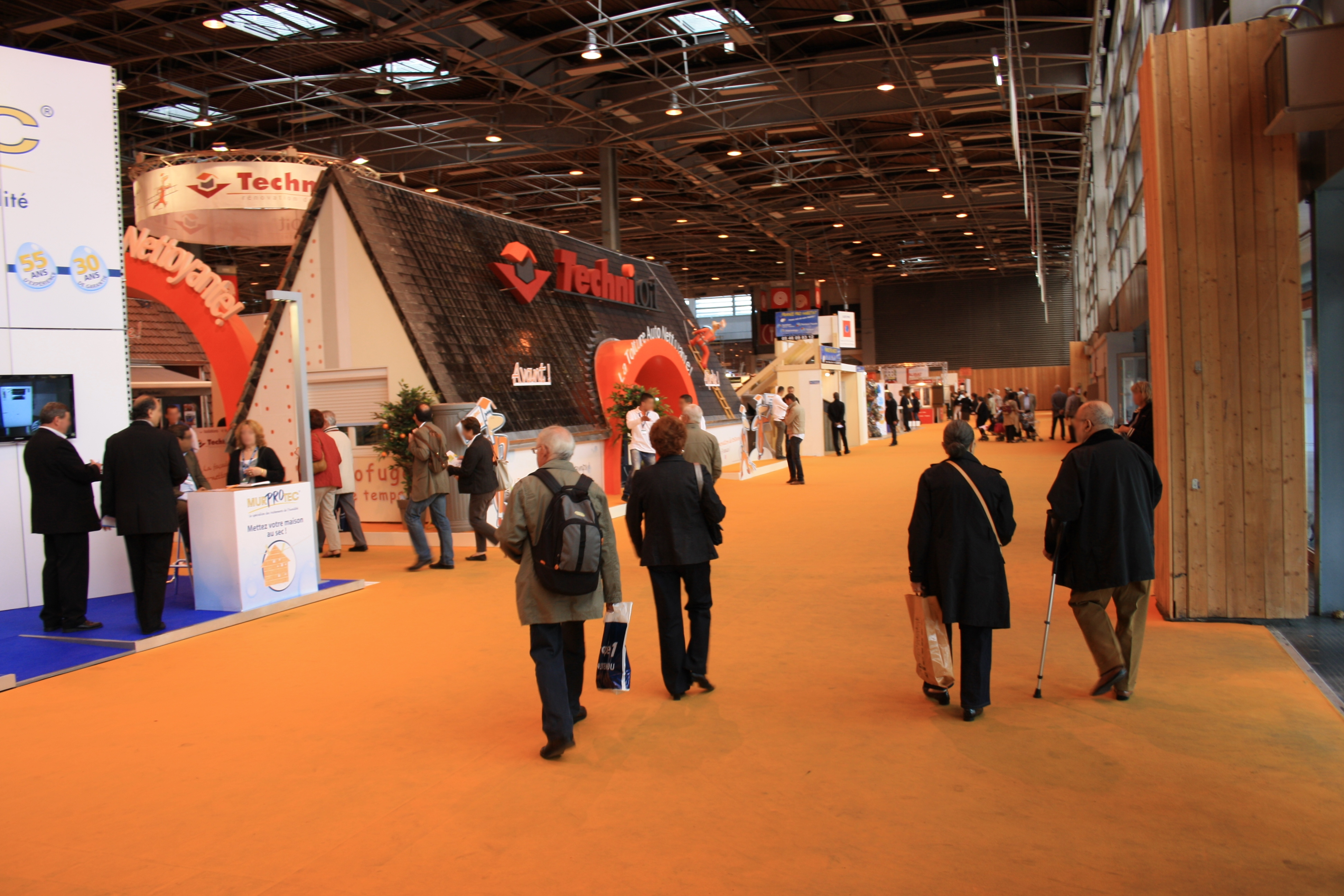
2011 Floor

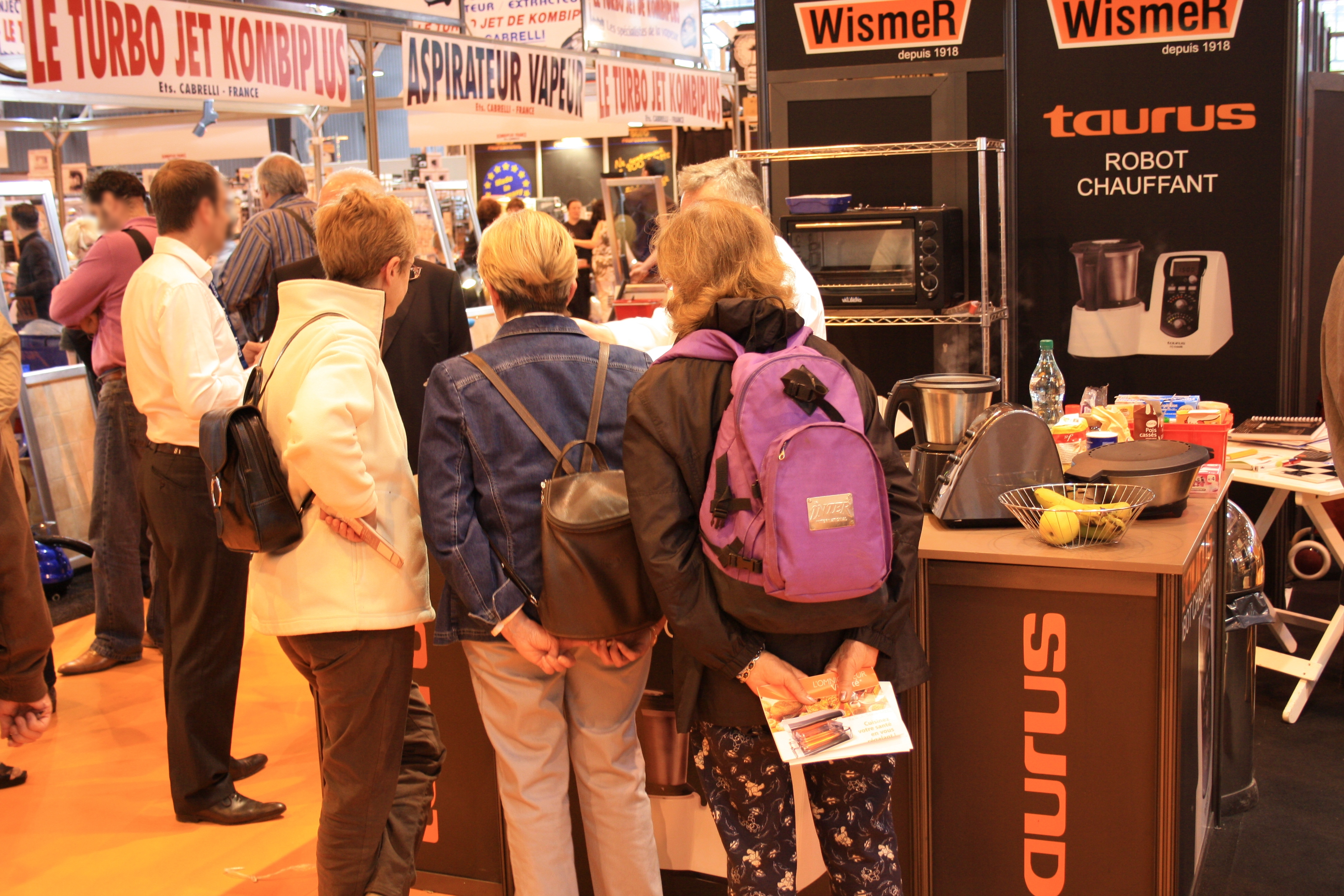
2011 Home appliances

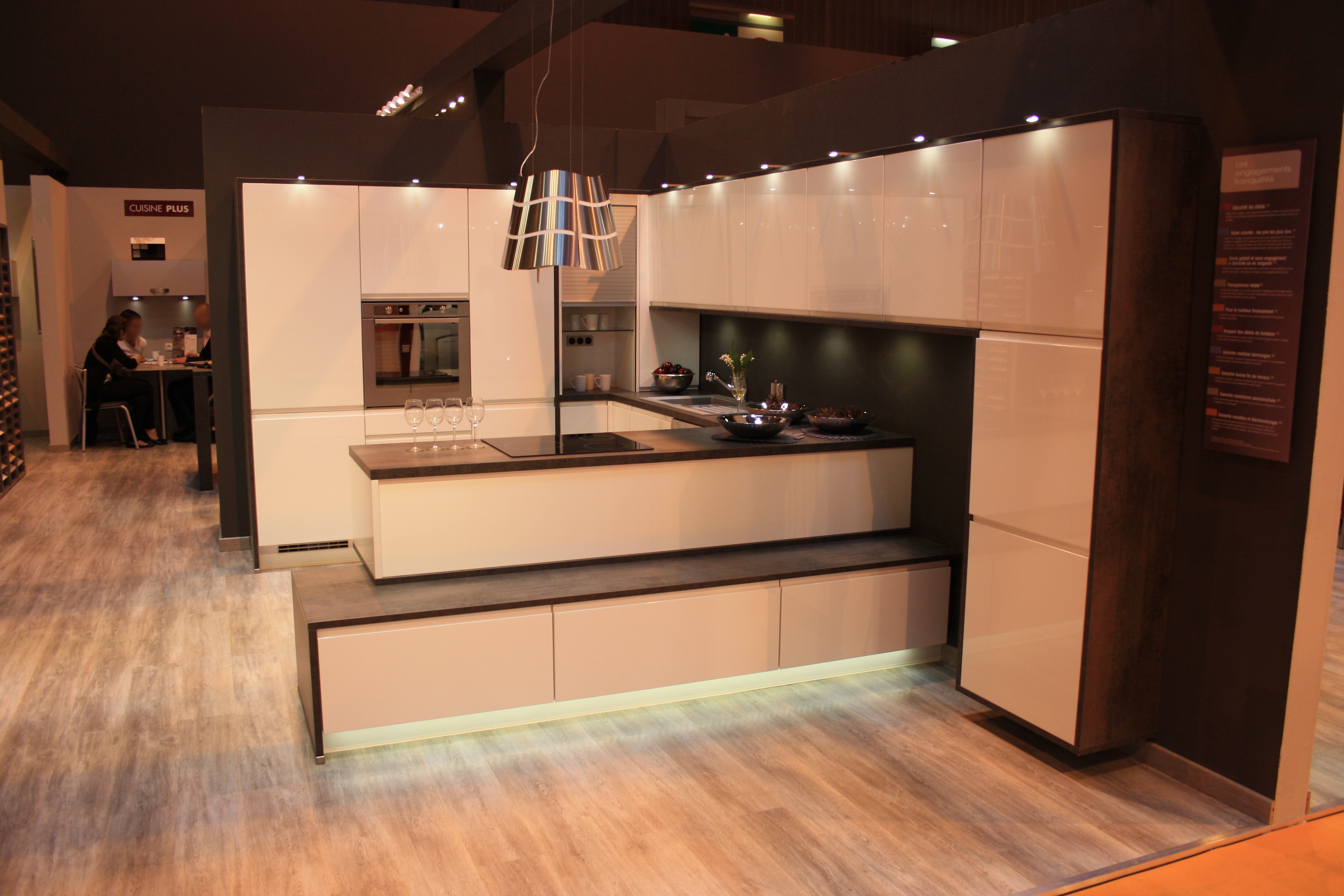
2011 Kitchen display

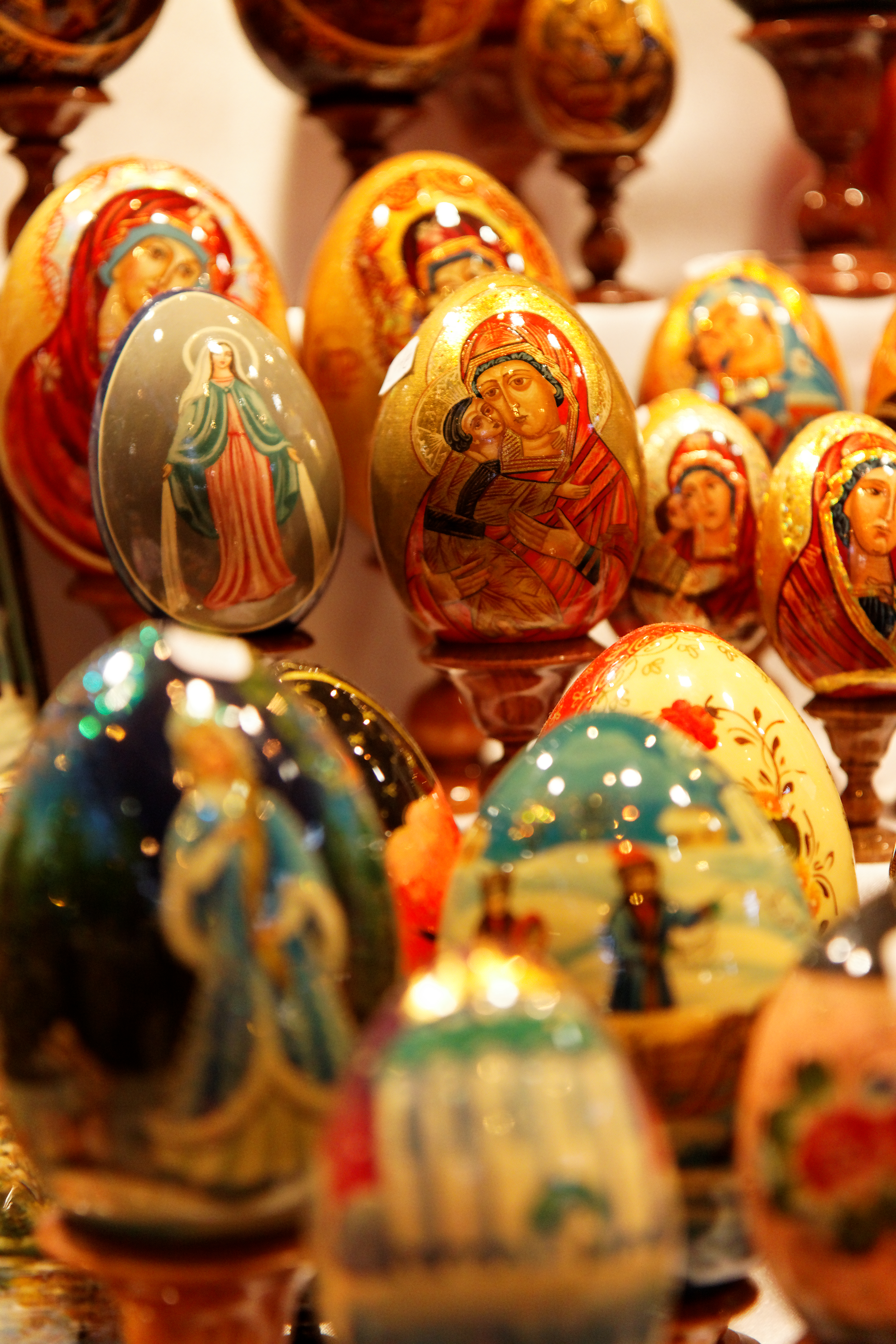
2011 Russian Crafts

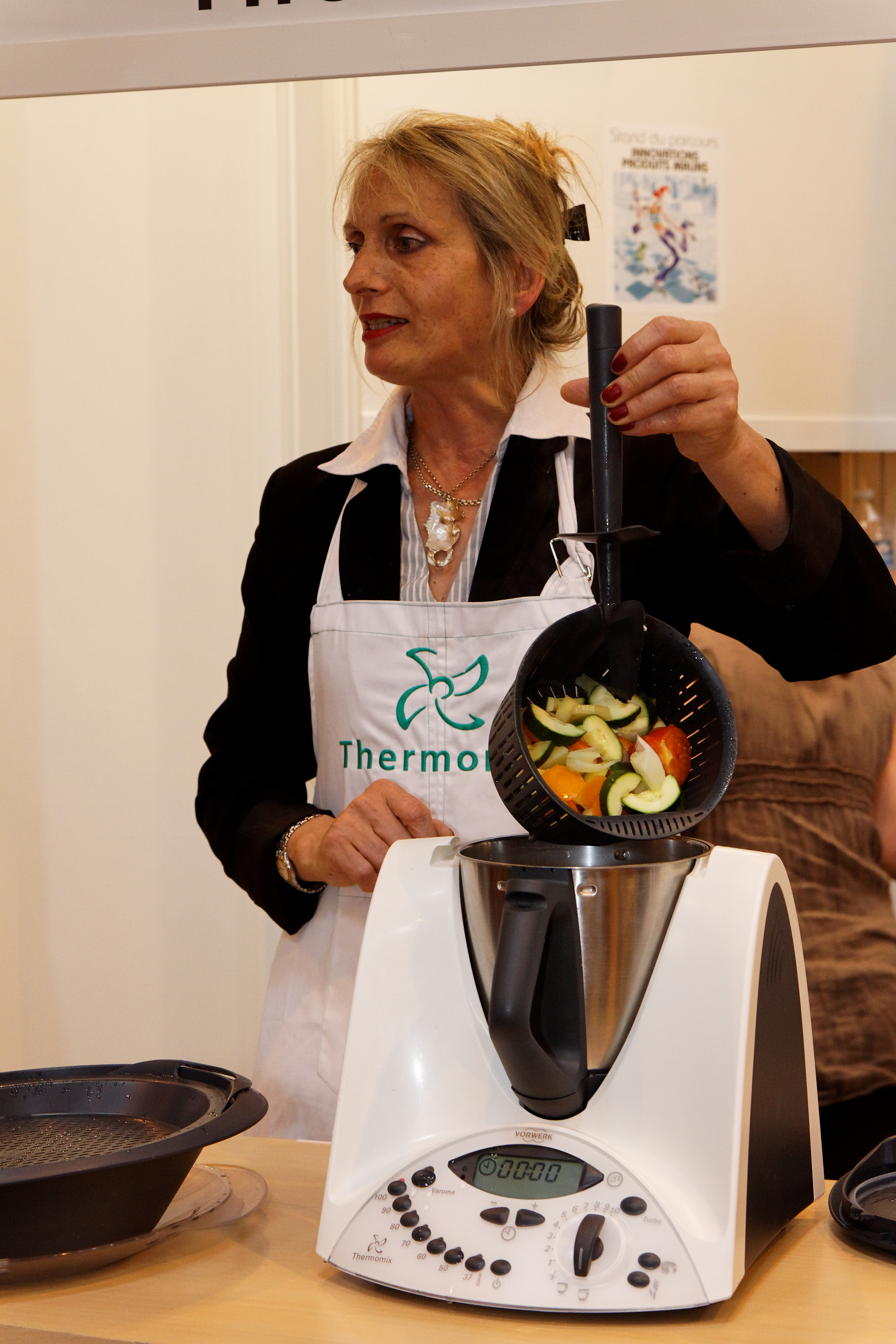
2011 appliance demonstration

== See also ==
- Foire de Lyon

== Sources ==
- "620.000 visiteurs à la Foire de Paris". Le Figaro. 2012-05-09.
- Jé. M. avec AFP (2015-04-29). "La 111e édition de la Foire de Paris en chiffres". BFMTV.
- "La grande épopée de la Foire de Paris". Foire de Paris.
- "La grande époque (1926-1940)". Foire de Paris.
- "La recherche d'un second souffle (1956-1968)". Foire de Paris.
- "La reprise (1945-1955)". Foire de Paris.
- Lenormand, Paul (2008). La Chambre de commerce et d'industrie de Paris, 1803-2003: Etudes thématiques. II. Librairie Droz. ISBN 978-2-600-01148-8.
- "Les Vertes Années (1904-1925)". Foire de Paris. Archived from the original on 2015-03-22.
- Leymonerie, Claire (2006). "Le Salon des arts ménagers dans les années 1950". Vingtième Siècle. Revue d'histoire (in French). 3 (91). Presses de Sciences Po (P.F.N.S.P.).
- Olivia Detroyat; Annelot Huijgen (2015-04-29). "À la Foire de Paris, les visiteurs dépensent malgré la crise". Le Figaro.
- "Salons des Appareils Ménagers". Les Arts Décoratifs (in French).
- "Un nouveau visage (1969-1987)". Foire de Paris.
