= We are fed up =

Series of demonstrations in Germany

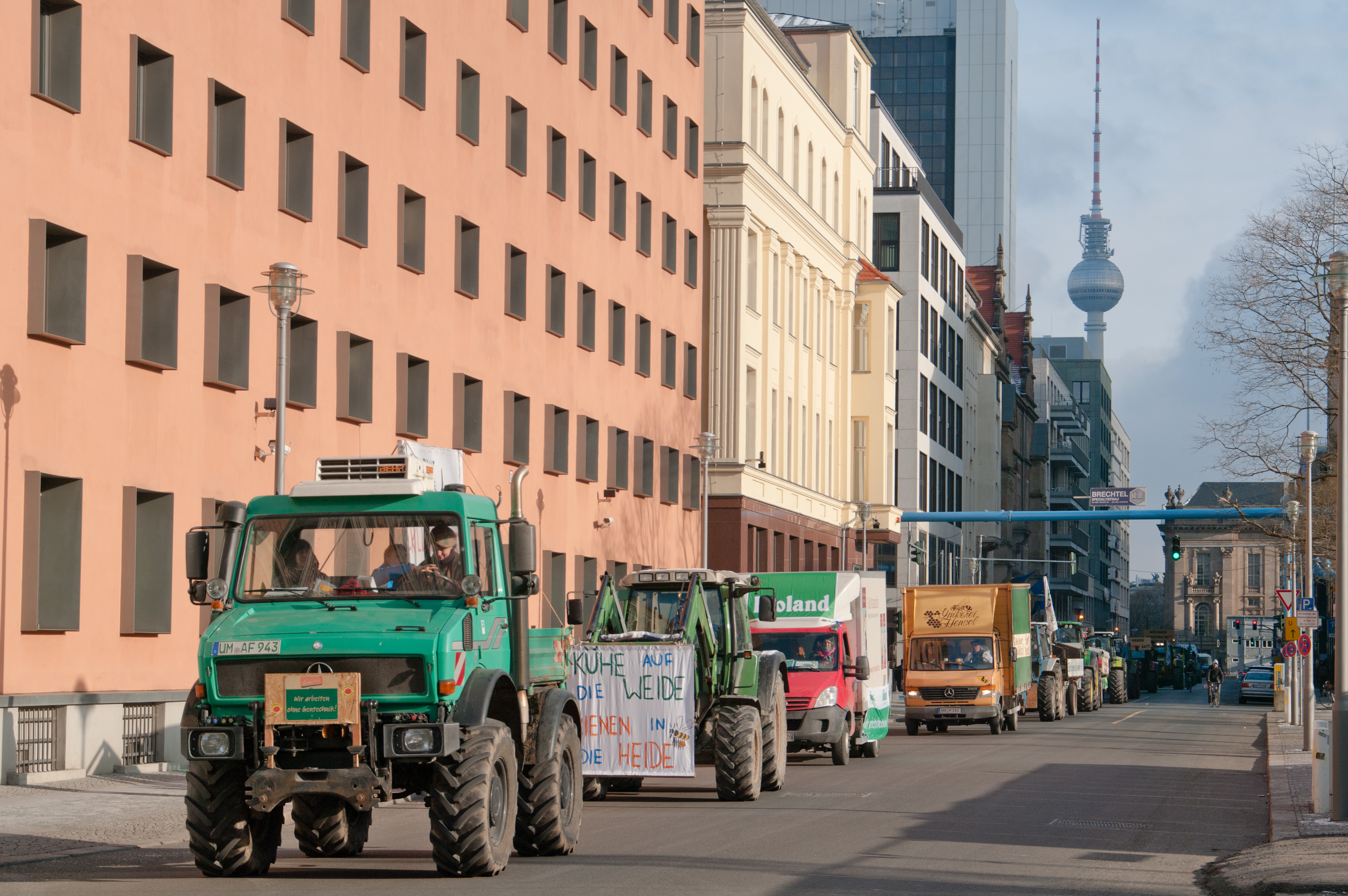
Protests in 2013, Berlin

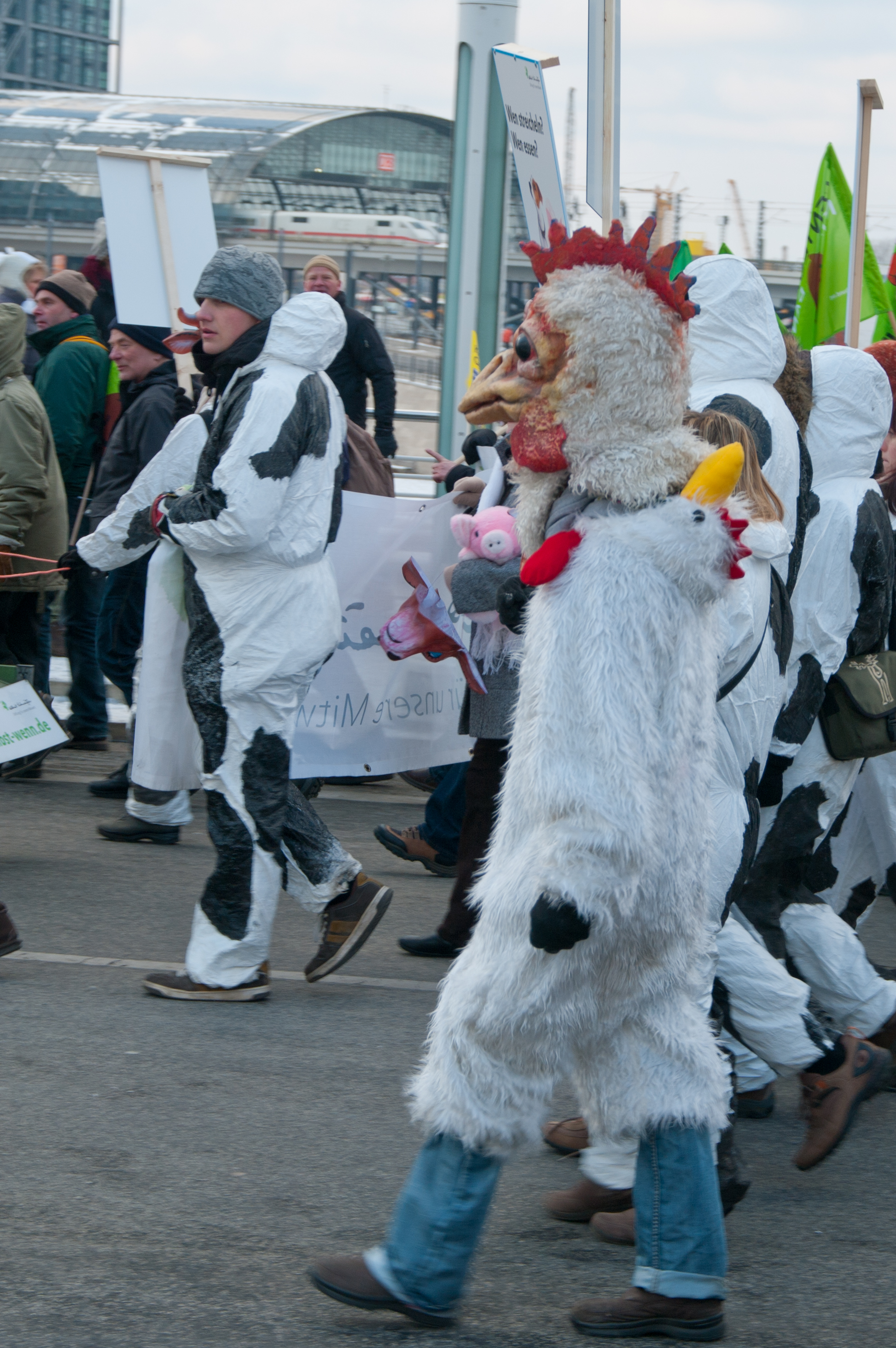
Protests in 2013, Berlin

We are fed up! (German: Wir haben es satt!) is the theme of a series of demonstrations in Germany against industrial livestock production and for more sustainable farming. The biggest demonstrations take place every year in Berlin since 2011 and attract up to 30,000 people. Around 120 different groups, which represent farmers, companies, and environmental rights and animal rights activists organize and sustain the demonstrations. The protests take place parallel to the Berlin International Green Week.

== Overview ==
Independent from the protests in Berlin, demonstrations under a similar theme occurred in Amsterdam in 2012 and 2013. The event in the Netherlands was called we zijn het MEGA zat, which translates to "we are MEGA fed up" and is a reference to the scale of industrial livestock farming.

== Gallery ==
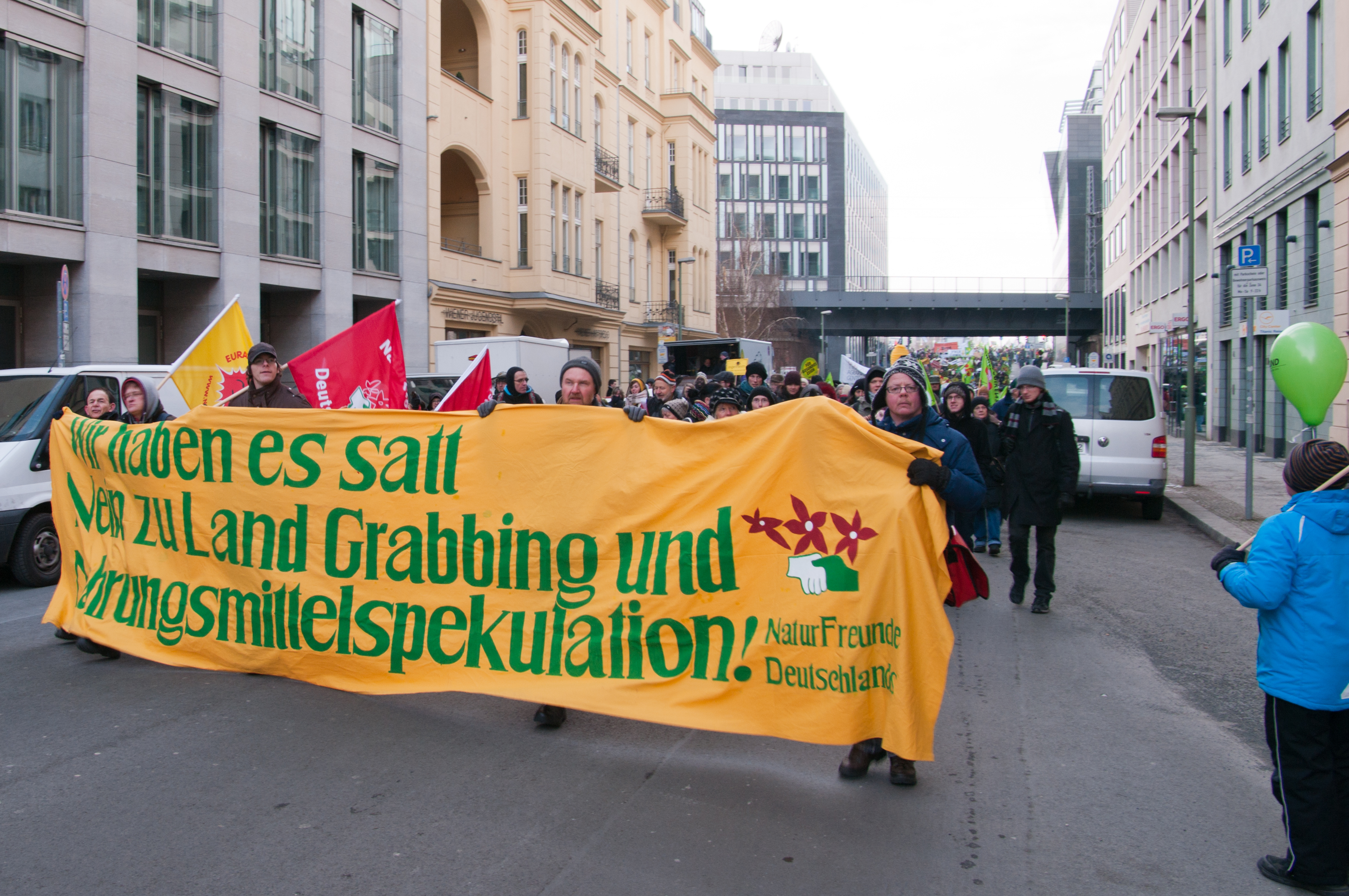
Protesters who say no to land grabbing and food speculation (Berlin, 2013)

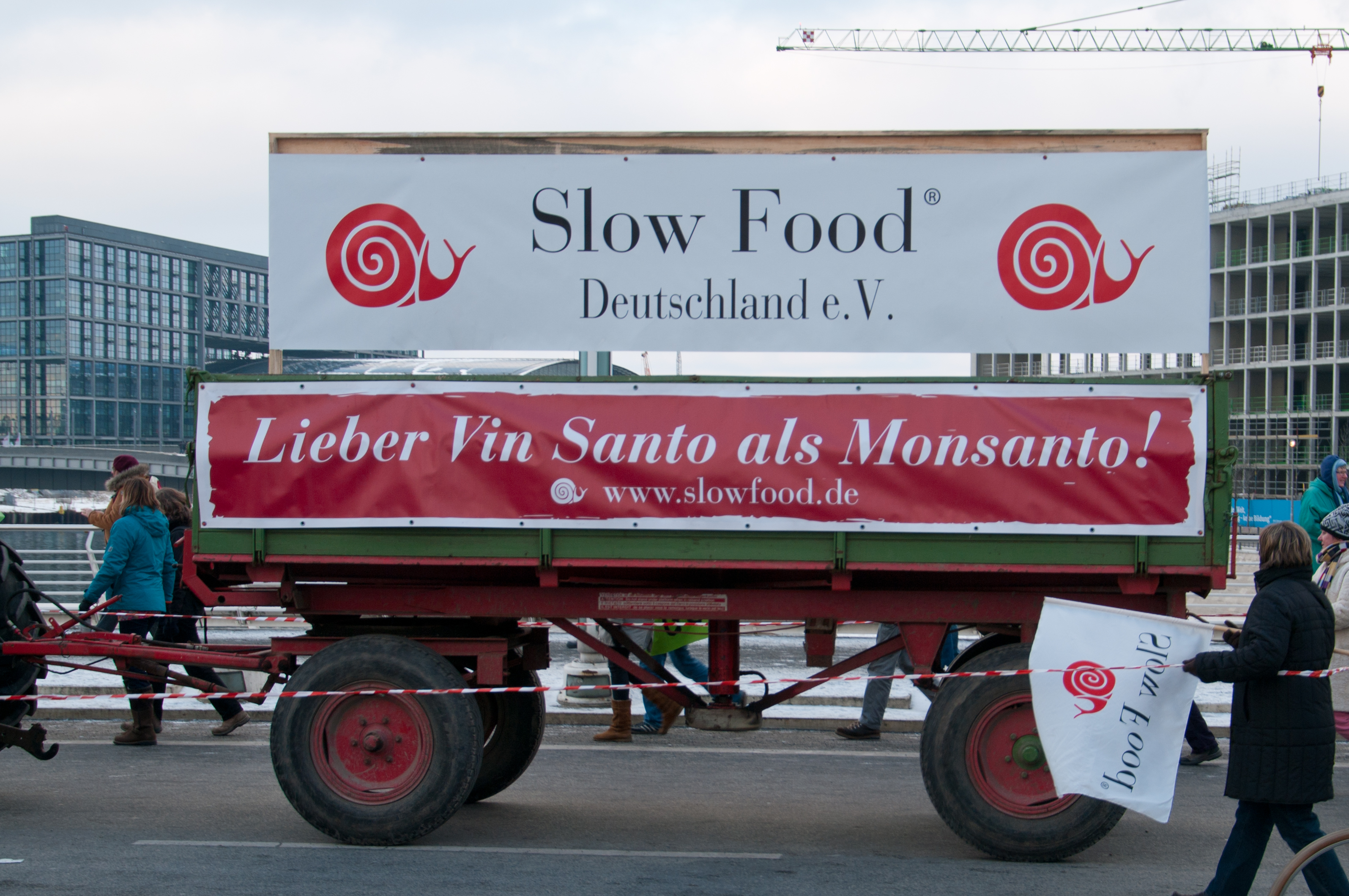
Slow Food Germany is among the organizers of the protests (Berlin, 2013).

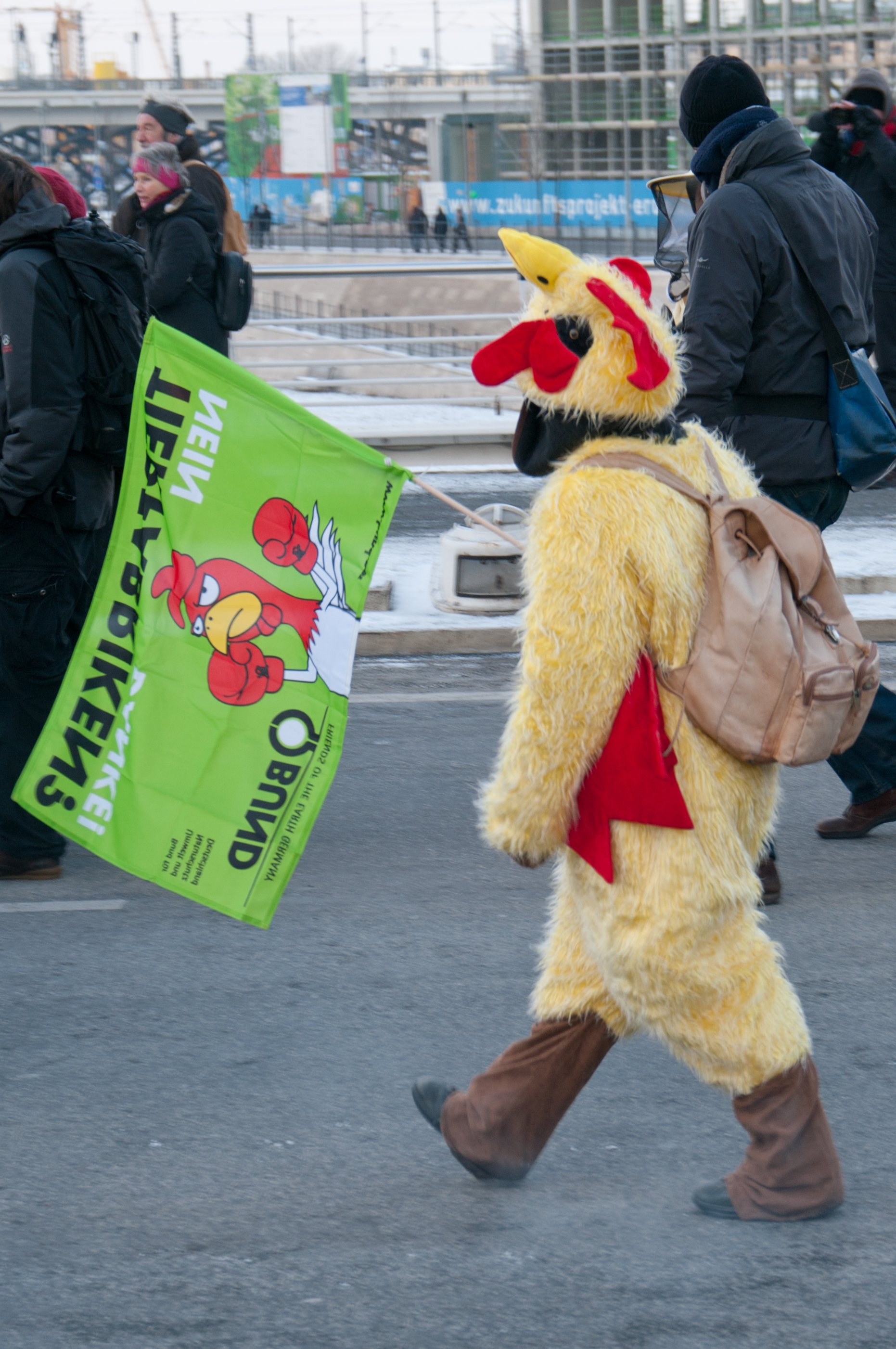
We are fed up! protester (Berlin, 2013)

== See also ==
- Meat Atlas – Facts and figures about the animals we eat
