= Paris International Agricultural Show =

Annual agricultural show and trade fair in Paris, France

Paris International Agricultural Show Salon international de l'agriculture
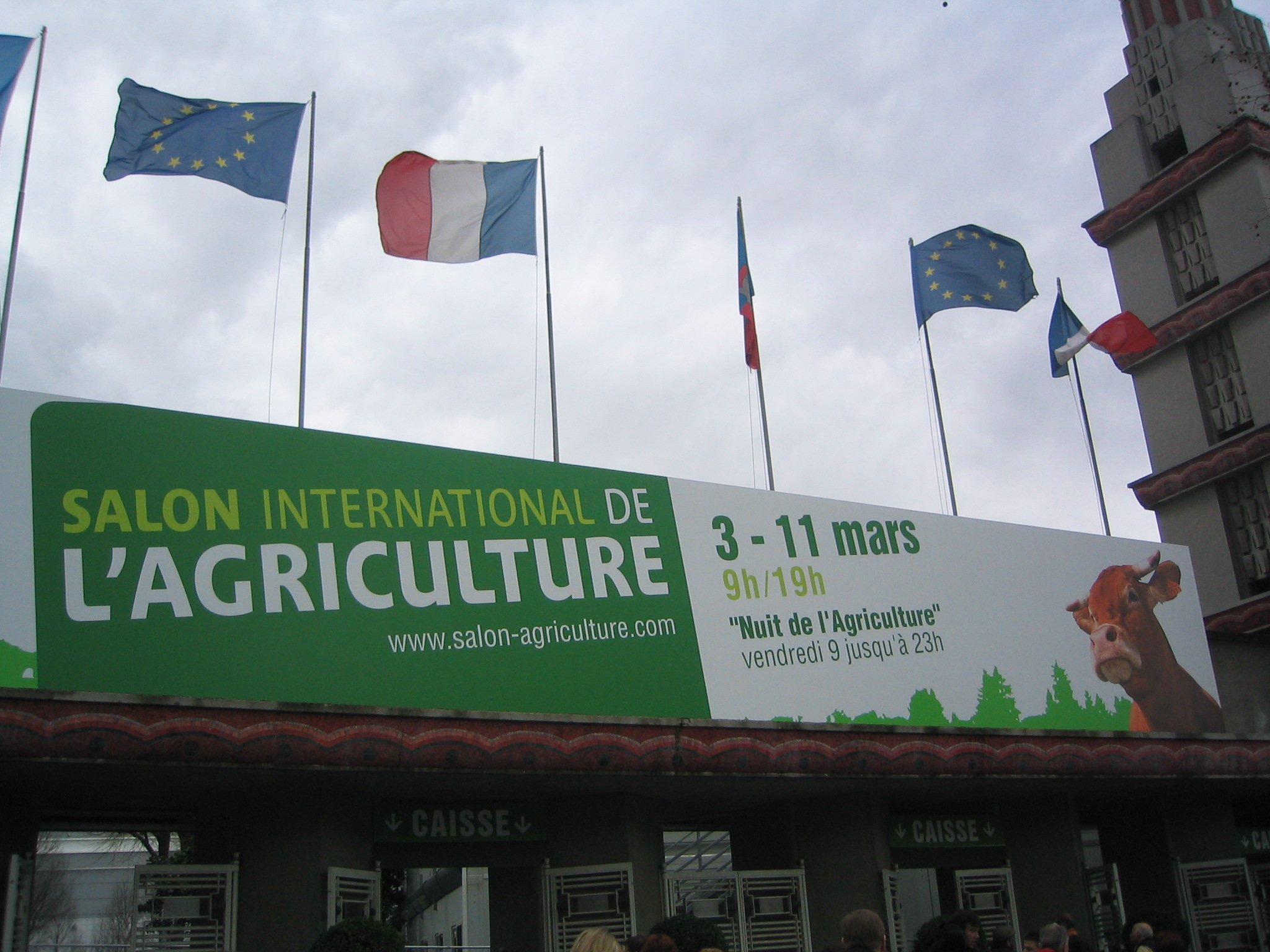
- Entrance of the Paris Agricultural Show 2007
- Status: active
- Genre: Trade fair
- Begins: Last week in February
- Ends: First week in March
- Frequency: Annually
- Venue: Paris expo Porte de Versailles
- Location: Paris
- Coordinates: 48.832222°N 2.284167°E
- Country: France
- Years active: 156
- Inaugurated: 1870 (first modern version 1964)
- Most recent: February–March 2023
- Participants: ca. 1,000 (2022)
- Attendance: 502,757 (2022)
- Area: 138,000 m^{2} (1,490,000 sq ft)(2014)
- Organiser: Comexposium
- Website: www.salon-agriculture.com

The Paris International Agricultural Show (French: Salon International de l'Agriculture, or SIA) is an annual agricultural show and trade fair, that takes place at the end of February or beginning of March at the Paris expo Porte de Versailles in Paris, France. It is one of the world's largest and most important agricultural shows, drawing larger crowds than any other in Paris except the Foire de Paris.

== History ==
This event was first held in 1870 as the Concours général agricole (CGA, "General Agricultural Show"). Its name was changed in 1964, but the Concours still exists and is one of the fair's main attractions.

Number	Year	Dates		Location	Exhibitors	Visitors	Notes
44	2007	3 March	11 March	Paris expo Porte de Versailles	1,120		(Note: The show was opened by Jacques Chirac. Under new management, it covered 138,000 square metres (1,490,000 square feet) with 1,120 exhibitors and 3,800 animals. Among the exhibitors from 80 countries, Russia, Japan and Syria were represented for the first time. The show was marked by a return to normal levels of attendance after the avian flu crisis of the previous year, and by the visits of the main presidential candidates, which has become almost obligatory in an election year.)
45	2008	23 February	2 March	Paris expo Porte de Versailles	1,017	608,372	(Note: As always, it included the Concours général agricole: there were 35 official visits and 200 visits by foreign delegations.)
49	2012	25 February	4 March	Paris expo Porte de Versailles	1,000	680,200	
50	2013	22 February	4 March	Paris expo Porte de Versailles	1,300	693,752	(Note: Representation from 37 countries, 917 exhibitors showed 2,300 animals, Seven animal families were represented, cows, sheep, goats, pigs, horses, donkeys and dogs, with 370 species and 1900 exhibitors, with 53 official visits.)
51	2014	22 February	2 March	Paris expo Porte de Versailles	1,300	703,407	(Note: 22 countries represented: 4,000 animals split over 6 exhibition halls.)
52	2015	21 February	1 March	Paris expo Porte de Versailles	1,050	691,058	(Note: 3,859 animals represented over 6 exhibition halls.)
53	2016	27 February	6 March	Paris expo Porte de Versailles	1,200	611,015	
54	2017	25 February	5 March	Paris expo Porte de Versailles	ca. 1,000	618,958	
55	2018	24 February	4 March	Paris expo Porte de Versailles	ca. 1,000	672,568	
56	2019	23 February	3 March	Paris expo Porte de Versailles	ca. 1,000	633,213	
57	2020	22 February	29 February	Paris expo Porte de Versailles	ca. 1,000	483,221	
58 (cancelled)	2021	27 February	7 March	cancelled due to COVID-19 pandemic			
58	2022	26 February	6 March		ca. 1,000	502,757	
59	2023	25 February	5 March				

=== Effect of COVID-19 Pandemic ===
In 2020, the coronavirus pandemic forced the event to close a day earlier than anticipated on 29 February.

The CENECA's president Jean-Luc Poulain announced the cancellation of the 2021 event, initially planned from 27 February to 7 March. Valérie Le Roy, head of the event, is looking into other ways to represent and promote agriculture, a key sector of the French economy.

== Structure ==
This show is organised on several themed zones (cows, goats, sheep, exotic animals, gastronomy, etc.) in different buildings (there are 8 exhibition halls) at the Paris expo Porte de Versailles.

=== Themed zones ===
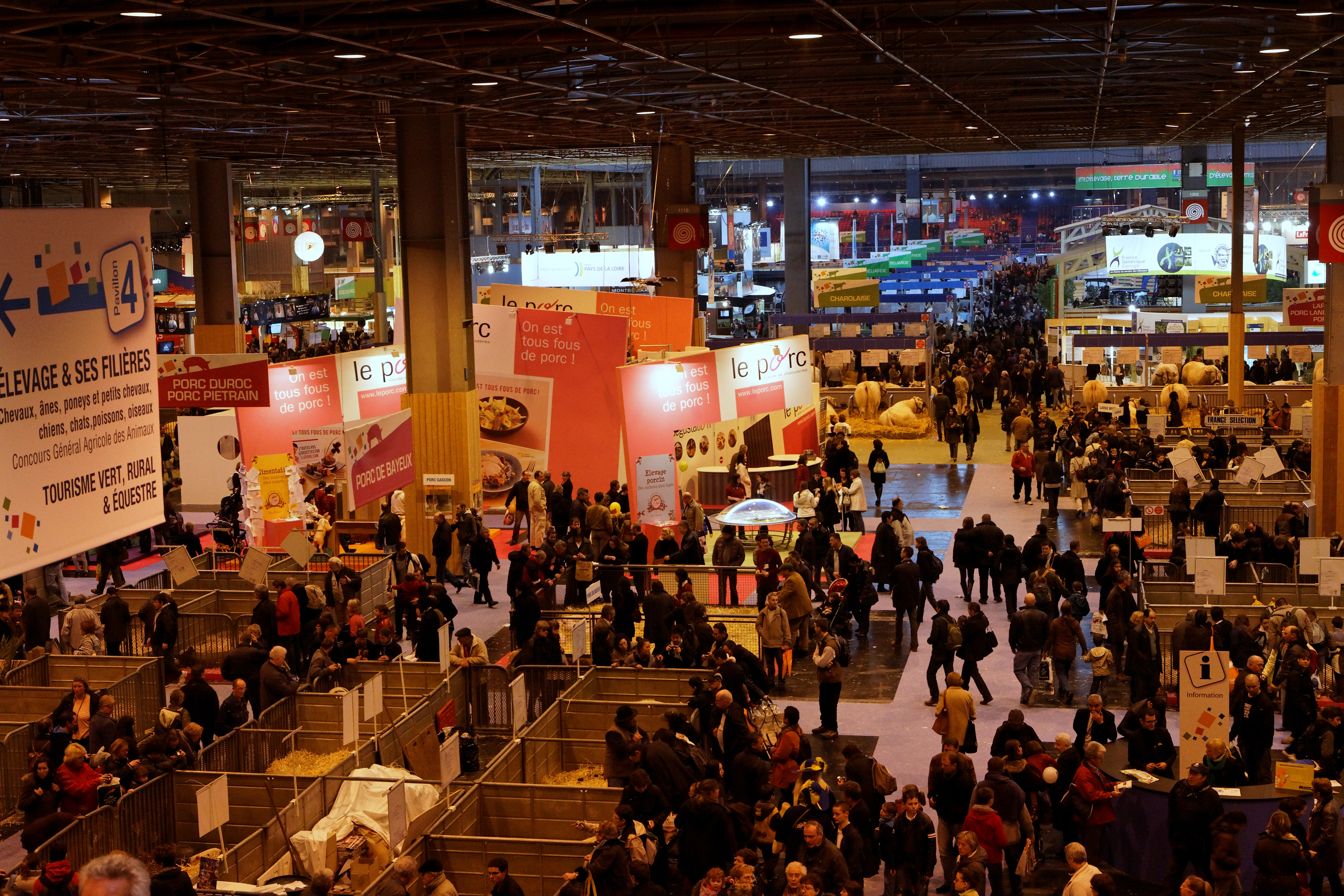
2011

In 2015 the stands were grouped into four zones:

1. Élevages et ses filières ("Livestock and related sectors"): This zone houses a representative gathering of animals from the 360 exhibited species. At the 2014 show there was a total of more than 3,850 animals in this zone.
2. Produits gastronomiques ("Food products"): This sector represents the food culture of 18 different countries from around the world as well as from the different regions of France.
3. Cultures et filières végétales ("Vegetable crops and related sectors"): Here were exhibited vegetable crops, especially from the cereal sector which is very important in France. This section also informed the public of new trends in gardening as well as providing activities and entertainment for all ages.
4. Services et métiers de l'agriculture ("Agricultural trade services"): This was run by the French Ministry of Agriculture, Agrifood, and Forestry, which is a major player in the development of agriculture and agricultural training in France.

Since 2010, the show has established thematic guided tours which varied from day to day, depending on whether they were targeted for schoolchildren or trade visitors. In 2013, ten thematic guided tours were offered to visitors, one of which was a special golden jubilee tour.

=== Related shows ===
Every two years (odd-numbered years), the Salon international du machinisme agricole (SIMA, "Paris International Agribusiness Show") is held simultaneously at the Parc des expositions de Paris-Nord at Villepinte, Seine-Saint-Denis. Entrance is restricted to those working in the agriculture or forestry

On the alternate (even-numbered) years, the Salon du fromage et des produits laitiers ("Cheese and Dairy Products Show") is held. It is the largest showcase for cheesemaking know-how. With 150 exhibitors and 5,997 visitors (of which 20% were from abroad), this is a major trade fair for cheesemongers and buyers of cheese and dairy products.

=== Organisers ===
The show is organised by the CENECA (French: Centre national des expositions et des concours agricoles, "National Centre for Agricultural Shows and Trade Fairs"), in partnership with the French Ministry of Agriculture, Agrifood, and Forestry. The French Minister of Agriculture is ultimately responsible for decision-making; its opening and closing dates are fixed by ministerial decree.

CENECA brings together various professional organizations in the agricultural world, agri-food and communities. The city of Paris and the government are the ultimate backers of the show. Although CENECA sets the general strategy, it subcontracts operational matters to Comexposium. Official visits are arranged and managed directly by the CENECA. Jean-Luc Poulain is the current president of the CENECA and of the show.

==== Comexposium ====
Comexposium is one of Europe's leading exhibition organizers. It is a joint venture wholly owned subsidiary of the Paris Chamber of Commerce and Industry and Unibail-Rodamco, Comexposium organizes around 114 public and trade events per year, including five of the ten largest French fairs.

== Politics and media ==
The mass media play an important role in publicising the show, with stands taken by Public Sénat, Campagne TV, France 3 and France Ô Visits by the French President, and the leaders of the French political parties, is usually covered. Politicians take the opportunity to reach out to the general public to debate the issues of the day, in an attempt to seem more "down to earth", and improve their party image.

The media coverage allows the show to be followed by the public. Because of this, it has gained international recognition. It allows the French government to present its agricultural sector to its European neighbours and campaign for the Common Agricultural Policy, which aids French farmers through subsidies and provides monetary incentives to farmers who help protect the rural environment.

== See also ==
- Berlin International Green Week
