= Grise du Marais Poitevin =

French breed of goose

- Conservation status: FAO (2007): not listed; DAD-IS (2026): unknown
- Other names: Oie Grise du Marais Poitevin
- Country of origin: France
- Distribution: former province of Poitou; Nouvelle-Aquitaine (Charentes)
- Use: meat

Traits
- Colour: grey

Classification
- APA: no
- EE: no
- PCGB: no
- Goose; Anser anser

The Grise du Marais Poitevin or Oie Grise du Marais Poitevin is a French breed of goose originating in the historical province of Poitou in western France. It is grey, with orange-yellow bill and orange, yellow or pink shanks, and is thus distinct from the other goose breed of Poitou, the white Oie du Poitou.

Like most other domestic geese, it derives from the wild species Anser anser.

== History ==
The Grise du Marais Poitevin was bred in the historical region and former province of Poitou in western France – which corresponds principally to the modern départements of Deux-Sèvres, the Vendée or Bas-Poitou and the Vienne or Haut-Poitou – and in the Charentes in Nouvelle-Aquitaine.

It was formerly reared in large numbers in the Marais Poitevin – particularly in the Vendée, in Deux-Sèvres and in Charente-Maritime – for meat, for feathers and for down.

As happened with the Oie du Poitou, numbers declined sharply with the advent of synthetic materials; by 1992 only two breeders remained. A conservation programme was started by the Parc Naturel Régional du Marais Poitevin in 1993. In 2000 the Conservatoire des Ressources Génétiques du Centre-Ouest Atlantique was established in Coulon to conserve seven animal breeds of the marshes, including both the white and the grey goose; the other breeds included were the Baudet du Poitou, the Poitevin breed of horse, the Poitevin mule, the Poitevine breed of goat, the Lapin-chèvre breed of rabbit and the Marans and Barbezieux chickens.

The Grise du Marais Poitevin is not recognised by the national Fédération Française des Volailles of France, and is not listed by the Entente Européenne d'Aviculture et de Cuniculture. No population data has ever been reported to DAD-IS. A census by the Conservatoire des Ressources Génétiques du Centre-Ouest Atlantique found a total of 127 birds of both sexes, while a census by the Institut National de la Recherche Agronomique in 2014 found 50 (female) geese.

== Characteristics ==
It is of medium size: body weights are usually between as 4 and 5 kg, but not more than 4.5 kg for geese. It is always grey, with orange-yellow bill and orange, yellow or pink shanks. the eyes are brown and ringed with orange or pink. The birds stand about 70 cm tall and have a wingspan of some 160 cm.

== Use ==
It is reared for meat, for feathers and for down.
