= List of French goose breeds =

This is a list of the goose breeds usually considered to be of French origin. Some may have complex or obscure histories, so inclusion here does not necessarily imply that a breed is predominantly or exclusively from France.

Name(s)	English name if used	Notes	Image
Oie Blanche du Bourbonnais			
Oie Blanche du Poitou			
Oie d'Alsace	Alsatian	three colour varieties, grey, white and grey-and-white	
Oie de Bresse			
Oie de Castres			
Oie de la Meuse			
Oie des Landes; Grise des Landes			
Oie de Toulouse	Toulouse	two types, sans bavette or agricultural and à bavette or industrial	
Oie de Touraine			
Oie de type Bavent			
Oie Flamande		two varieties, white and bi-colopured	
Oie Grise du Marais Poitevin			
Oie Normande		two varieties, crested and not	
