= Mammoth donkey =

The term mammoth donkey or mammoth jack is both an informal term for a large male donkey and a term sometimes applied generically to some specific large donkey breeds or landraces.

- The American mammoth donkey or mammoth jack
- The baudet de Poitou or Poitevin donkey
