= Romulus (donkey) =

Tallest living donkey

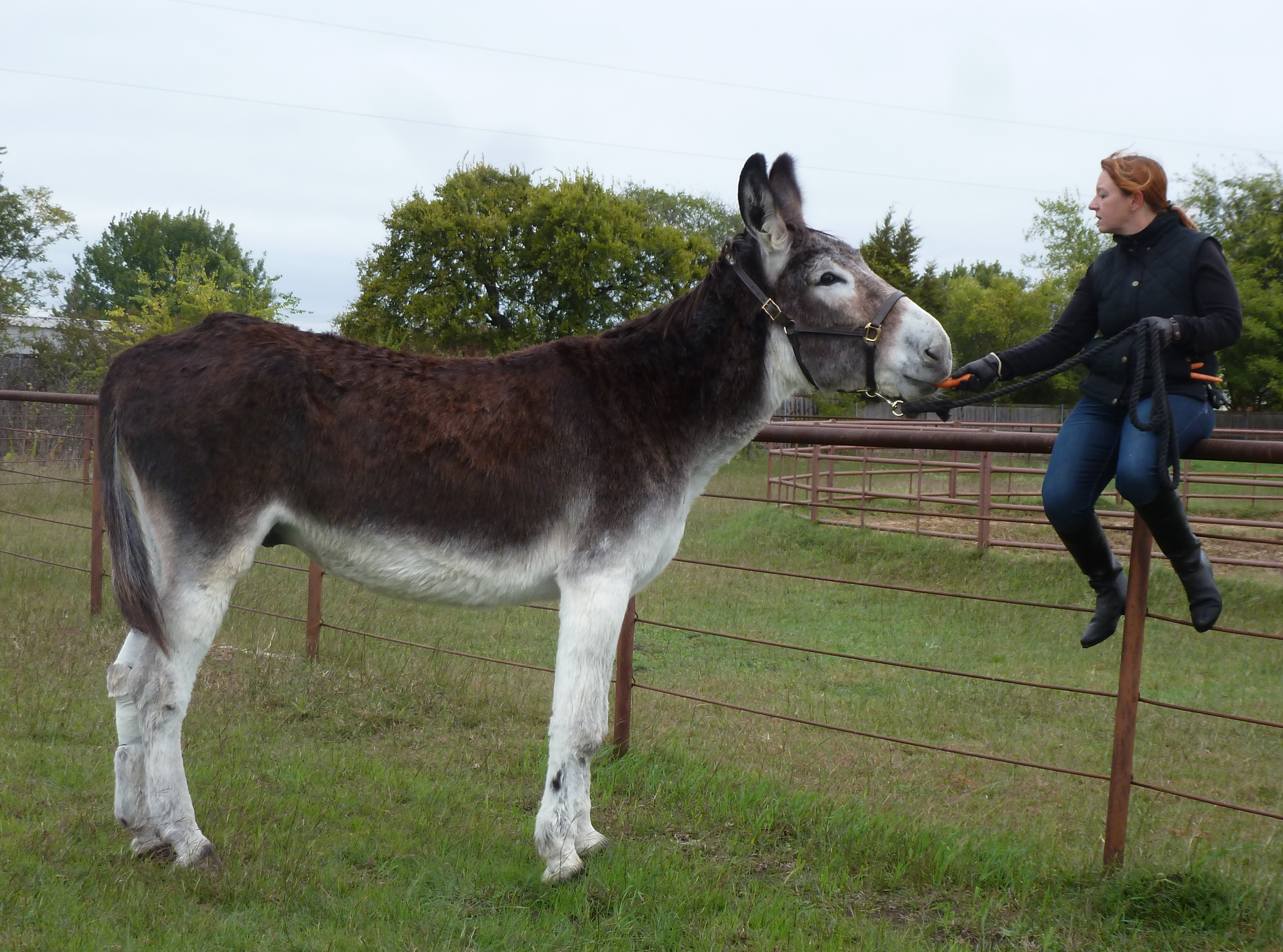
- Romulus and Cara - November 6, 2013
- Species: Donkey
- Breed: American Mammoth
- Sex: Male
- Born: 2004 (age 21–22)
- Title: World’s Tallest Donkey
- Predecessor: Oklahoma Sam
- Successor: Dynamic Derrick
- Owners: Cara Barker Yellott and Phil Yellott
- Weight: 1,300 lb (590 kg)
- Height: 68 in (172.72 cm)

Romulus held the record as the world's tallest donkey, as certified by the Guinness World Records. He was just over 2 2/3 times as tall as KneeHi, the Guinness World Record holder for shortest donkey. He was owned by Phil and Cara Barker Yellott of Adrian, Michigan. Romulus was an American Mammoth Jackstock gelding. Romulus was the older of brother Remus, who was just 2 inches (50.8 mm) shorter.

== Overview ==
Romulus, born 2004, measured 17 hands (68 inches, 173 cm) from hooves to withers, and weighed about 1,300 pounds (590 kg). He was an American Mammoth Jackstock donkey, the world's largest donkey breed. American mammoths were developed and utilized for their potential to produce large mules when cross-bred with horses.

== Guinness World Record ==
On February 8, 2013, Romulus was measured for the Guinness Book of World Records. His paperwork was received in London and certified by Guinness World Records on May 13, 2013.

As of February 2025 the world record for tallest living donkey is held by Dynamic Derrick at 167 cm (66 in).
