= American Mammoth Jackstock =

Breed of donkey

American mammoth donkey
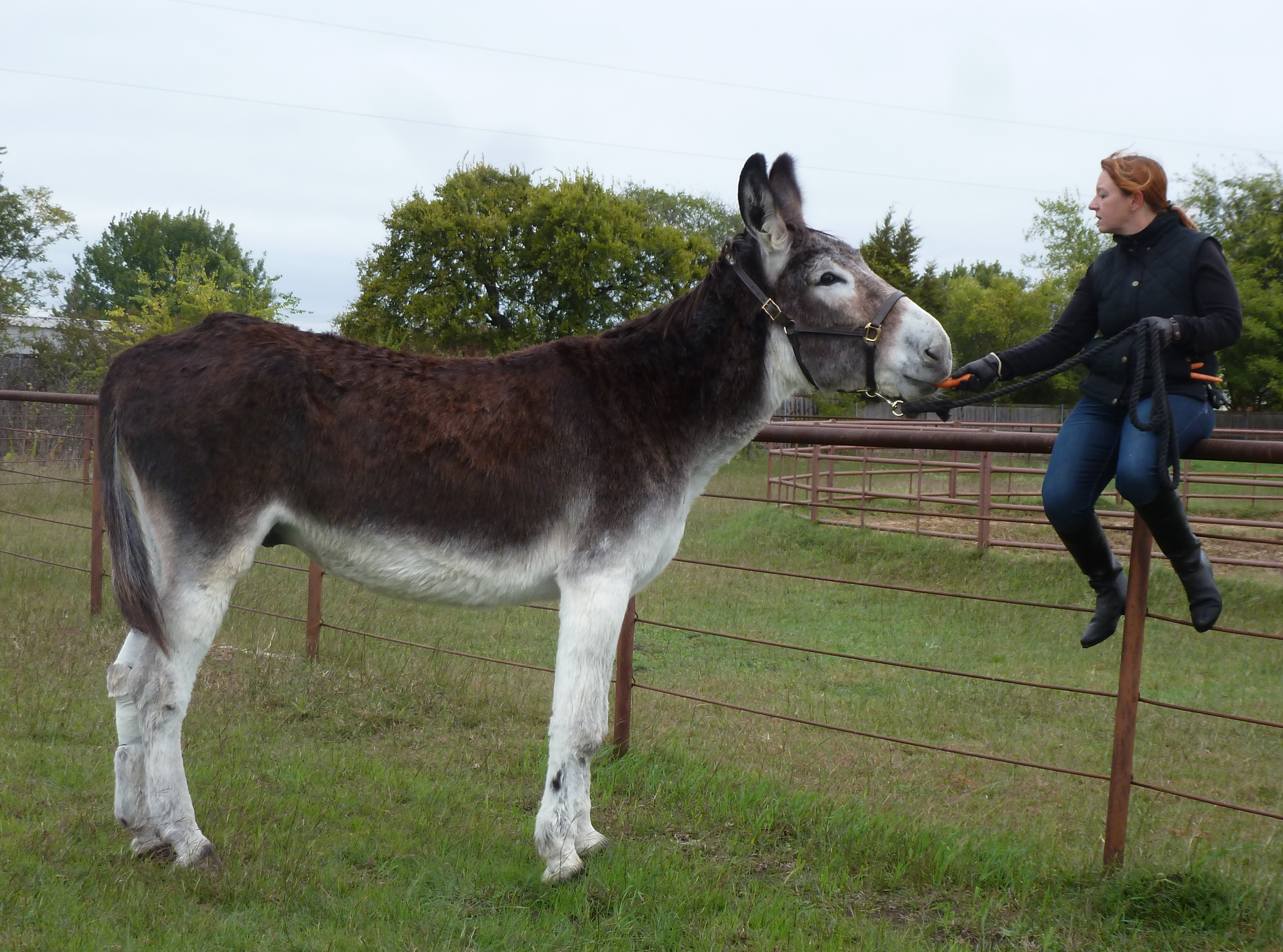
- Romulus and Cara - November 6, 2013
- Other names: Mammoth Jack (males)
- Country of origin: United States

The American Mammoth Jackstock is a breed of North American donkey, descended from large donkeys imported to the United States from about 1785. George Washington, with Henry Clay and others, bred for a large donkey that could be mated with horses to produce strong work mules. Washington was offering his jacks for stud service by 1788, while large donkeys were found in Kentucky by 1800. Breeds that influenced the Mammoth Jack include the Maltese, the Baudet du Poitou, the Andalusian, the Majorcan and the Catalan.

Measured from the ground to the withers, jacks (intact males) must stand at least 14 hands (56 inches, 142 cm), and jennies or jennets (females) at least 13.2 hands (54 inches, 137 cm) in order to be classified as mammoth size. The American Mammoth Jackstock Registry has more stringent requirements: minimum 14 hands and 7.5” cannon bone circumference for jennets and geldings; minimum 14.2 hands and 8” cannon bone circumference for jacks; 61” heart girth in all cases

The largest living mammoth donkey, at 17 hands (68 inches, 173 cm), resides in Adrian, Michigan.
