= KneeHi =

Shortest donkey

- Species: Donkey
- Sex: Male
- Born: October 2, 2007 (age 18); Gainesville, Florida
- Owners: James, Frankie and Ryan Lee
- Parents: Itsy Bitsy Annie, Golden Point's GP Billy Bob
- Height: 64.2 cm (2 ft 1.3 in)
- Awards: Guinness World Record for shortest living donkey

KneeHi is the shortest living donkey as certified by the Guinness World Records, at 24.29 inches tall measured to the top of the withers. KneeHi is a registered miniature Mediterranean donkey and lives at Best Friends Farm in Gainesville, Florida. He is owned by James, Frankie and Ryan Lee.

== Overview ==
KneeHi was introduced at the Georgia National Fair soon after his birth in 2007. In 2008 he won the trophy for "most loved exhibit". His great sire was GP Oscar who was known as the smallest known registered jack at 26.5 inches tall.

== Guinness World Record ==
KneeHi was added to the Guinness World Record registry on July 26, 2011. Craig Glenday, Guinness World Records Editor-in-Chief, was at the official measuring.
