= Poitevin mule =

Type of large mule from Poitou, France

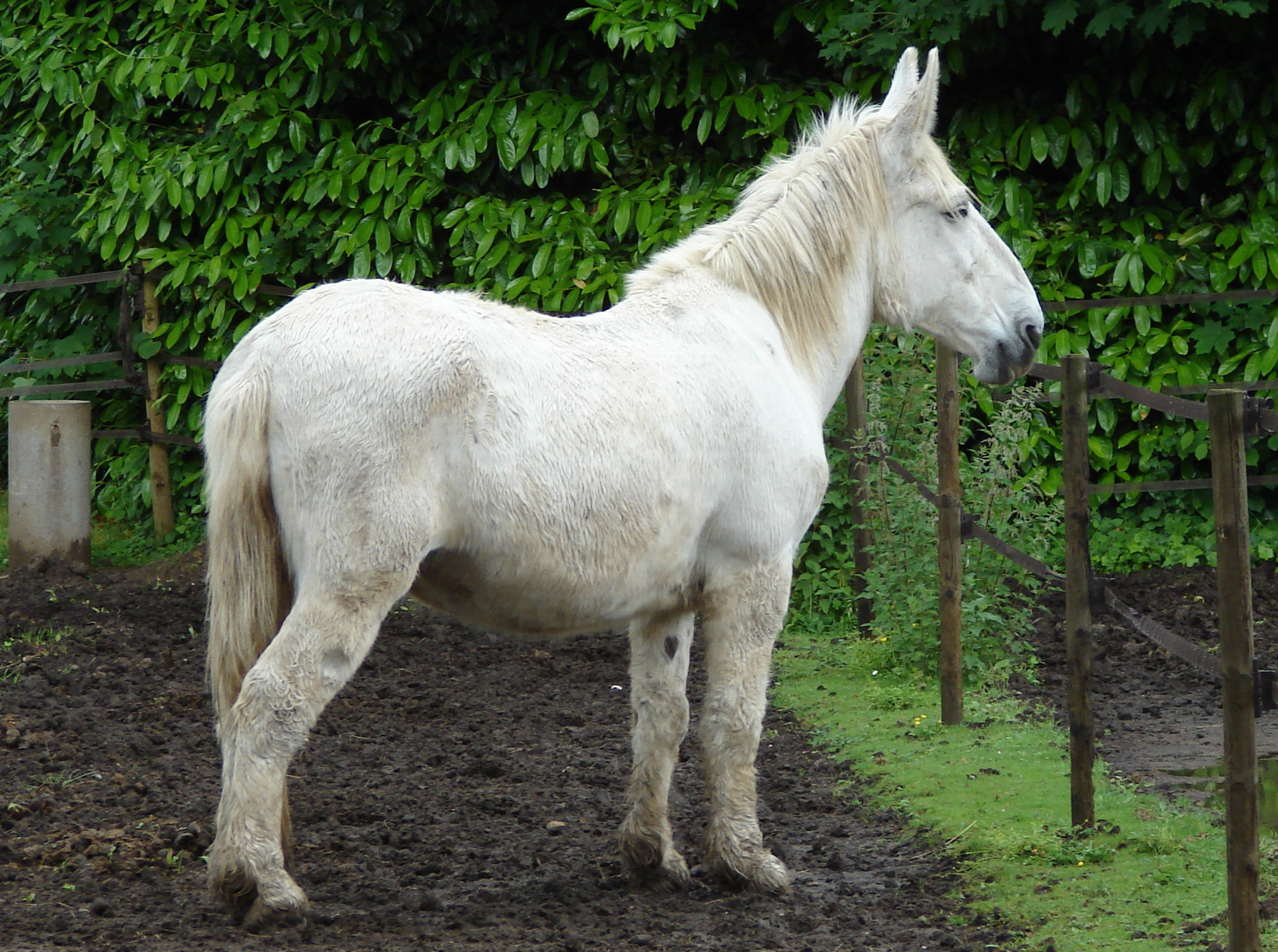
- Poitevin mule at the Haras National of Saintes, Poitou-Charentes
- Other names: Mule Poitevine
- Country of origin: France
- Distribution: Poitou

Traits
- Weight: 600–700 kg
- Height: 160–165 cm; may reach or exceed 170 cm
- Mule; Equus africanus asinus x Equus ferus caballus

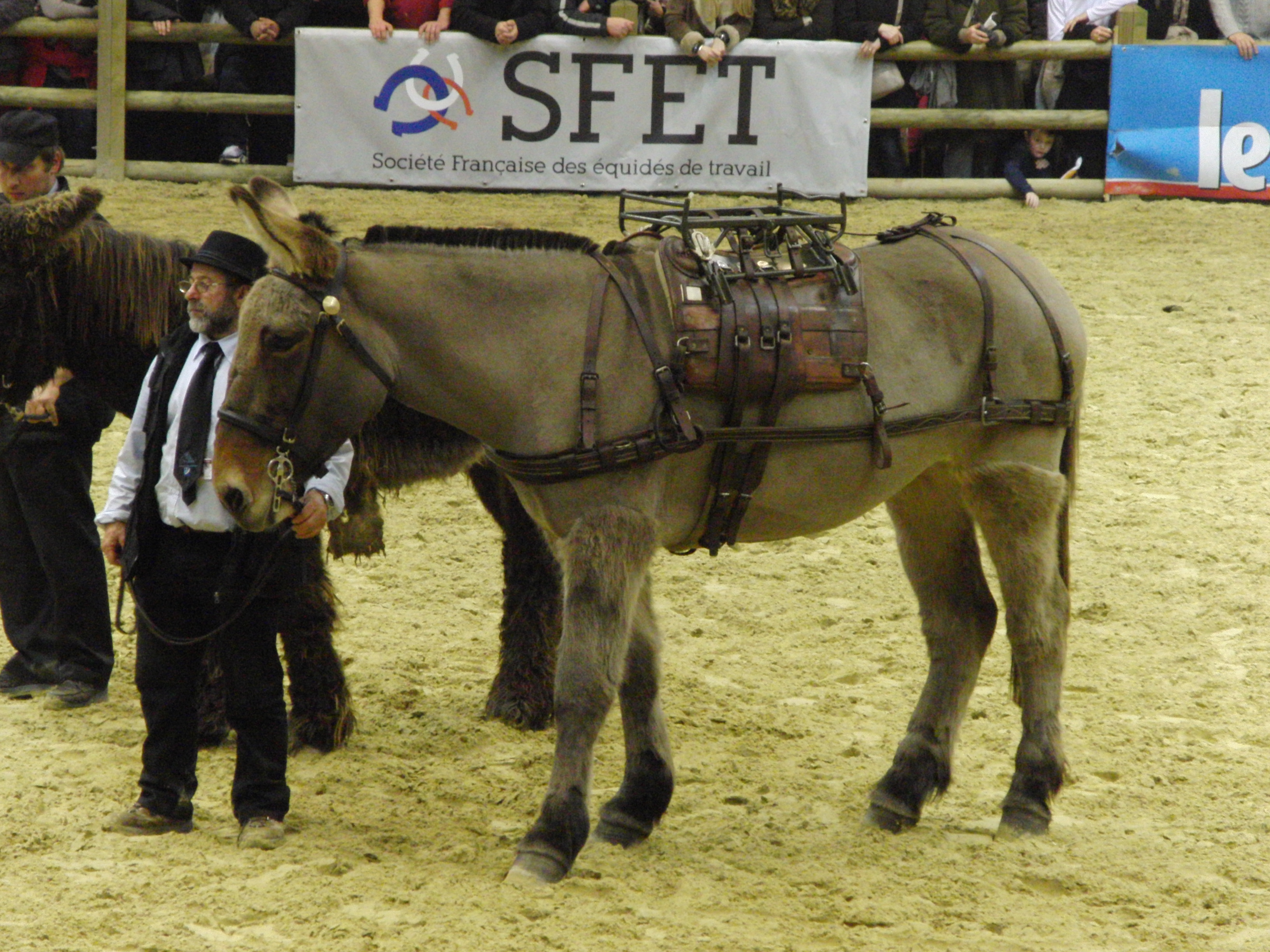
Poitevin mule with pack-saddle at the Salon International de l'Agriculture in Paris in 2013

The Poitevin mule or French: mule Poitevine is a type of large mule from the former province of Poitou in western central France. It is the product of mating between a Baudet du Poitou jack or donkey stallion with a mare of the Poitevin Mulassier breed of draught horse. Mule production was an important industry in Poitou for three hundred years or more, and the number of mule foal births may have reached 30,000 per year. In the early twentieth century there were about 50,000 Poitevin Mulassier brood mares, which gave birth to some 18,000–20,000 mule foals per year.

The Poitevin mule was well known for its size and strength, and was exported to other parts of France and to many countries, among them Germany, Greece, Italy, Portugal, Spain and Turkey; many travelled further, to the Russian Empire and the United States. With the mechanisation of agriculture after the Second World War, demand for mules rapidly fell to low levels. By the 1990s the Poitevin Mulassier was critically endangered, and mares were mostly put to Mulassier stallions in order to increase breed numbers. Approximately twenty Poitevin mules are born each year. In 2017 there were 195 active Mulassier brood-mares. Of these, about 25% were covered by Baudet jacks; 26 mule foals were born.

The Poitevin mule was recognised by the Haras Nationaux of France in 2002; a mule foal born to a registered and approved Baudet du Poitou jack and a registered Poitevin Mulassier mare is automatically eligible for registration in the stud-book of the Poitevin mule.
