= Oie de Touraine =

French breed of goose

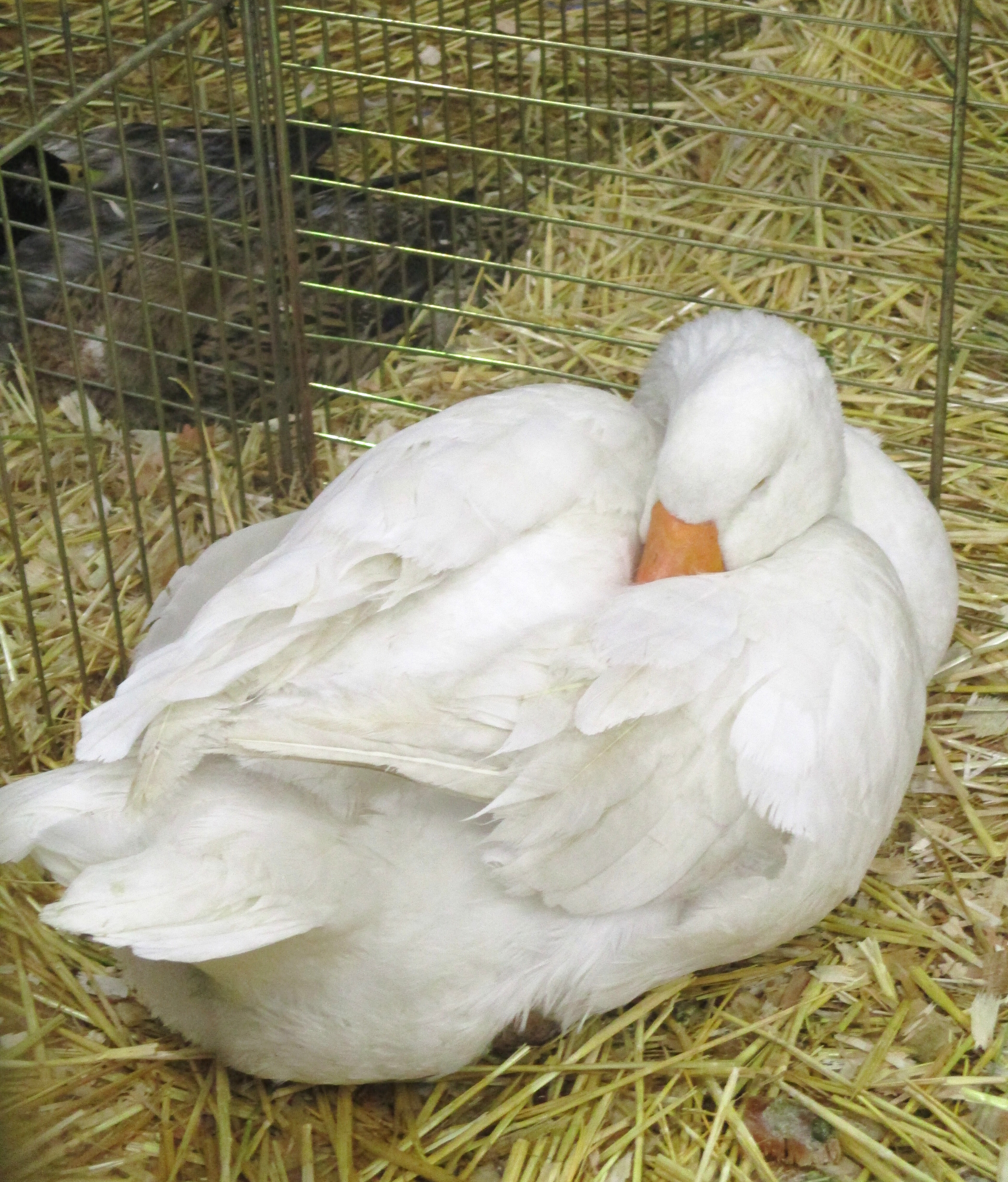
- Goose

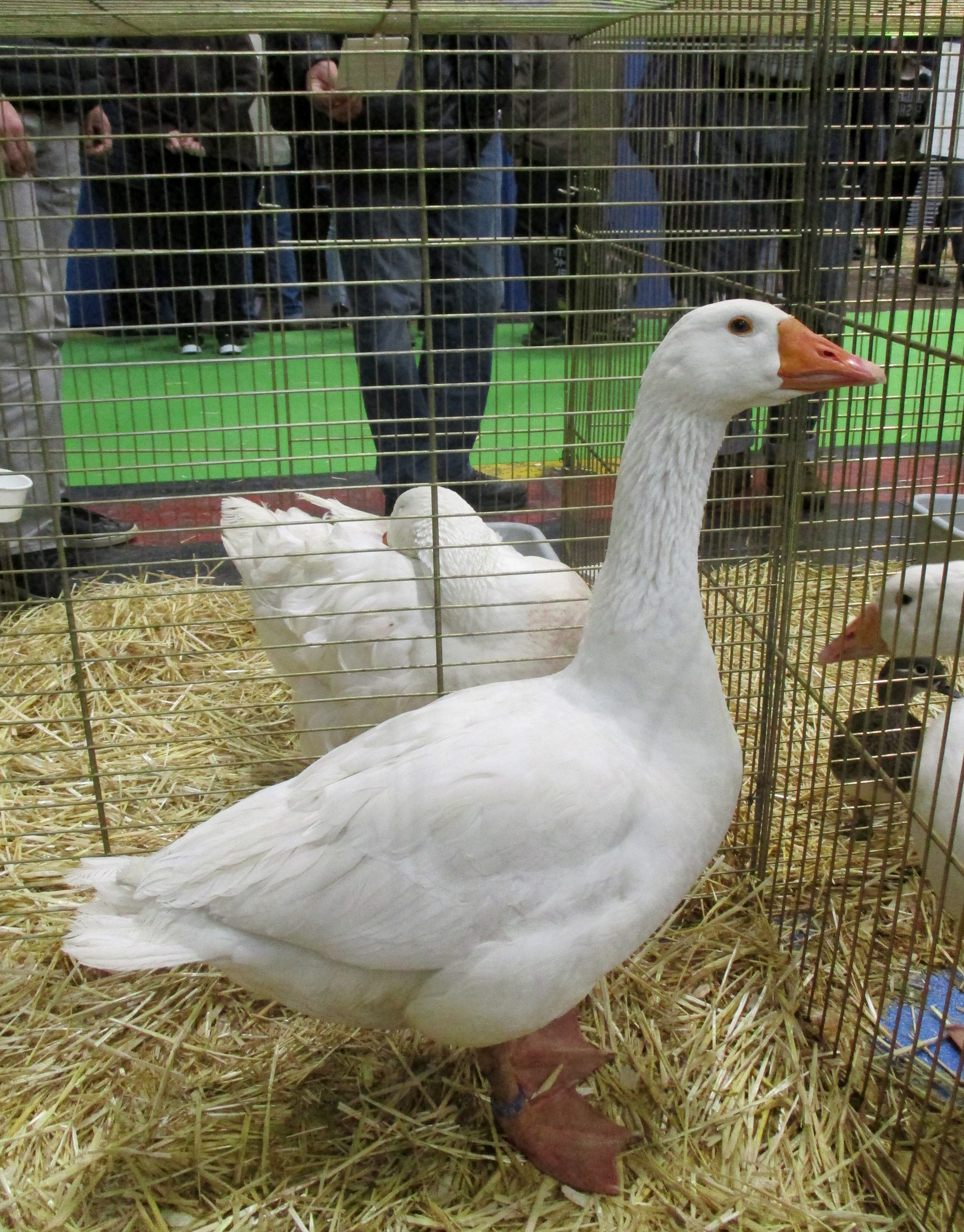
- Gander
- Conservation status: FAO (2007): not listed; DAD-IS (2025): unknown
- Distribution: Touraine
- Use: meat; feathers; down

Traits
- Weight: Male: 6–7 kg; Female: 5–6.5 kg
- Colour: white

Classification
- APA: no
- EE: no
- PCGB: not recognised
- Goose; Anser anser

The Oie de Touraine is a French breed of goose originating in the historical province of Touraine in west-central France. It is always white, and may have common origins with other white regional breeds of west and central France. Like most other domestic geese, it derives from the wild species Anser anser.

== History ==
The Oie de Touraine was bred in the historical province of Touraine – the area surrounding the city of Tours – in west-central France, now mostly in the département of Indre-et-Loire but also partly within those of Indre, Loir-et-Cher and Vienne. It may share its origins with other white regional breeds of west and central France including the Oie Blanche du Poitou of Poitou to the west and the Oie Blanche du Bourbonnais of the Bourbonnais to the east.

By the 1940s there was a breed society – the Club agricole de Touraine – and a regional breed standard. A breed standard was submitted for approval to the national Fédération Française des Volailles in 1998, but was rejected; it was approved in the following year. It is not among the breeds listed by the Entente Européenne d'Aviculture et de Cuniculture.

It was not among the French breeds of goose listed by the Food and Agriculture Organization of the United Nations as part of its report on the The State of the World's Animal Genetic Resources for Food and Agriculture in 2007. No population data has ever been reported to DAD-IS, and in 2026 the conservation status of the breed was unknown.

== Characteristics ==
It is of medium size, with a weight of some 5 to 6.5 kg for geese and 6 to 7 kg for ganders. It is pure white, with orange-yellow bill and legs.

== Use ==
The Oie de Touraine is reared both for its white down and feathers and as a roasting bird. It is fast-growing, hardy and rustic, and is suitable as a farm-yard bird. The eggs weigh about 140 g.
