= Barbezieux (chicken) =

Chicken breed

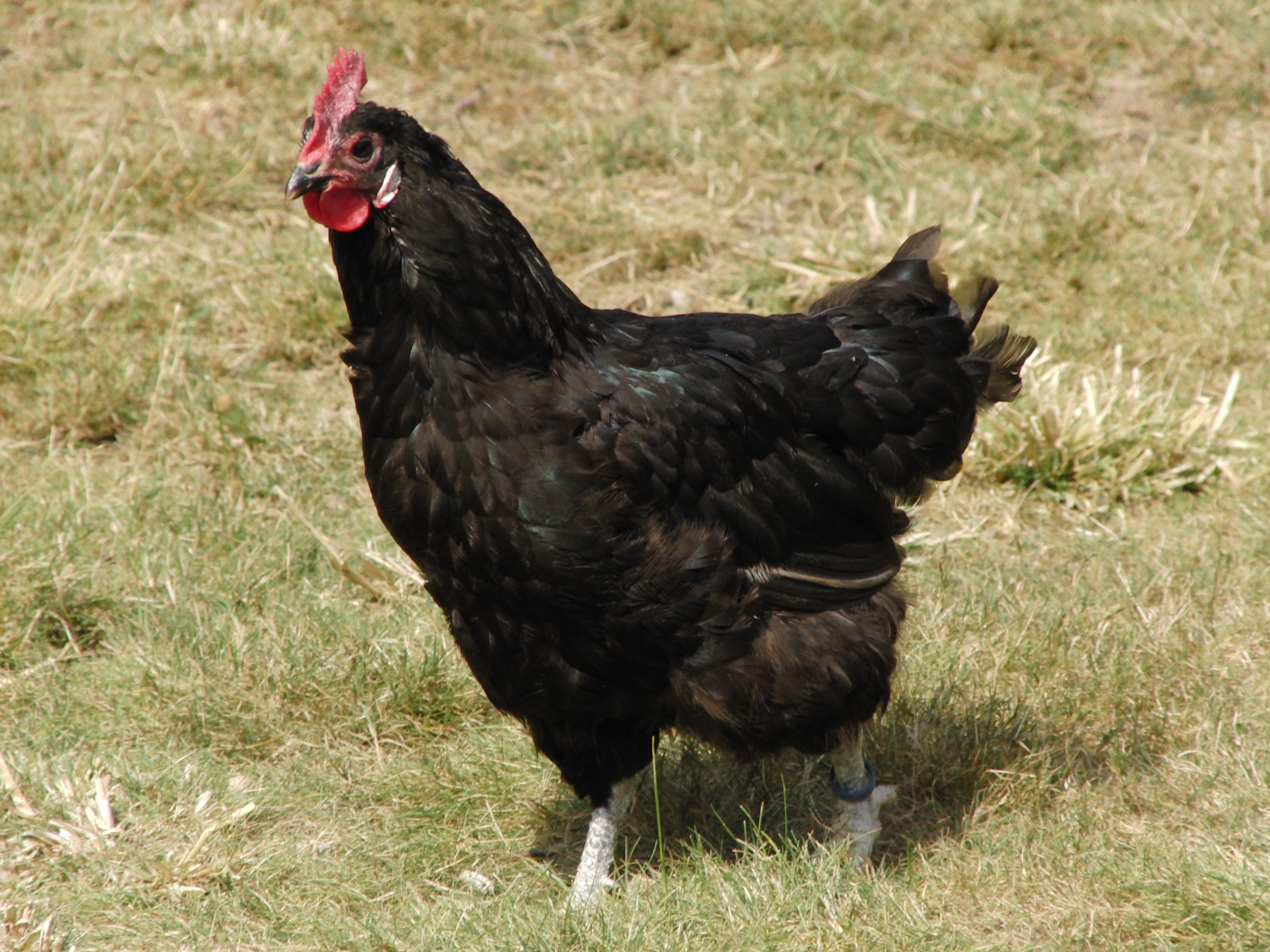
Barbezieux hen

The Barbezieux (French pronunciation: [baʁbəzjø]) is a French breed of chicken. It is one of the tallest chicken breeds native to Europe.

The breed, considered rare, was recreated by four chicken breeders between 1980 and 1985.

Currently chickens conforming to the standard are raised in its region of origin. It should also be noted the recent creation of a production sector for quality chickens with a label marked “Poulet de race Barbezieux, race ancienne”, due to the efforts of ASPOULBA (Association pour la sauvegarde de la poule de Barbezieux). In 2003, ASPOULBA drafted regional specifications bringing together five breeders and defining the criteria for production, feeding, and slaughter in a defined territory.

According to the French newspaper Sud Ouest, the breed has a reputation as having tasty, almost gamey meat. About 10,000 to 12,000 birds are raised per year and slaughtered after a minimum of 110 days.
