= Oie Normande =

French breed of goose

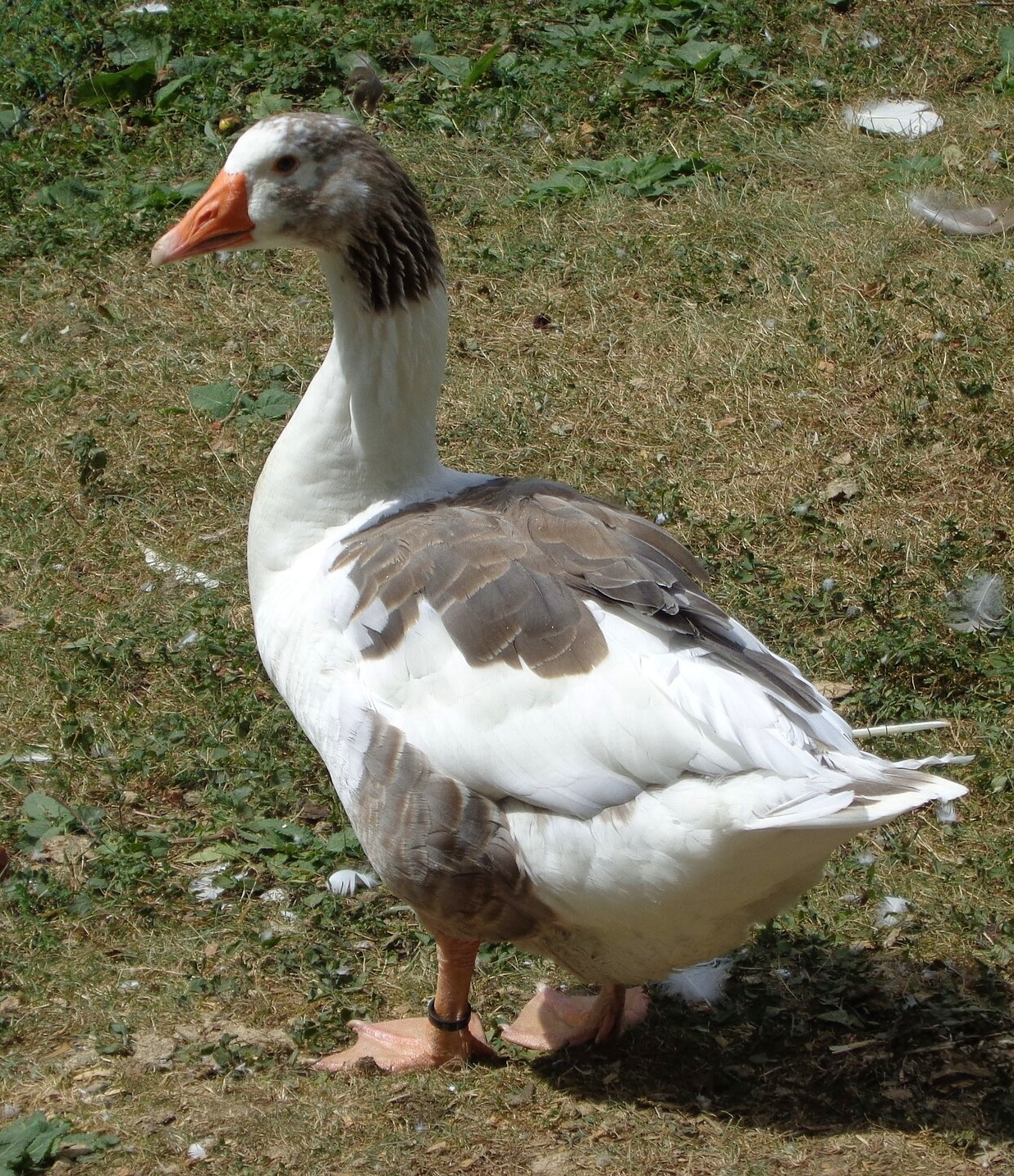
- Goose

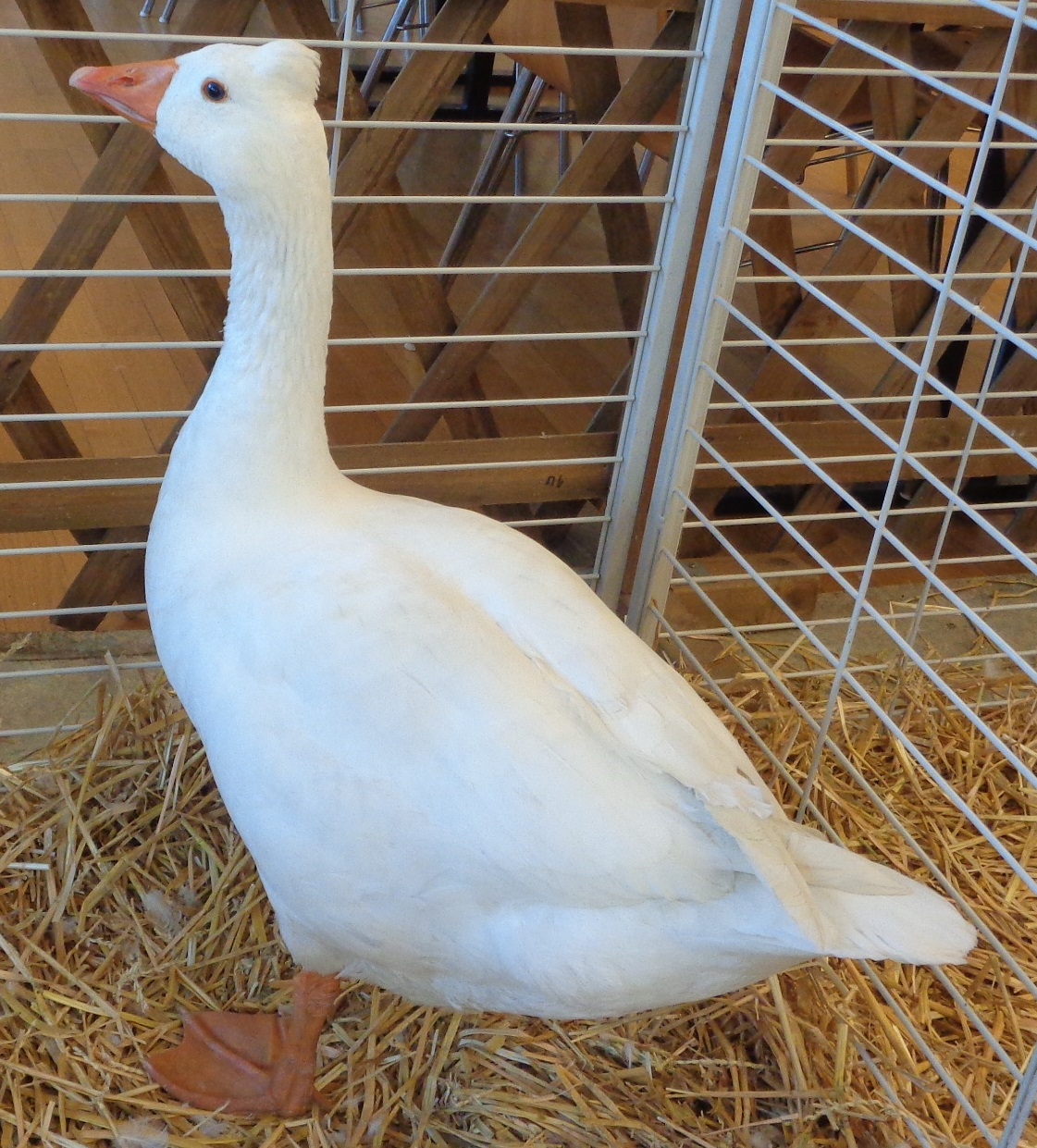
- Gander (crested)
- Conservation status: FAO (2007): endangered; DAD-IS (2025): unknown
- Other names: Oie de Bavent; Oie de type Bavent
- Country of origin: France
- Distribution: Normandy

Classification
- APA: no
- EE: listed, not recognised
- PCGB: not recognised
- Goose; Anser anser

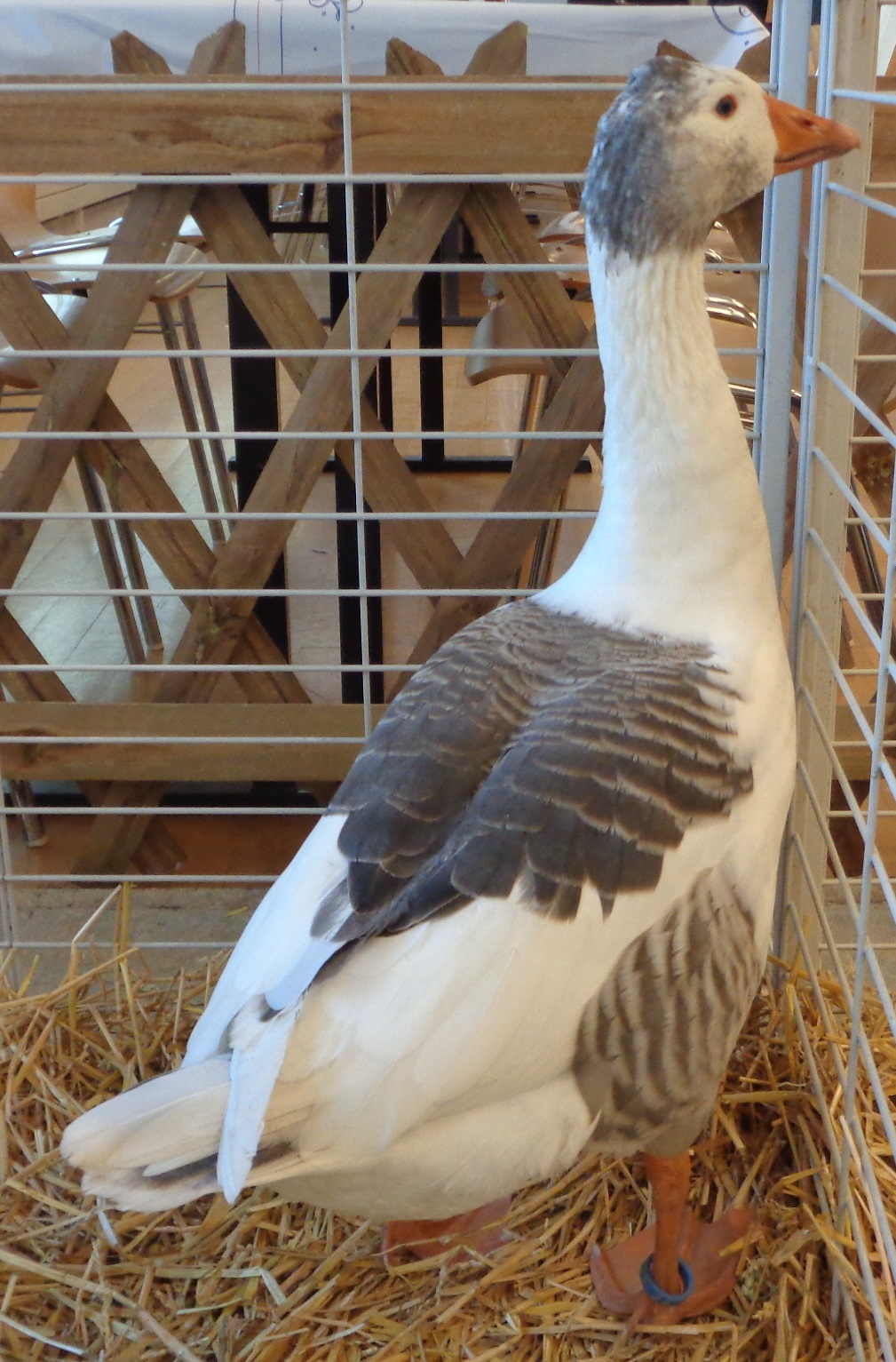
Crested goose (female)

The Oie Normande is a French breed of goose originating in the historical province of Normandy in northern France. It is an auto-sexing breed: ganders are always white, while geese are grey-and-white. Like most other domestic geese, it derives from the wild species Anser anser.

There are two sub-types, with and without a crest. The crested variant may be called the Oie de Bavent; it is gravely endangered – a total of thirty (female) geese were found in a census in 2014.

== History ==
The Normande was bred in the historical province of Normandy in northern France.

It is recognised by the national Fédération Française des Volailles of France, and is listed but not recognised by the Entente Européenne d'Aviculture et de Cuniculture.

Its conservation status was listed by the Food and Agriculture Organization of the United Nations in 2007 as 'endangered', and was listed in DAD-IS in 2026 as 'unknown'. The most recent population data dates from 1994, when the total number was estimated to be between 100 and 1000 birds. The crested variant is particularly endangered: a total of thirty (female) geese were found in a census in 2014.

== Characteristics ==
It is not a large goose: body weights are some 4 to 5 kg for geese and 4.5 to 5.5 kg for ganders. It is an auto-sexing breed – the gander and goose are immediately distinguishable because they are of different colours – and is the only French goose with this characteristic. The gander is pure white, with orange-yellow bill and legs, while the goose is grey with white belly and breast, and often with patches of white elsewhere on the body. The bill is short and strong, the eyes are blue.

The birds may be crested; crested examples are considered a separate sub-type.

== Use ==
The Oie Normande is reared as a roasting bird. It is a rustic breed which forages well and can be left to run free. The eggs weigh about 120 g.
