= Oie du Poitou =

French breed of goose

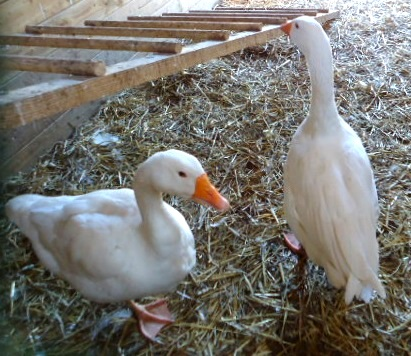
- Conservation status: FAO (2007): endangered; DAD-IS (2026): unknown
- Other names: Blanche du Poitou; Oie Blanche du Poitou
- Country of origin: France
- Distribution: former Poitou

Traits
- Weight: 6–6.5 kg

Classification
- APA: no
- EE: listed, not recognised
- PCGB: not recognised
- Goose; Anser anser

The Oie du Poitou is a French breed of goose originating in the historical province of Poitou in western France. It is always white, with orange bill and shanks, and may have common origins with other white regional breeds of west and central France. Like most other domestic geese, it derives from the wild species Anser anser.

It is one of two goose breeds of Poitou, the other being the Grise du Marais Poitevin, and so may also be known as the Blanche du Poitou or Oie Blanche du Poitou for clearer distinction therefrom.

== History ==
The Oie du Poitou was bred in the historical region and former province of Poitou in western France, which corresponds principally to the modern départements of Deux-Sèvres, the Vendée or Bas-Poitou and the Vienne or Haut-Poitou, together with small parts of those of the Charente, the Charente-Maritime and the Haute-Vienne. It may share its origins with other white regional breeds of west and central France including the Oie de Touraine of the historic Touraine region to the east, and the Oie Blanche du Bourbonnais of the Bourbonnais, still further to the east.

It was formerly reared in large numbers, principally for the production of skins and leather. In 1940 there may have been 300000 of the geese; with the advent of synthetic materials, demand for the skins fell sharply, and by 1961 the total number of the birds had fallen to approximately 12000. No population data has been reported to DAD-IS since 1994, when the total number was estimated to be between 10 and 1000 birds. A census by the Conservatoire des Ressources Génétiques du Centre-Ouest Atlantique found a total of 71 birds of both sexes, while a census by the Institut National de la Recherche Agronomique in 2014 found 89 (female) geese. Its conservation status was listed by the Food and Agriculture Organization of the United Nations in 2007 as 'endangered', and was listed in DAD-IS in 2026 as 'unknown'.

It is recognised by the national Fédération Française des Volailles of France, and is listed but not recognised by the Entente Européenne d'Aviculture et de Cuniculture.

== Characteristics ==
It is of medium or large size: body weights are variously given as 6 to 6.5 kg for both geese and ganders, or as 7 to 7.5 kg for geese and 8 to 9 kg for ganders. It is pure white, with orange or orange-yellow bill and legs; the eyes are blue.

== Use ==
The Oie du Poitou was formerly reared principally for leather and skins (with the down left on them); these were marketed as peaux de cygne or bandes de cygne – meaning 'swan skins' – and were in high demand until synthetic materials became widely available in the second half of the twentieth century. Few of these skins were produced from birds of any other breed in France; feathers, down and meat were also produced.

It is a rustic breed, and in the twenty-first century may be used for vegetation management. The eggs weigh about 160 g.
