= Poitevin horse =

French breed of horse

Poitevin
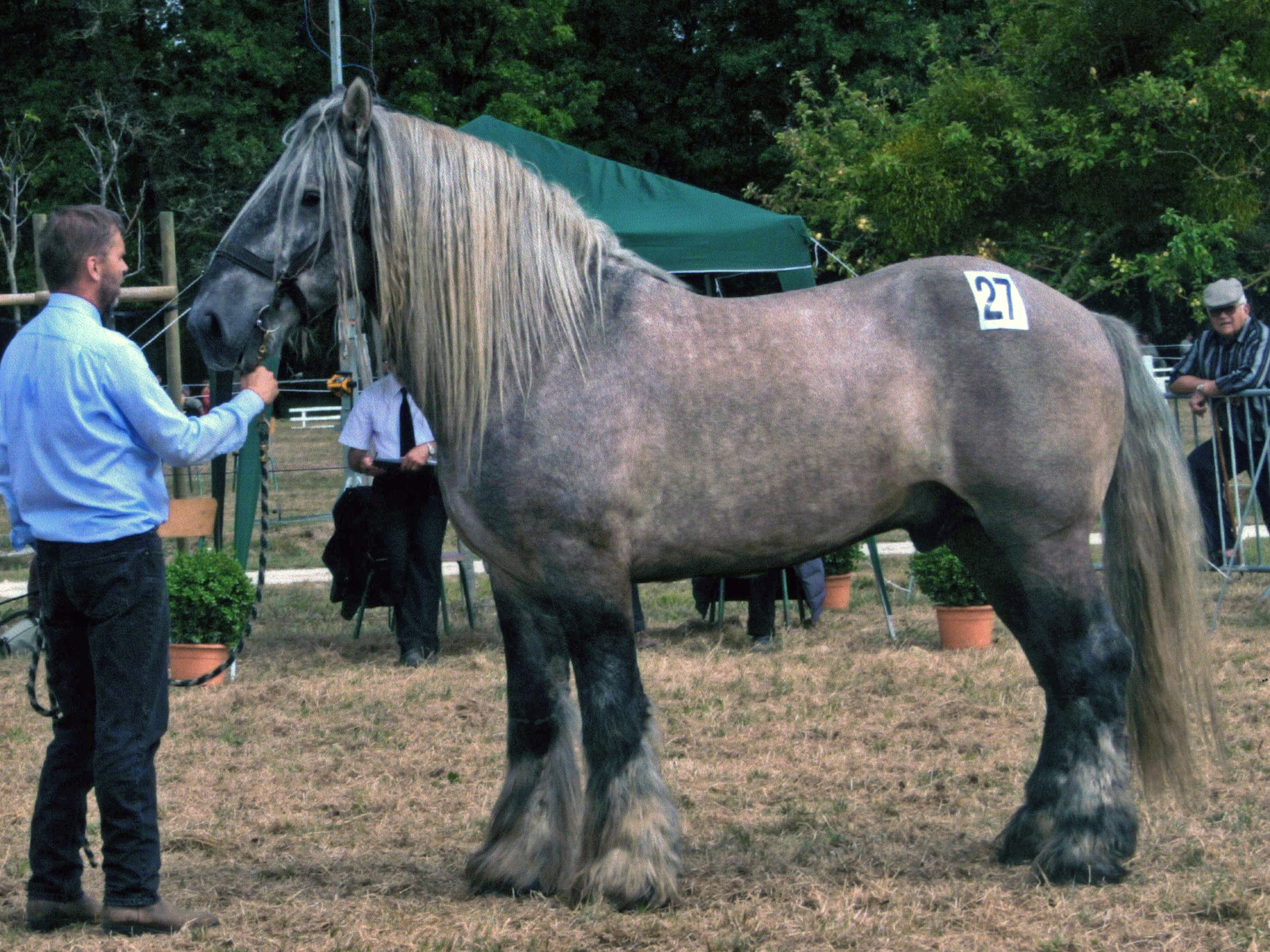

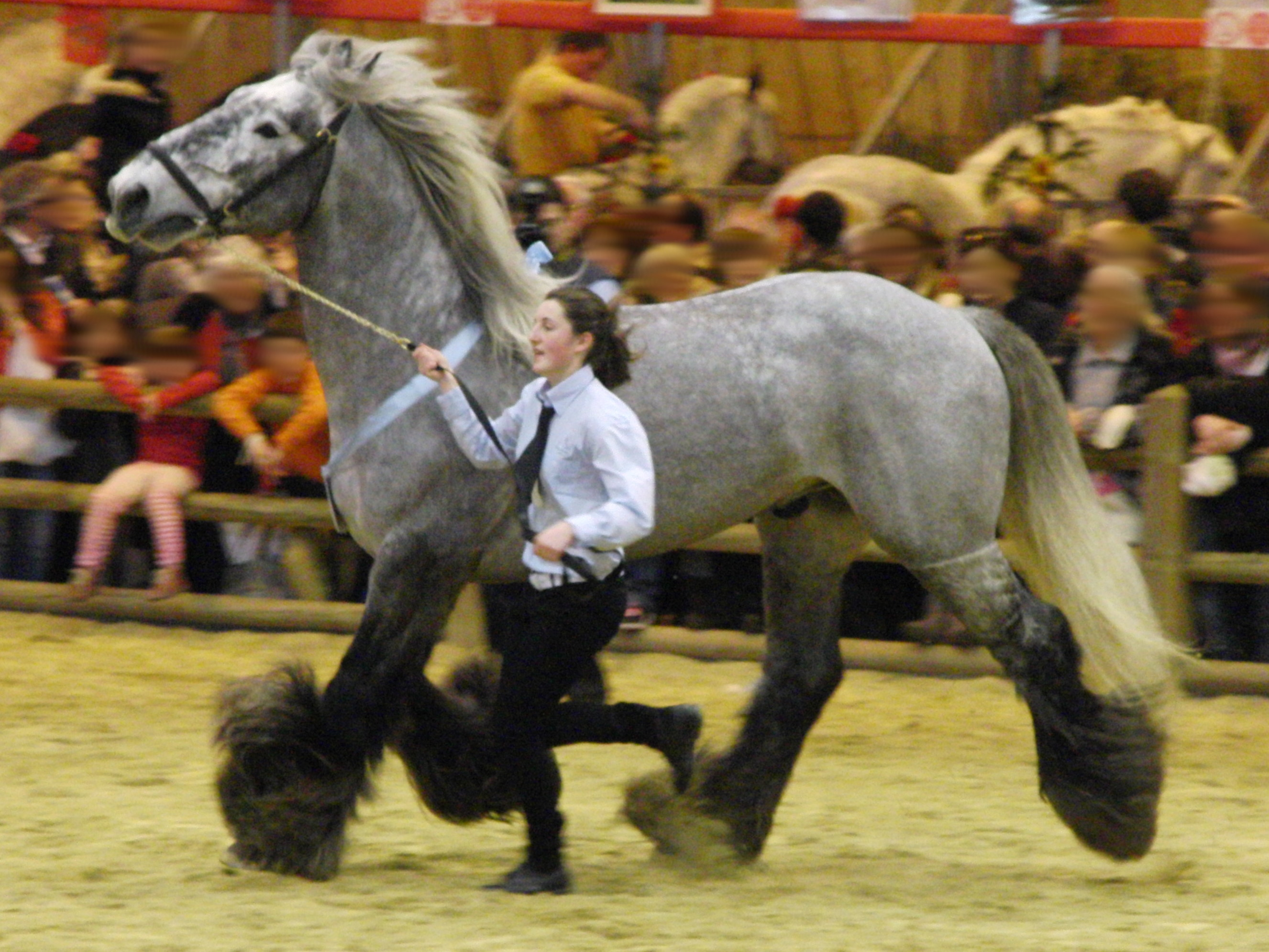
- Conservation status: FAO (2007): endangered-maintained
- Other names: Cheval du Poitou; Mulassier; Trait Mulassier; Poitevin Mulassier; Trait Poitevin Mulassier
- Country of origin: France
- Distribution: Poitou
- Use: breeding mules

Traits
- Weight: 700–900 kg
- Height: 1.53–1.73 m; Male: minimum 1.65 m; Female: minimum 1.60 m
- Colour: any colour but pied

The Poitevin (French pronunciation: [pwat(ə)vɛ̃]) or Poitou is a French breed of draft horse. It is named for its area of origin, the former province of Poitou in west-central France, now a part of the region of Nouvelle-Aquitaine. It was formed in the seventeenth century when horses of Flemish or Dutch origin, brought to the area by engineers working to drain the Marais Poitevin, interbred with local horses. Although it has the size and conformation of a draft horse, the Poitevin has never been bred for draft abilities, and has been little used for draft work. Its principal traditional use was the production of mules. Poitevin mares were put to jacks of the large Baudet du Poitou breed of donkey; the resulting Poitevin mules were in demand for agricultural and other work in many parts of the world, including Russia and the United States. In the early twentieth century there were some 50,000 brood mares producing between 18,000 and 20,000 mules per year.

The Poitevin is an endangered breed; in 2011 there were just over 300 breeding animals, of which about 40 were stallions. The horses may be of any solid coat color, including striped dun, a color not seen in other French draft horses. The Poitevin is a slow-growing breed with heavy bone, and is not suitable for meat production.

== History ==
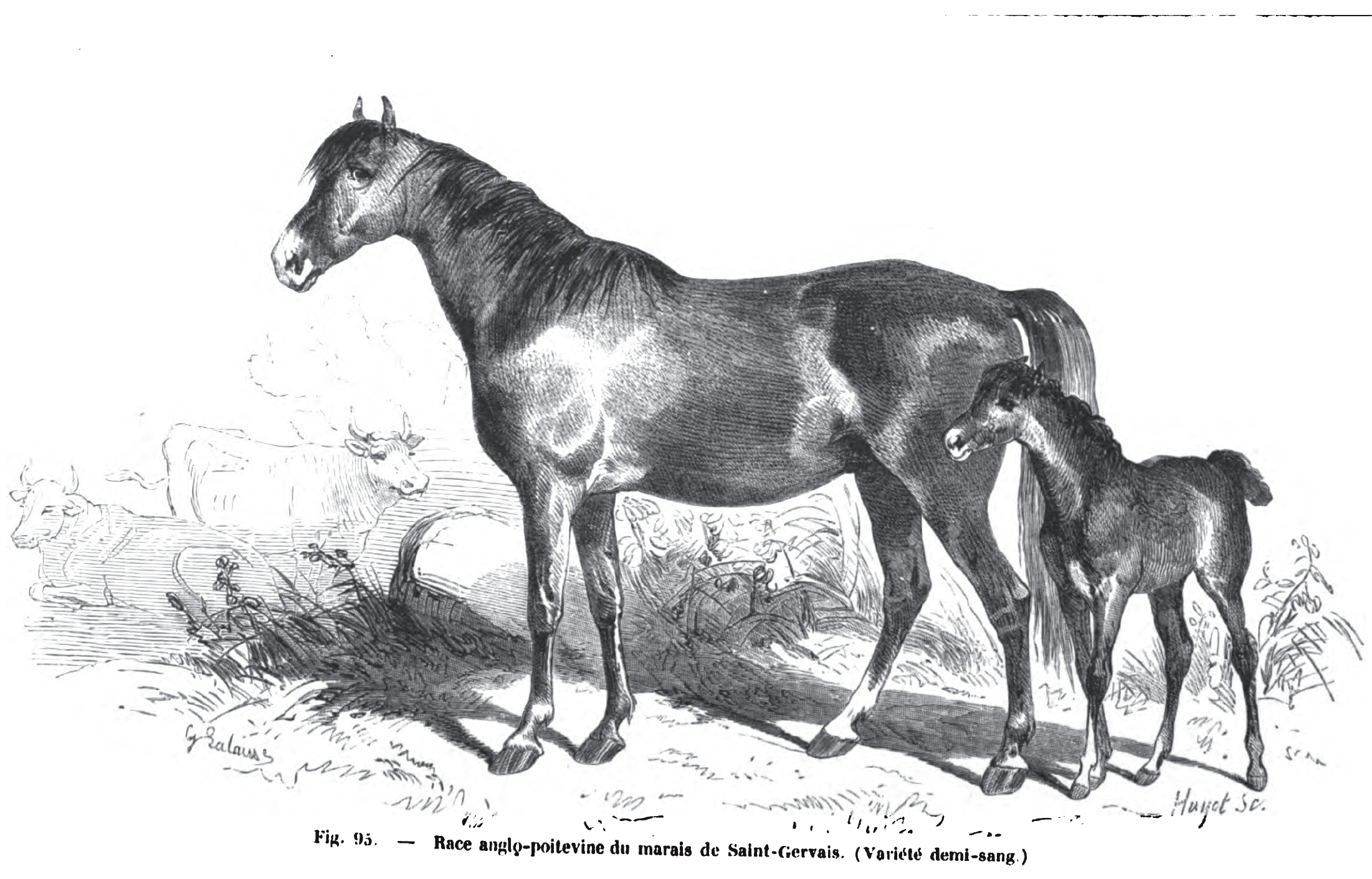
An 1861 illustration of an Anglo-Poitevin

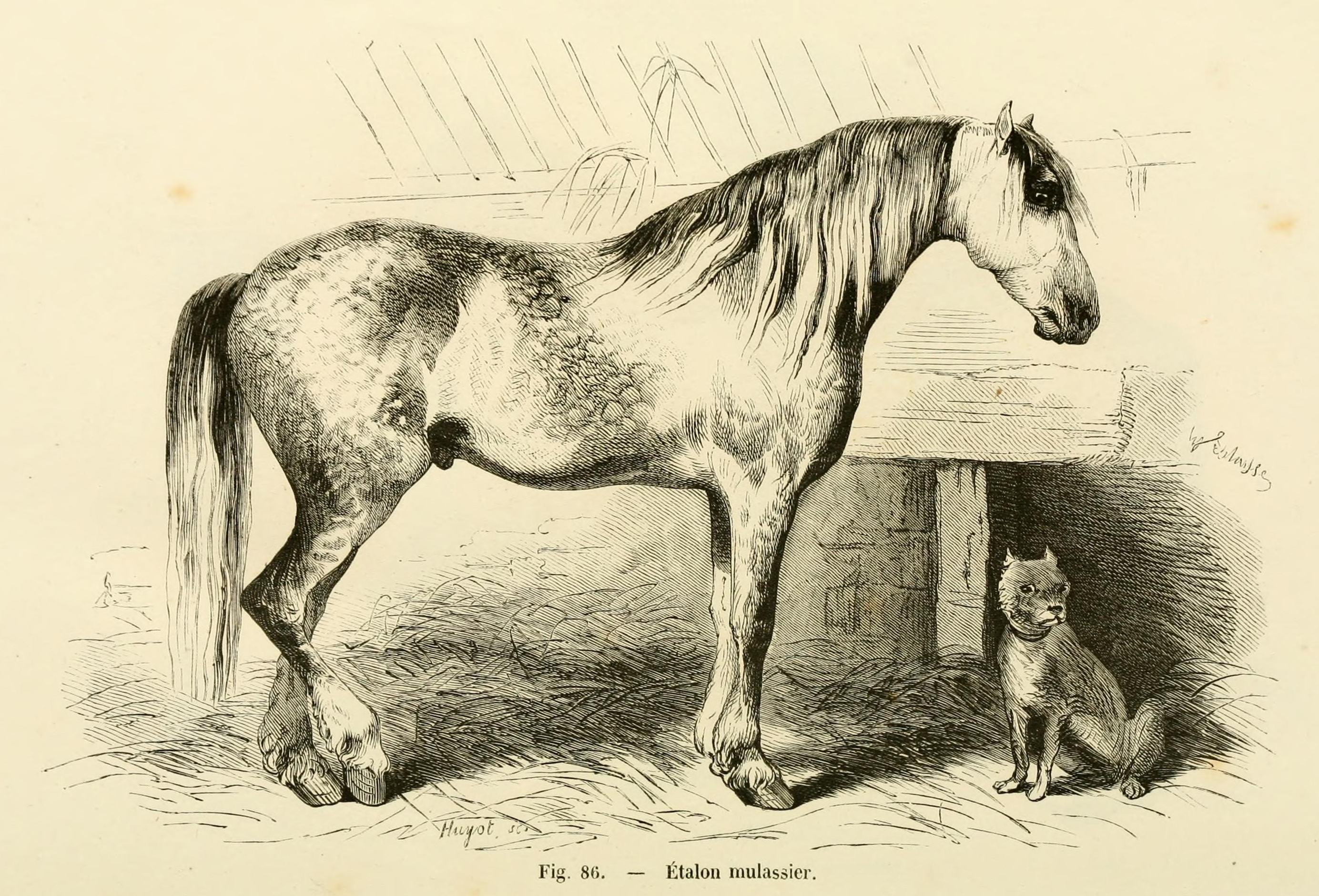
Stallion in an engraving of 1877

The Poitevin originated in the marshlands of the Charente and the Vendée in the seventeenth century, when horses of Flemish or Dutch origin, brought to the area by engineers working on land drainage, interbred with local horses.

On 1 January 1599, Henri IV of France appointed Humphrey Bradley, an English land drainage engineer from Brabant, maître des digues du royaume, or "master of dykes of the Kingdom", which essentially gave him a monopoly of all dyking and land reclamation work throughout the country. Bradley also enjoyed the support of Maximilien de Béthune, Duke of Sully, chief minister to the king. Early in the seventeenth century he contracted to drain parts of the Marais de Saintonge, but was not able to carry the work forward until after 1607, when the Société générale de desséchement des marais et lacs de France was formed by royal edict. He did not himself direct the work, but entrusted it to two brothers, Marc and Jérome de Comans. They brought a good number of workers from the Low Countries; by about 1610 the area between Muron and Tonnay-Charente had come to be known as the Marais de la Petite-Flandre, the "marsh of little Flanders". It is believed that a number of working horses were also brought from the Low Countries, possibly of Brabant, Flemish or Friesian type. Drainage of the Marais Poitevin, the marshlands of Poitou, did not begin before 1640, by which time Bradley is thought to have died. Horses were brought to the area from Germany in about 1685. Interbreeding between these various imported horses and local stock of indeterminate type led to the development of the Poitevin, a large, heavy, slow horse well adapted to marshy terrain.

At the end of the eighteenth century, the French government tried to impose a system of crossing Poitevin horses with lighter-weight Norman and Thoroughbred horses to create cavalry horses. Despite financial incentives, private breeders protested because they felt that the resulting crossbred horses created poor quality mules upon further breeding. The changes also affected the characteristics of the breed that had been developed for work in its marshy homeland, including large hooves and a calm manner. Some sources argue that at this point the breed was employed for agricultural and logging uses. Others state that they were not pulling horses, and were instead used almost solely for the production of mules.

=== Production of mules ===
Poitevin mares were crossbred with Poitou donkeys to create the famous Poitou mule, a large, hardy breed. Like most animal hybrids, mules are sterile and can only be created through crossing a donkey and a horse. The industry of mule breeding in Poitou has existed since at least the eighteenth century, when it was opposed by the government stud farm administration that was attempting to breed cavalry horses for French troops. At the beginning of the nineteenth century, the government prohibited breeding mules from mares taller than 120 cm (11.3 h), and threatened to castrate all donkeys in the region. In the 1860s Eugene Gayot noted that the heavy mares from the Poitou marshes produced the best mules, probably because of their heavy bone structure.

Although the Poitevin was not the only breed of horse used for the production of mules, the Poitou mule was known worldwide. They were in high demand in the United States from the late nineteenth century until the beginning of World War I. During the 1920s, livestock production began to decline. In the Deux-Sèvres region, especially in the district of Melle, near Luçon and Saint-Maixent, mule breeding began to be concentrated in ateliers (workshops), which were relatively expensive for breeders.

=== Nineteenth century ===
Poitevin colts and fillies were sold at fairs in Marans, Nuaillé, Surgères, Rochefort, Pont-l'Abbé and Saujon. In 1867, there were 50,000 pure and crossbred mares. By the early twentieth century, there were tens of thousands of Poitevins in France, but numbers later fell. Poitevin colts, which were not used for the breeding of mules, were considered "soft" and less valuable than the major draft horse breed of the nineteenth century – the Percheron. Some horse dealers purchased young gray Poitevin horses, fed them heavily to make them larger and stronger, and then sold them at the age of four as Percherons. These "Percherons" were transported to areas such as Saintonge, Yonne, Nivernais and Gâtinais.

In the nineteenth century the Poitevin received some intromission of other blood: early in the century, a few Percheron stallions were introduced to the breeding area; between 1860 and 1867, about ten Bourbourienne stallions were used; in the middle years of the century, more substantial use was made of Breton stallions, a practice supported by some breeders and criticised by others. The Breton influence tended to make the head more square and the ears shorter; the Poitevin lost weight without gaining anything else, the legs became too long and too thin, and gray became more common as a coat color. In 1860, Eugene Gayot called the mares of the breed "heavy, common, soft and of medium size". Breeders chose horses with large joints, thick coats and a high croup, and had a preference for a black coat color.

In 1861, there were concerns that the old-style Poitevin was becoming extinct, and questions about whether the Poitou mule retained the quality that it previously had. The large Poitevin mares became rarer, due to large amounts of crossbreeding and a lack of care shown towards breeding stock selection. Thoroughbreds and Thoroughbred crosses, especially at the stud farms in Saint-Maixent and La Roche-sur-Yon, created the Anglo-Poitevin type, a half-blood used by the army. The continued draining of the marshes also influenced the breed. Many Poitevins at this point were actually a mix of Breton and old-type Poitevin bloodstock. However, a distinction persisted between the real Poitevin and mixed-blood horses, and farmers who preferred the former preserved the type, which formed the base for the creation of the breed studbook.

The studbook for the Poitevin horse was created by the Société Centrale d'Agriculture des Deux-Sèvres on June 26, 1884, with a horse section and a donkey section. The first edition was released December 31, 1885, setting the physical criteria for breeding, and ending the practice of promoting crossbred horses as purebreds. It also marked the end of government intervention against the mule breeding industry, although bonuses were paid to encourage farmers to breed purebred horses. In 1902, a breeding syndicate to promote Poitou mules was created, but disappeared after a lack of advertising by stock breeders. On August 6, 1912, the French government released a decree officially supporting the mule breeding industry, backed by the purchase of mules by the Haras Nationaux and bonuses given to the best stallions.

=== Twentieth century ===
After several revisions, the studbook was closed in 1922 after registering 424 foundation horses. The closing of the studbook brought about additional purebred breeding and selection based on conformation, color and working ability. In 1923, an association of Poitevin breeders was founded, but declining livestock production pushed the group to reorganize in 1937 in order to gain more support from the government, through bonuses and subsidies.

In the first half of the twentieth century, the mule breeding industry collapsed with the advent of mechanization. By 1922, Poitevin foals became difficult to sell, and the population dropped dramatically as there was no economic incentive for breeding. A continued breeding of mules caused the breed to decline faster than other draft breeds, as purebred horses were not bred as often. By 1945, breed selection was oriented towards the production of meat, as the only remaining economic opportunity for farmers. The conformation of the breed changed slightly to become shorter, but the Poitevin remained unprofitable for horse meat, as breeders preferred to invest in herds of Comtois and Breton horses, which were faster growing and higher yielding.

By 1950, there were only about 600 mares and 50 stallions left. Increasing mechanization and competition with other livestock hurt the Poitevin, as did a lack of promotion and protection. Between 1970 and 1990, the population of the Poitevin varied between 250 and 300 animals, with an average of 20 new horses entering the studbook each year. By the early 1990s, population numbers fell to the lowest in history. Sources are unclear on the number of living Poitevins in the early 1990s, but by 1996 one author says there were 64 newly registered foals and 28 approved breeding stallions, while another gives a total population of 293 horses in 1997.

=== Conservation and genetic testing ===
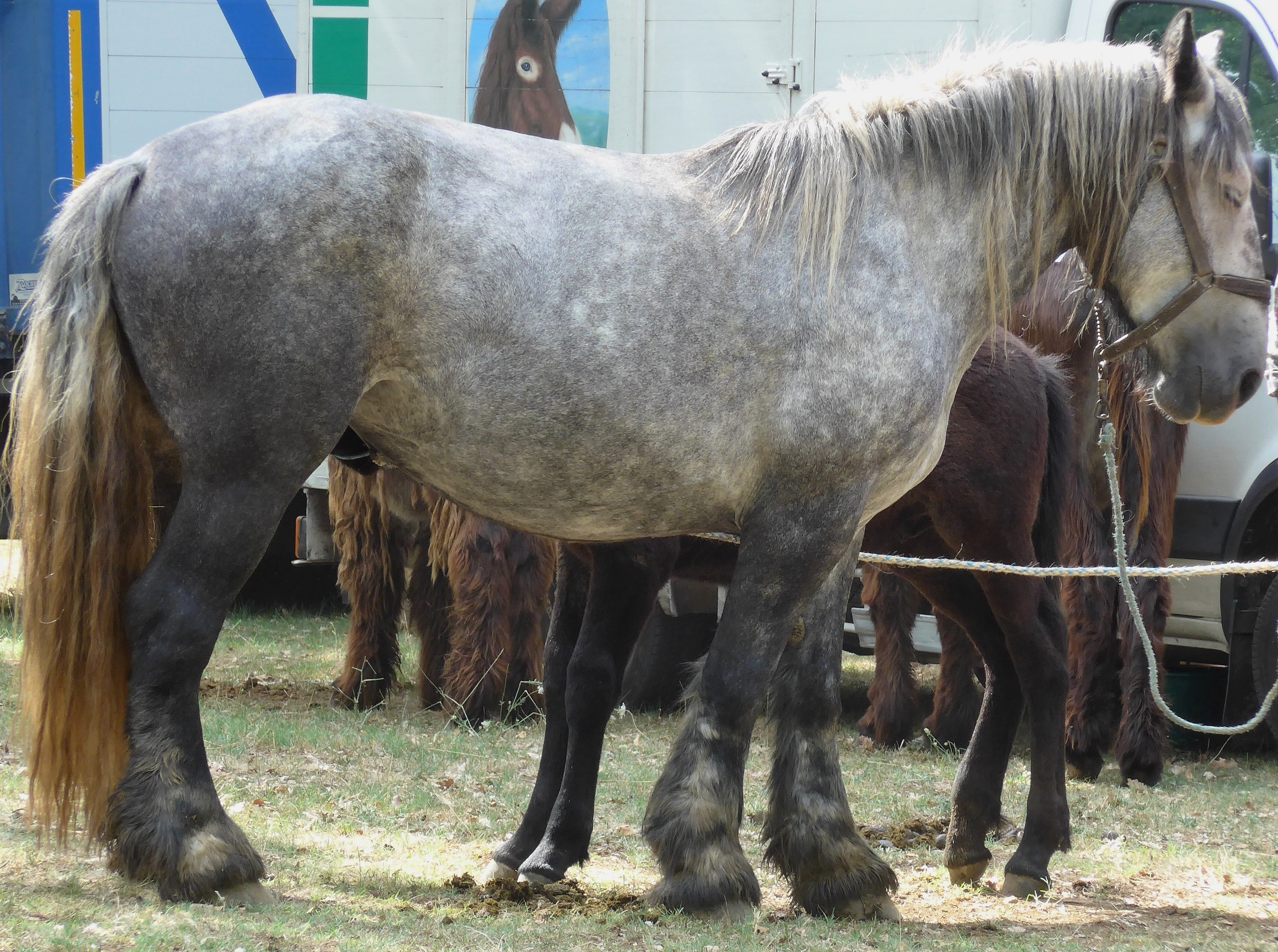
Mare in the Ardèche, 2017

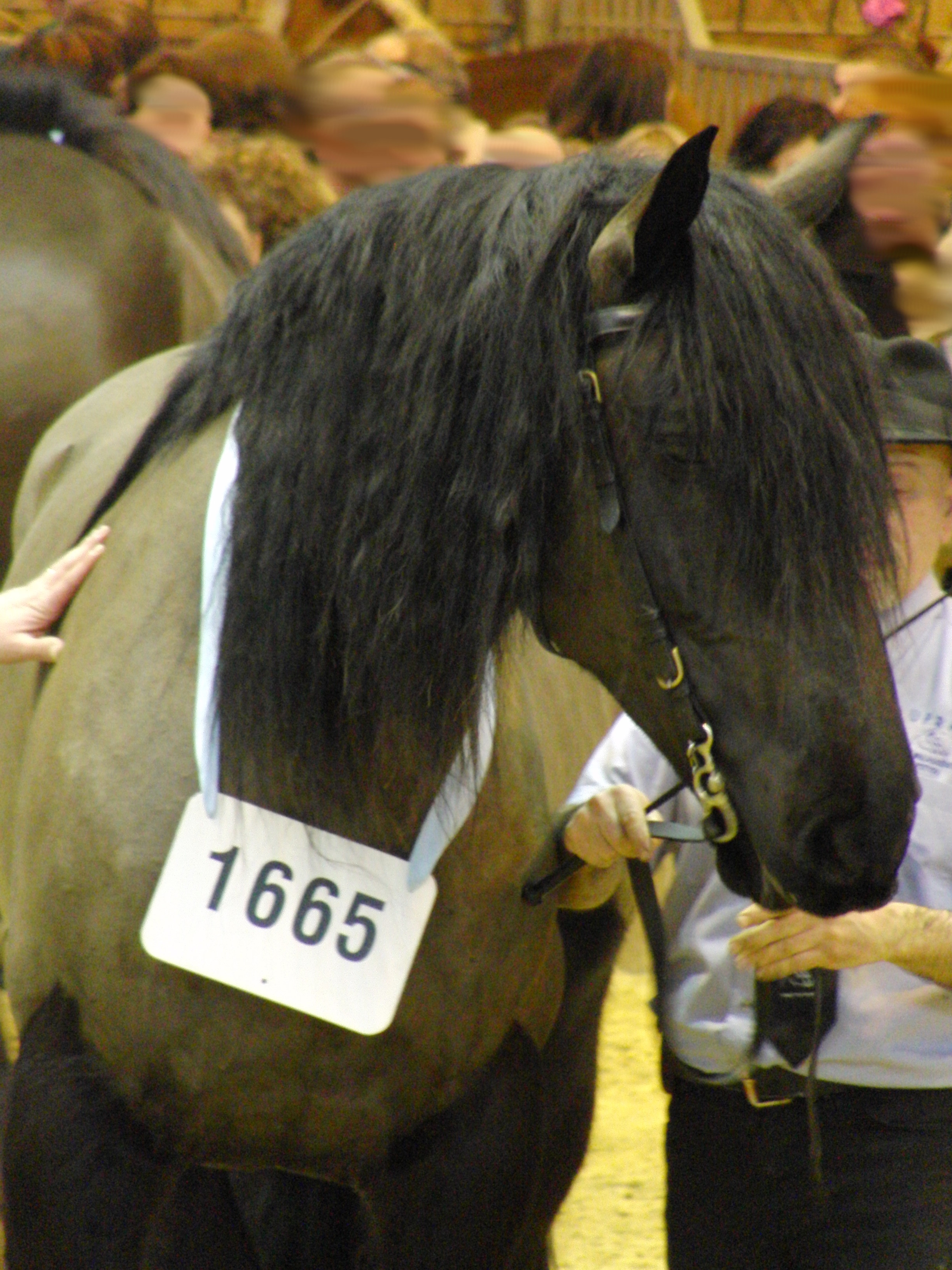
Head and forequarters

The breed owes its survival to a small group of enthusiasts, working with the French National Stud. A genetic study performed in 1994 revealed a genetic bottleneck in the mid-1900s, with the entire modern population of Poitevins tracing to one stallion, named Québec, foaled in 1960. There is a significant risk of inbreeding, leading the Unité Nationale de Sélection et de Promotion de Race to promote a plan of managed breeding in 1998. At the same time, crossbreeding with Friesian and Belgian horses was suggested to increase genetic diversity using morphologically and historically similar breeds. The French government distributes bonuses to the owners of the best stallions, a program more important to the Poitevin than to other draft breeds because of the significant possibility of extinction.

The Poitevin had a slight increase in numbers at the beginning of the twenty-first century, and could count approximately 100 farms perpetuating the breed. The association had around 300 members, as well as 83 stallions and 189 mares registered. In 2006 it was still considered the most endangered French horse breed, with fewer than 100 births per year and a slightly decreasing population. There is little crossbreeding with other breeds. In 2008, a second genetic study was conducted in partnership with the Institut national de la recherche agronomique; this study considered the Poitevin and four other French breeds to be endangered. It suggested making these breeds a conservation priority in order to maintain maximum genetic diversity among the French horse population.

The studbook for the Poitevin is based in Niort, and the breed is the subject of a conservation breeding plan, the goal of which is to eventually revive the production of Poitevin mules. The conservation plan includes an experimental infusion of blood from the Boulonnais, and is followed by 70 percent of breeders. A breeders' association, the Association nationale des races mulassières du Poitou, is authorised by the French ministry of agriculture to manage the joint studbook for the Poitevin horse, the Baudet du Poitou and the Poitevin mule. There is an annual breed show in Poitou.

Breed numbers are low. In 2011, there were 71 new foals registered with the studbook. The same year, 227 mares were covered, 171 of them by Poitevin stallions. There were 33 stallions registered and 80 active breeders. These numbers represent a decrease from the previous year. Over the past decade, the highest number of foals registered was 113 in 2008, and between 80 and 90 foals were registered in the other years. The majority of breeding farms are located in the Poitou area, including Vendée (especially around Fontenay-le-Comte and Luçon), Deux-Sèvres (especially near Melle), Vienna and Civray, and some in Charente, near Ruffec. There are National Studs located in Saintes and Vendée. There are a few breeders in Maine-et-Loire.

The Poitevin can be seen at the Asinerie nationale de la Tillauderie, an experimental farm in Dampierre-sur-Boutonne in Charente-Maritime, and at the Haras national de Saintes. It is shown at the annual Paris International Agricultural Show. Approximately a dozen horses are exported each year, mainly to Germany, Sweden and Switzerland. Some stallions have been exported; there is a breeder in Sweden, and another in the United States.

== Characteristics ==
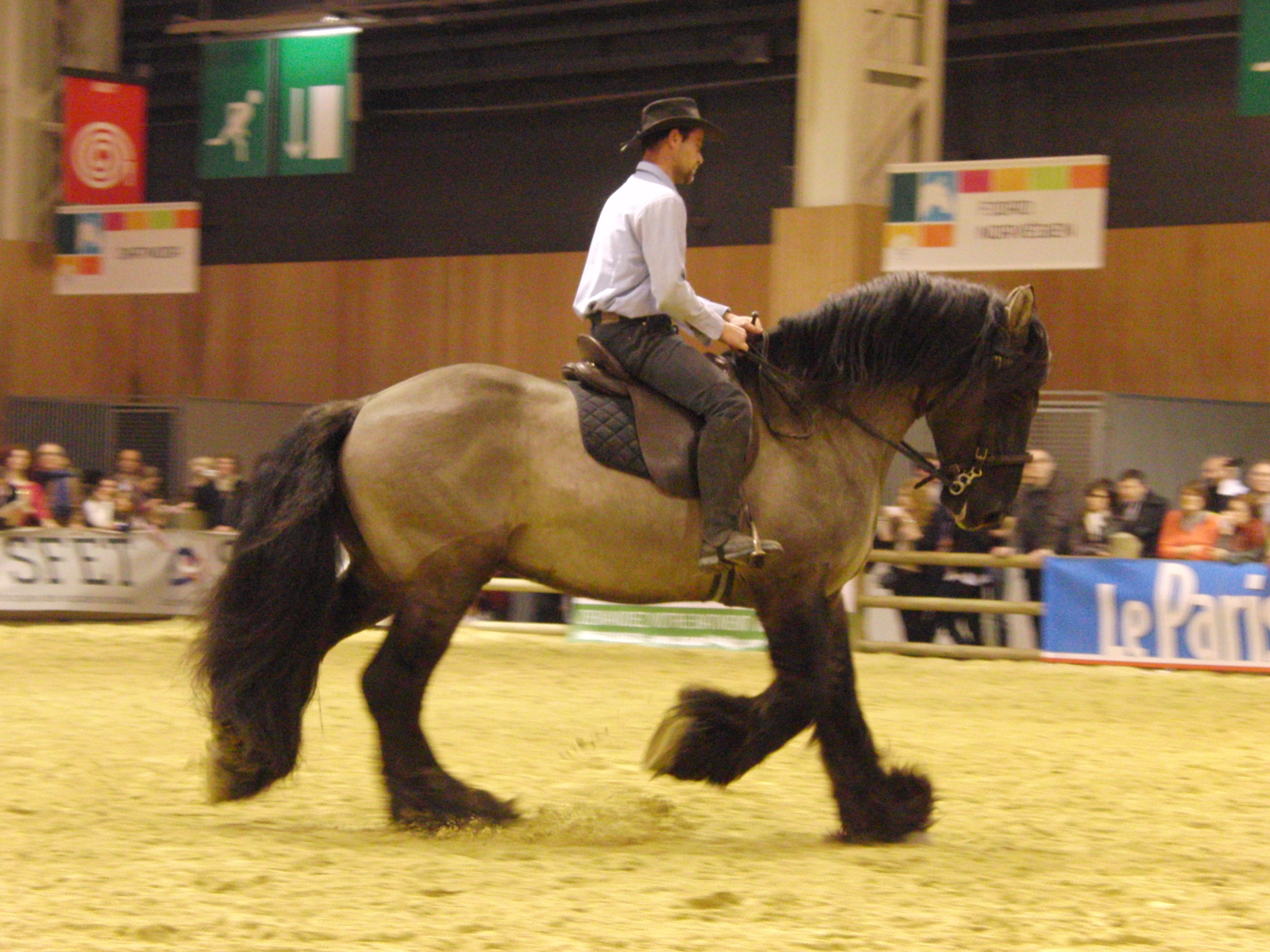
Under saddle

The Poitevin stands about 165 cm (16.1 hands) at the withers; minimum height for at five years old is 165 cm (16.1 h) for males and 160 cm (15.3 h) for mares. It is slow-growing, reaching maturity at six or seven years old.

The body is longer and less heavy than in some other French draft breeds. The head is long and strong, with a convex profile and thick, long ears. The neck is long and the shoulders are sloping. The chest is broad and deep, the withers prominent, the back long and broad, and the hindquarters strong. The legs are well developed and powerful, with large joints. The Poitevin has large hooves, an advantage in wet environments, as an adaptation to the alternately hard and waterlogged marshes upon which it developed. The lower legs are well feathered, and the mane and tail are long and thick. The Poitevin is gentle, calm and robust. Historically the breed has been known for its slow movement and disinterest in pulling, although it can produce significant power if necessary. The breed enjoys human contact, and shows intelligence, although it can also be stubborn. Prolonged effort is its weak point, as the Poitevin sometimes lack endurance.

The Poitevin may be any solid color, with minimum of white markings; pied horses cannot be registered. The wide range of coat colors may be partly the result of the many breeds that influenced it: black and seal brown (French: noir pangaré) may derive from Flemish and Friesian horses, bay roan was probably inherited from the Brabant breed, while chestnut and chestnut roan may result from the Breton influence; gray and bay are also common. Unusually, the Poitevin may also be striped dun, tan-colored with black mane and tail and primitive markings; this may derive from Spanish horses in the ancestry of the Flemish horses brought to Poitou in the seventeenth century. No other French draft horse displays this color.

== Uses ==
Although the Poitevin has the size and conformation of a draft horse, it has never been bred for draft abilities, and has been little used for draft work. From the seventeenth century until about the time of the First World War, its principal use was the production of mules. Poitevin mares were put to jacks of the large Baudet du Poitou breed of donkey. The resulting Poitevin mules were highly regarded, and from the latter part of the nineteenth century were in demand for agricultural and other work in many parts of the world, including Russia and the United States. In the early twentieth century there were some 50,000 brood mares producing between 18,000 and 20,000 mules per year.

As colts had no role in mule production, many were sold as two-year-olds, sometimes at the summer fair in the Vendée and the winter fair in Saint-Maixent, or to horse merchants in Berry, Beauce, the Perche and the Midi; in these areas, they were used for agriculture. In Paris, they were used for pulling omnibuses, while the French military used them for pulling artillery.

In the twenty-first century there is still demand for Poitevin mules, but under the recovery plan for the breed, preference is given to mating mares with Poitevin stallions until numbers have recovered.

The Poitevin may be ridden, or driven in harness, both in competition and for pleasure; it is suitable for equine therapy. It has occasionally been used for light agricultural work in vineyards, in movies, as a mount for forest monitors (in Melun), harnessed for urban work (in Poitier and Niort), and for the collection of waste (on the Île de Ré). It may be used for vegetation management: in 1994 the departmental council of Ille-et-Vilaine bought a herd for maintenance of marshlands in the area.

== See also ==
- List of French horse breeds
