= Andalusian donkey =

Breed of donkey

Andalusian
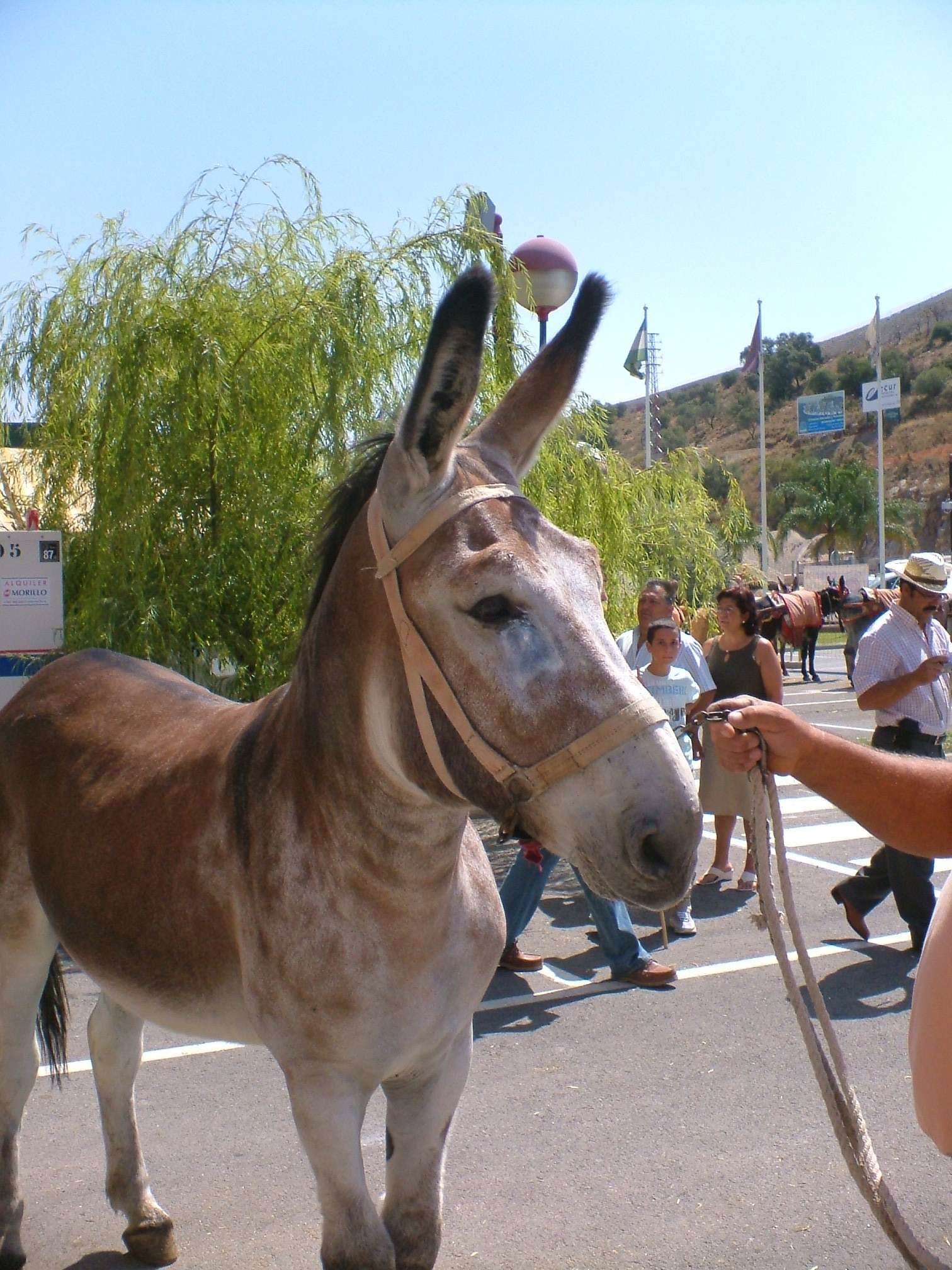
- Conservation status: FAO (2007): critical-maintained
- Other names: Asno Andaluz; Asno Cordobés; Asno de Lucena
- Country of origin: Spain
- Distribution: Andalucia
- Standard: Ministerio de Agricultura, Alimentación y Medio Ambiente (in Spanish)
- Use: transport; siring mules

Traits
- Height: Male: 160 cm; Female: 150 cm

The Andalusian, Spanish: Asno Andaluz, is a Spanish breed of domestic donkey. It is native to the province of Córdoba in Andalusia, and may also be known as the Asno Cordobés after the city of Córdoba or the Asno de Lucena because of its supposed origin in the town of Lucena, Córdoba. It is an endangered breed, and is classified by the Ministerio de Agricultura, Pesca y Alimentación, the Spanish agriculture ministry, as an "autochthonous breed in danger of extinction".

== History ==
The breed contributed to Spain's position as leader in the donkey-breeding industry in the late eighteenth and nineteenth centuries. It is believed to have descended from the giant Egyptian Pharaoh donkey. The breed was considered the most prized in the eighteenth century, and the Spanish crown would not permit them to leave the country; however, King Charles III sent two males (jacks) to U.S. President George Washington in 1785. Only one jack survived the sea journey to Mount Vernon, and was named "Royal Gift".

Its conservation status is critical. At the end of 2013 the total population was reported at 749, of which almost all were in Andalucia.

== Characteristics ==
The Andalusian is a large donkey, standing some 150–160 centimetres (59–63 in) at the withers, and of medium length. The head is of medium size, with a convex profile; the neck is muscular. The coat is short and fine, and soft to the touch; it is pale grey, sometimes almost white. The Andalusian is strong and sturdy, yet docile and calm. It is well adapted to the hot and arid conditions of its native environment.

In 2018, the population of Andalusian donkeys had risen to 839 animals, but only 14 were confirmed as purebred females. This highlights the ongoing concern regarding the genetic purity and small population size of the breed.
