= Baudet du Poitou =

French breed of donkey

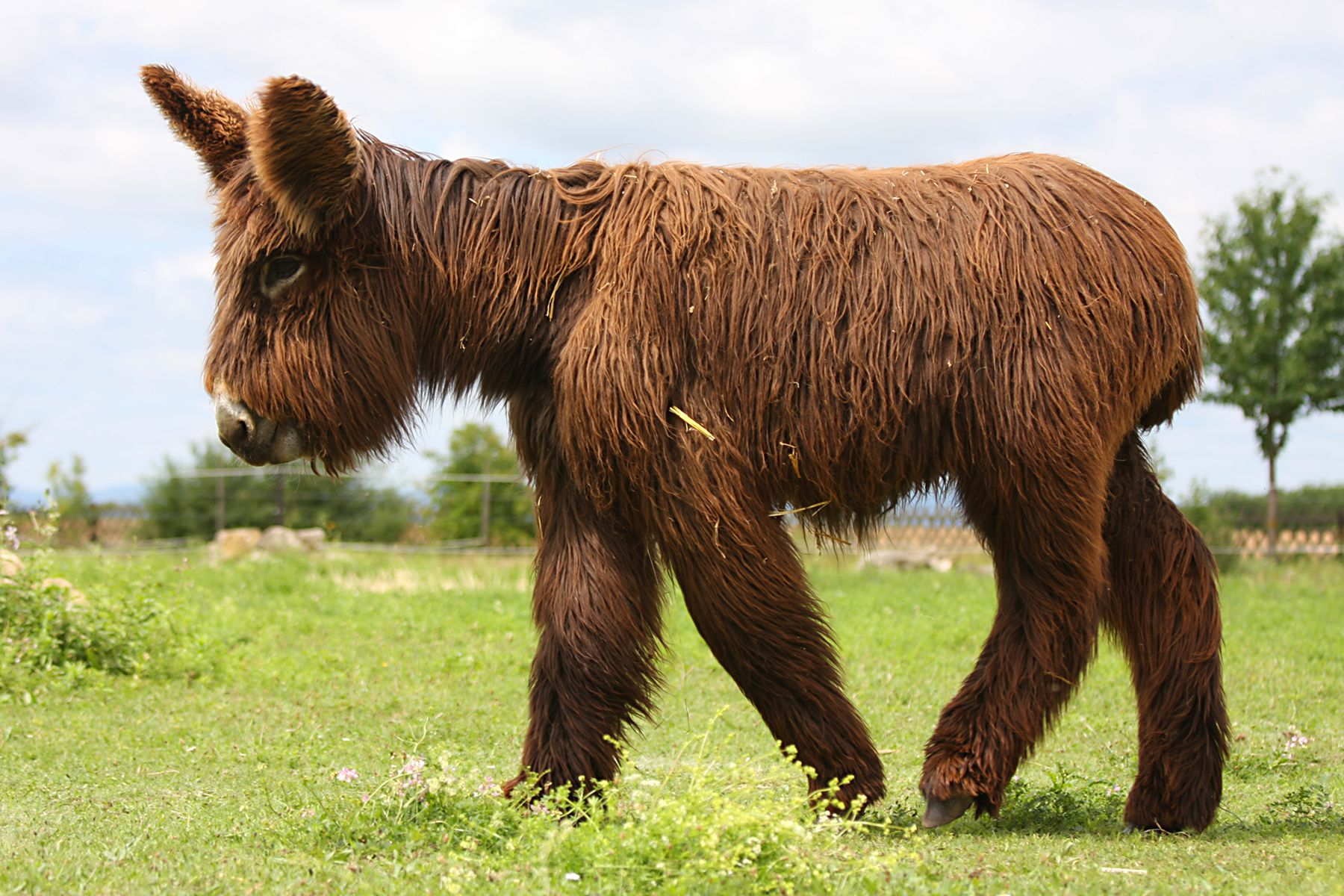
- Year-old jenny foal
- Conservation status: FAO (2007): endangered
- Other names: Baudet de Poitou; Poitou Donkey; Poitevin Donkey; Poitou Ass
- Country of origin: France
- Distribution: world-wide
- Standard: Haras Nationaux (in French)
- Use: siring mules

Traits
- Height: Male: 135–156 cm; Female: 135–145 cm
- Coat: dark bay

The Baudet du Poitou, also called the Poitevin or Poitou, is a French breed of donkey, it originates in – and is named for – the former province of Poitou in western France. It is among the largest of donkey breeds, and has a distinctive long coat, which traditionally was left to hang in ungroomed locks or cadenettes. It was recognised by the Haras Nationaux, the French national stud, in 1884.

The Baudet was traditionally used only for breeding mules – the word baudet means "donkey sire"; jacks (donkey stallions) were bred to Poitevin mares to produce Poitevin mules, which were formerly in great demand for agricultural and other work. The increasing mechanization of agriculture and transport in the twentieth century caused a sharp decline in numbers of the breed, which by 1977 had fallen to forty-four head. Conservation efforts by the Haras Nationaux and other organisations began in about 1980, and by 2005 the total number in France had reached some 450 head. Approximately 70% of the donkeys are in France; others are in Belgium, Germany, Sweden, Switzerland, Portugal, the United Kingdom and the United States.

== History ==
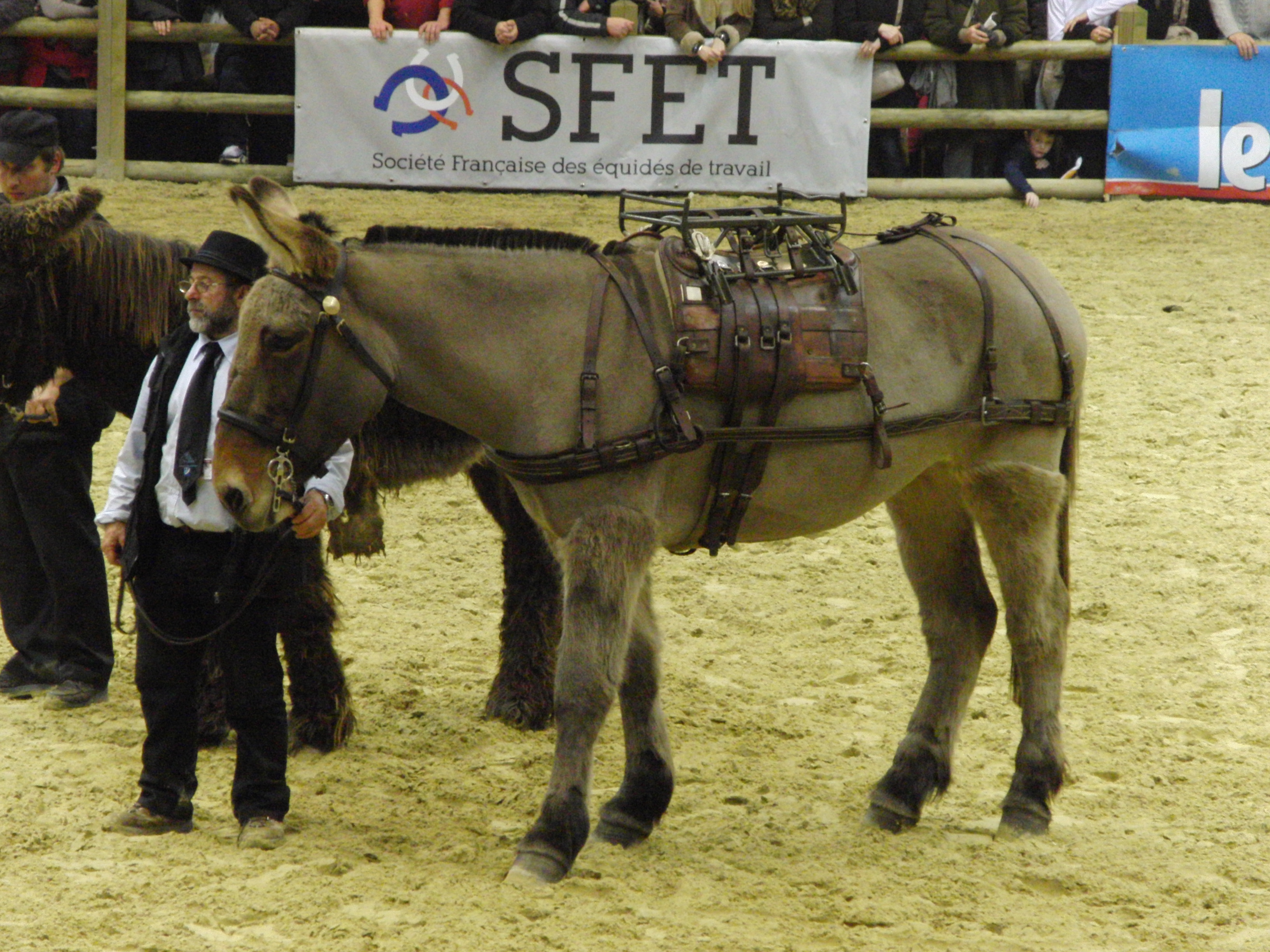
A Poitevin mule

The exact origins of the Poitou breed are unknown, but donkeys and their use in the breeding of mules may have been introduced to the Poitou region of France by the Roman Empire. The Baudet de Poitou and the Mulassière ('mule mare') horse breed (also known as the Poitevin) were developed together for the use of producing superior mules. In the Middle Ages, owning a Poitou donkey may have been a status symbol among the local French nobility. It is not known when the Poitou's distinctive characteristics were gained but they seem to have been well-developed by 1717 when an advisor to King Louis XV described:

There is found, in northern Poitou, donkeys which are as tall as large mules. They are almost completely covered in hair a half-foot long with legs and joints as large as a those of a carriage horse.

In the mid-1800s, Poitevin mules were "regarded as the finest and strongest in France", and between 15,000 and 18,000 were sold annually. In 1884, a studbook was established for the Poitou donkey in France. During the first half of the twentieth century, the mules bred by the Poitou and the Poitevin continued to be desired throughout Europe, and were called the "finest working mule in the world". Purchasers paid higher prices for Poitevin mules than for others, and up to 30,000 were bred annually in Poitou, with some estimates putting the number as high as 50,000. As mechanization increased around World War II, mules became outmoded, and population numbers for both mules and donkeys dropped dramatically.

Poitou donkey and mule breeders were extremely protective of their breeding practices, some of which were "highly unusual and misguided." Jacks were kept in closed-in stalls throughout the year once they had begun covering mares, in often unhygienic conditions. Once the mares had been covered, a folk belief held that if they were underfed, they would produce colts, which were more valuable, rather than fillies. This often led to mares being starved during their pregnancies.

Colostrum, vital for foal development, was considered unhealthy and withheld from newborns. A lack of breeding records resulted in fertility problems, and there was a significant amount of foal mortality, due to jacks being used to cover horse mares before jennies of their own kind, resulting in late-born foals that were vulnerable to cold fall and winter temperatures. Despite these husbandry issues, one author, writing in 1883, stated that "mule-breeding is about the only branch of agricultural industry in which France has no rival abroad, owing its prosperity entirely to the zeal of those engaged in it."

=== Conservation efforts ===
A breed census in 1977 found only 44 Poitou donkeys worldwide, and in 1980 there were still fewer than 80 animals. Conservation efforts were led by several public and private groups in France. In 1979, the Haras Nationaux, (the French national stud) and the Parc Naturel Regional du Marais Poitevin, working with private breeders, launched an effort to improve the genetics of the Poitou, develop new breeding techniques and collect traditional knowledge on the breed. In 1981, 18 large donkeys from Portugal were acquired for use in breeding Poitou donkeys. This preceded the creation of the Asinerie Nationale Experimentale, which opened in Charente-Maritime in Dampierre-sur-Boutonne in 1982, as an experimental breeding farm.

The Parc also works to preserve the Poitevin horse breed. In 1988, the Association pour la Sauvegarde du Baudet du Poitou (SABAUD) was formed as a breeder network that focuses on marketing and fundraising for the breed, and in 1989 became the financial support arm of the Asinerie Nationale Experimentale. The Association des Éleveurs des Races Équine, Mulassière et Asine, Baudet du Poitou is the registering body for the Poitou donkey. The early conservation efforts were sometimes sidetracked as some breeders sold crossbred Poitous as purebreds, which are worth up to ten times as much. Forged pedigrees and registration papers were sometimes used to legitimize these sales. However, by the 1990s, DNA testing and microchip technology began to be used to identify and track purebred animals.

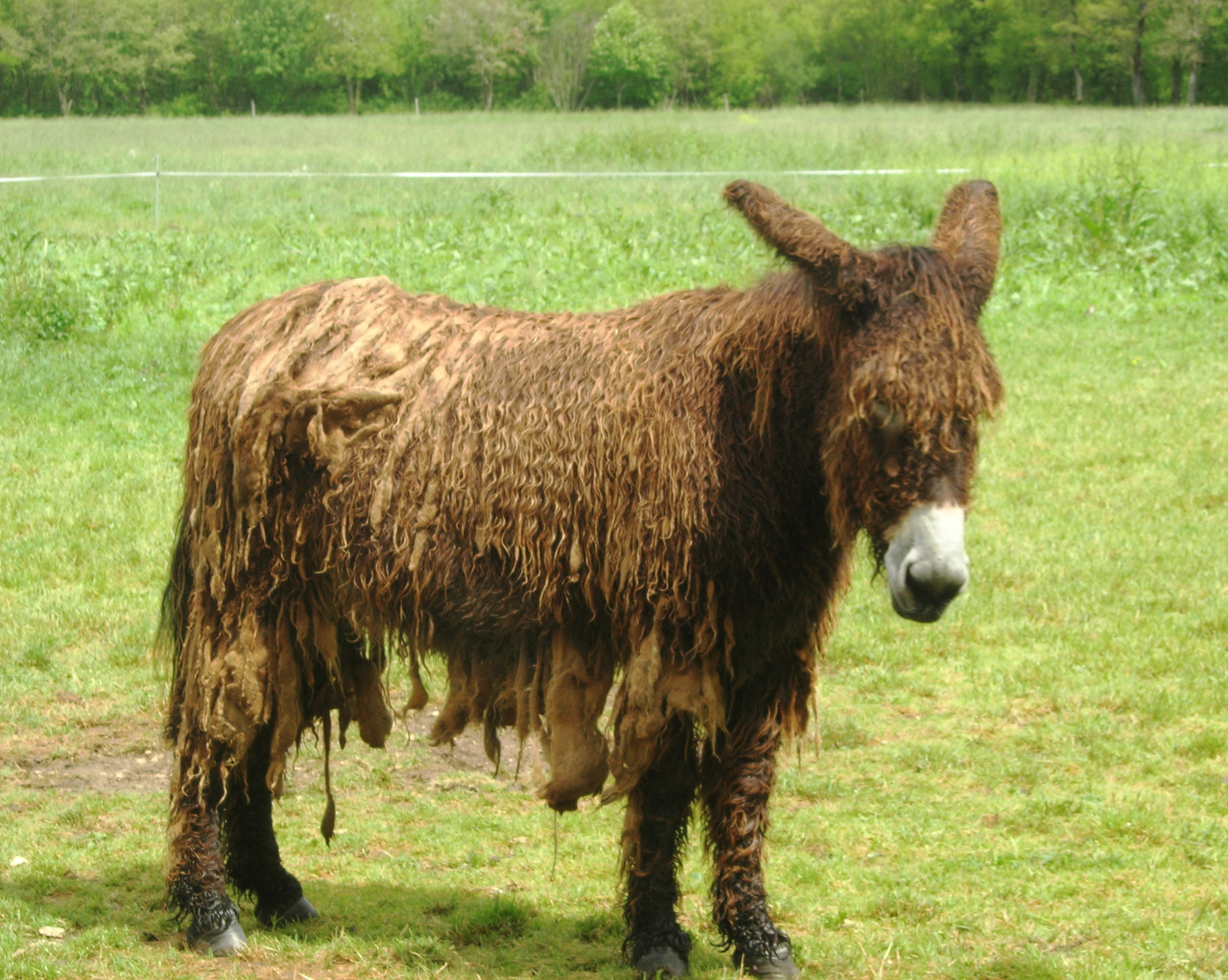
A bourailloux coat

The conservation efforts in the latter decades of the twentieth century and the early years of the twenty-first were successful, and a 2005 survey revealed 450 purebred registered animals. This number had dropped below 400 by 2011. The French stud-book for the breed is split into two sections. The first, Livre A, is for purebred animals with documented Poitou parentage on both sides of their pedigree. The second, Livre B, is for animals with one purebred Poitou parent. The American Livestock Breeds Conservancy lists the Poitou as "critical" on its Conservation Priority List, a category for breeds with less than 2,000 animals worldwide and less than 200 registrations annually in the US.

In 2001, scientists in Australia successfully implanted a Poitou embryo created by artificial insemination in the womb of a Standardbred mare. Worries that joint problems might prevent a healthy pregnancy in the foal's biological mother led to the initiative. The resultant foal became one of three Poitou donkeys in Australia. The procedure was unusual because it is often difficult for members of one Equus species to accept implanted embryos from another species in the same genus.

=== In the United States ===
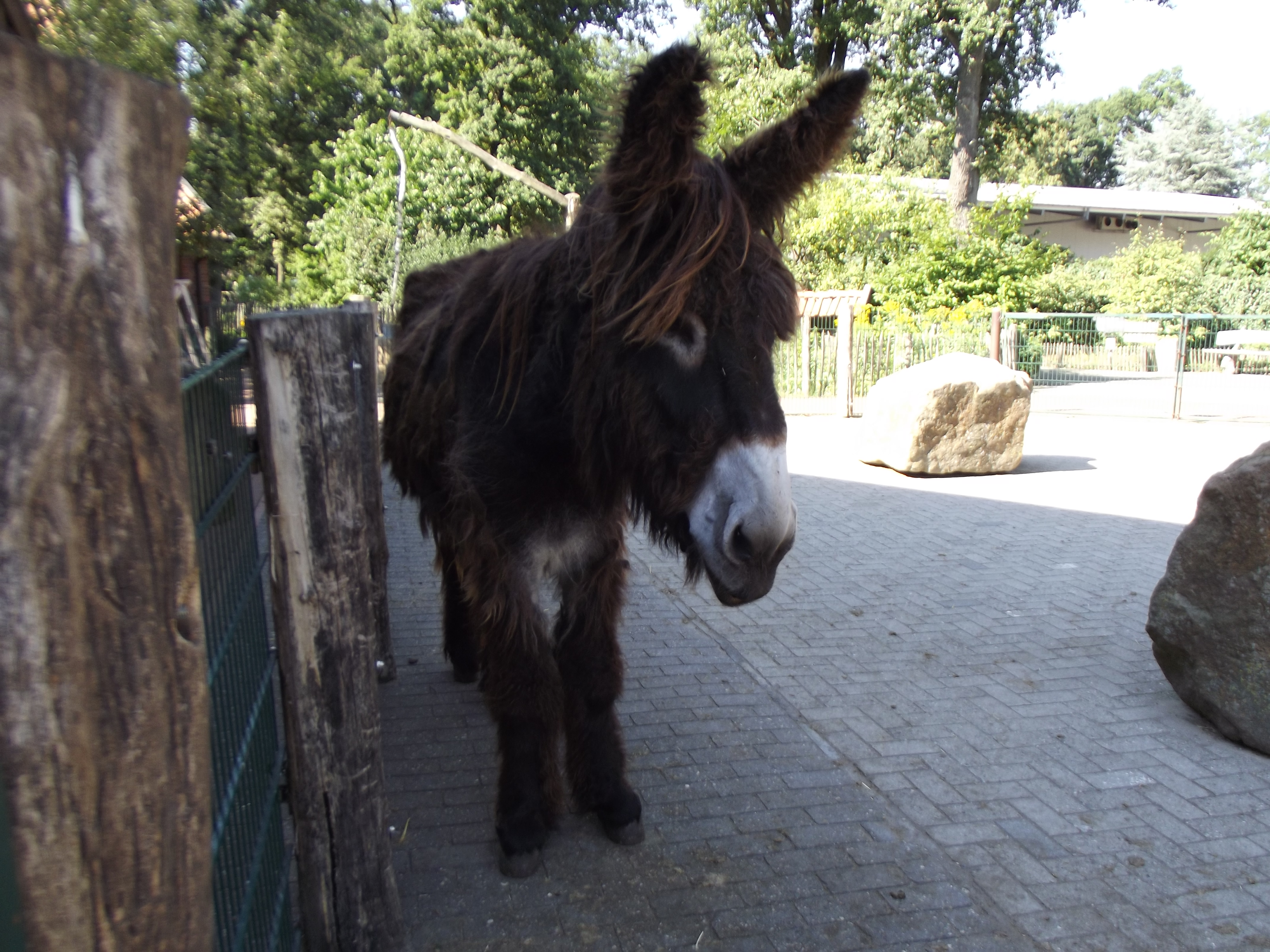
On a museum farm in Nordhorn

Historical records exist of several sets of exports of Poitous from France to the US during the nineteenth and early twentieth centuries, including a 1910 import of 10 donkeys. Most of these were integrated into the generic pool of donkey bloodstock, rather than being bred pure. During this time, Poitous were used in the creation of the American Mammoth Jack breed. Due to high purchase and transportation costs, the breed played a smaller role in the development of the Mammoth Jack than some breeders would have preferred.

Imports to the US continued until at least 1937, when a successful breeding jack name Kaki, who stood 16.2 hands (66 inches, 168 cm) high, was brought to the country. The 1940s through the 1960s saw a dearth of Poitou imports, and only a few arrived between 1978 and the 1990s. By 1996, there were estimated to only be around 30 Poitous in North America.

In 1996, Debbie Hamilton, an American, founded the Hamilton Rare Breeds Foundation on a 440-acre (180 ha) farm in Hartland, Vermont, to breed Poitou donkeys. As of 2004, she owned 26 purebred and 14 partbred Poitous, making hers the largest Poitou breeding operation in the United States, and the second largest in the world, behind the French government-sponsored experimental farm. Hamilton works with French officials toward the preservation of the breed, and has received praise from French veterinarians, who appreciate her technical and financial contributions to the breed.

Techniques for using cryopreservation to develop a sperm bank for Poitou donkeys have been in development in France since at least 1997, but Hamilton has pioneered the use of artificial insemination using frozen semen in the breed, in order to use genetic material from France to improve Poitou herds in the US. The North American Baudet de Poitou Society, organized by the American Donkey and Mule Society, is the American registry for the breed, coordinating with French officials for inspections and registrations of American-bred Poitou stock.

== Characteristics ==
The Baudet is a large breed: the ideal minimum height at the withers is 1.40 m (55 in) for jacks and 1.35 m (53 in) for jennies. In order to breed large mules, the original breeders of the Poitou chose animals with large features, such as ears, heads and leg joints. The ears developed to such an extent that their weight sometimes causes them to be carried horizontally.

They have large, long heads, strong necks, long backs, short croups and round haunches. The limb joints and feet are large, and the legs strong. The temperament has been described as "friendly, affectionate and docile".

In Poitou, the coat of the Baudet was traditionally – and deliberately – left ungroomed; with time, it formed cadenettes, long shaggy locks somewhat like dreadlocks. These sometimes became so long that they reached the ground; a Baudet with such a long coat was termed bourailloux or guenilloux. The genes responsible for the unusual coat type are recessive, so Poitou mules do not exhibit the trait, and cross-bred donkeys do not exhibit it unless of a related donkey breed that occasionally carries the same genes.

The coat is dark bay, ranging from dark brown to black; it may also be fougère, in which the silver-grey surround of the mouth and eyes has a reddish border. The underbelly and the insides of the thighs are pale. It may not display either rubican markings ("white ticking"), nor a dorsal mule-stripe.

== Use ==
The Baudet was traditionally used only for breeding mules; the word baudet means "donkey sire", but is used to describe the breed as a whole. With the decline of mule-breeding, some may be used for agricultural work, for driving or for riding.
