= Cambar =

Autosexing breed of chicken

The Cambar is the first autosexing breed of chicken intentionally created, and the first autosexing breed of poultry in general. The Cambar was developed by Reginald Punnett and Michael Pease in 1929. The Cambar was a mixture of the Barred Plymouth Rock and the Gold Campine.

== History ==
The Cambar was first shown at the Third World Poultry Congress in 1930. The breed was standardized in 1947.

== See also ==
- Legbar
- Bielefelder
