= Legbar =

British breed of chicken

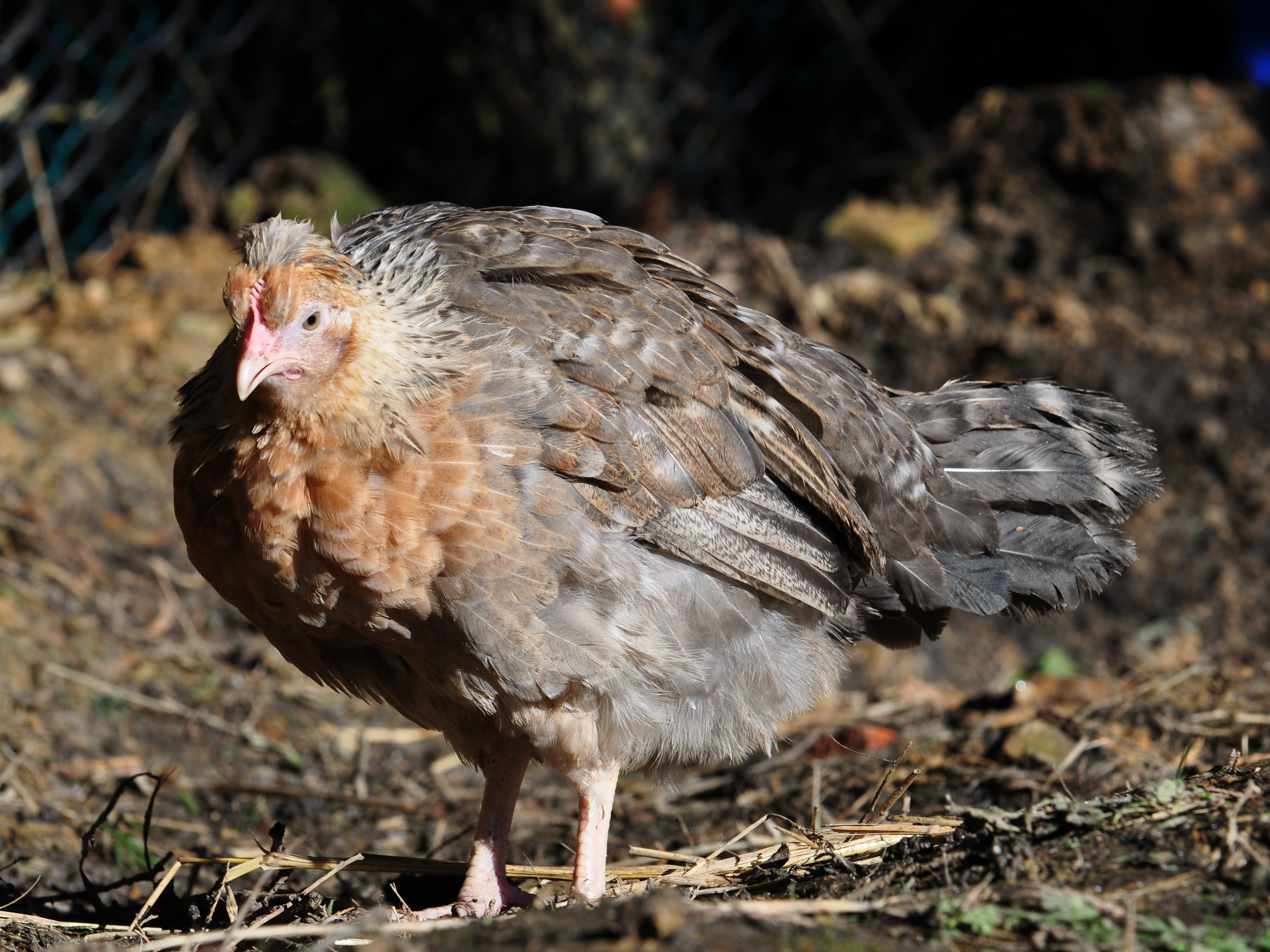

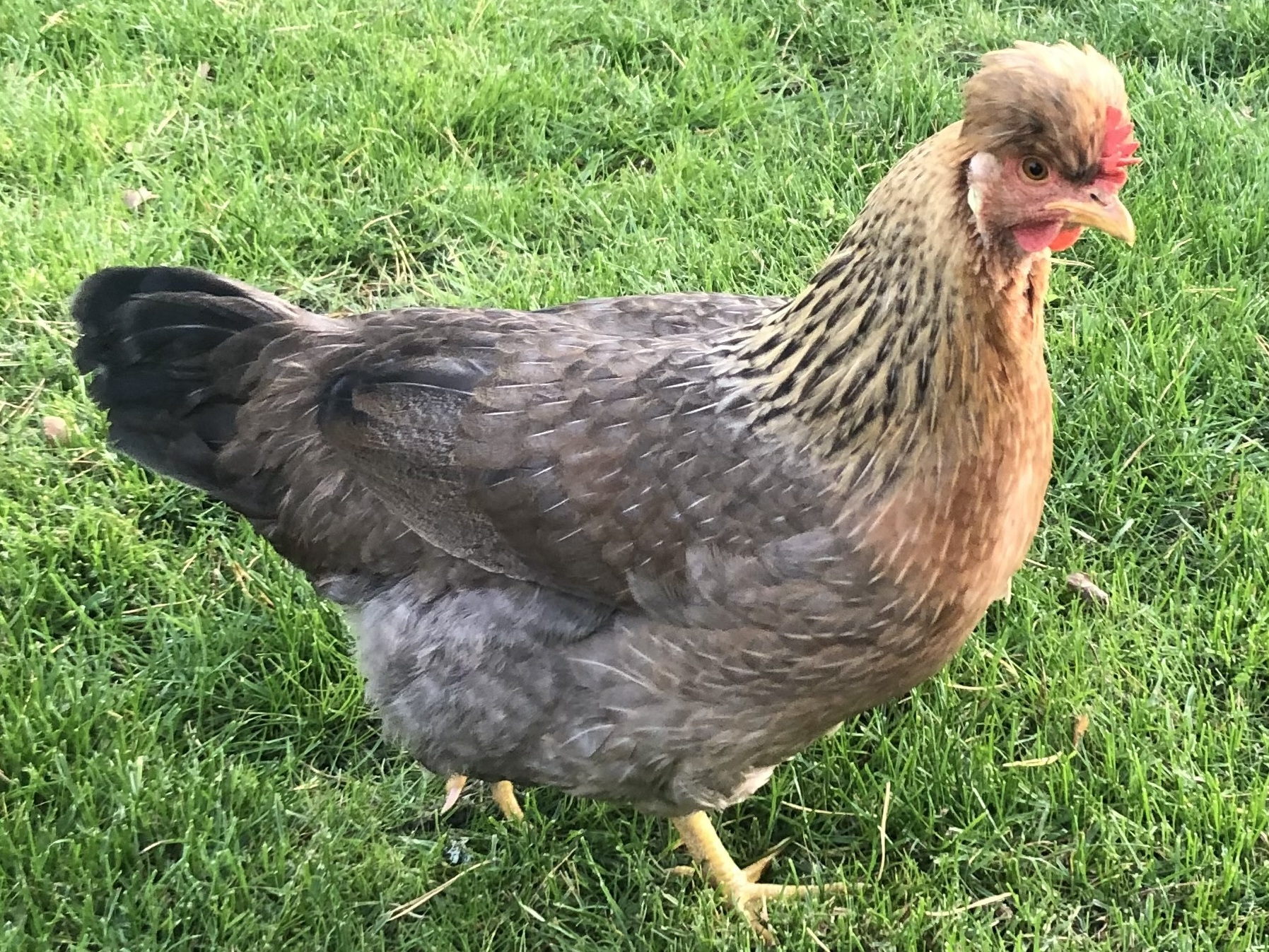
- Conservation status: RBST (2014): at risk; RBST (2026): priority; DAD-IS (2026): unknown
- Country of origin: United Kingdom
- Distribution: Ireland; New Zealand; United Kingdom
- Use: eggs

Traits
- Weight: Male: 2.7–3.4 kg; Female: 2.0–2.7 kg
- Egg colour: Legbar: white or cream; Cream Legbar: blue or green
- Comb type: single, large

Classification
- APA: no
- EE: listed, not recognised
- PCGB: soft feather: light
- Chicken; Gallus gallus domesticus

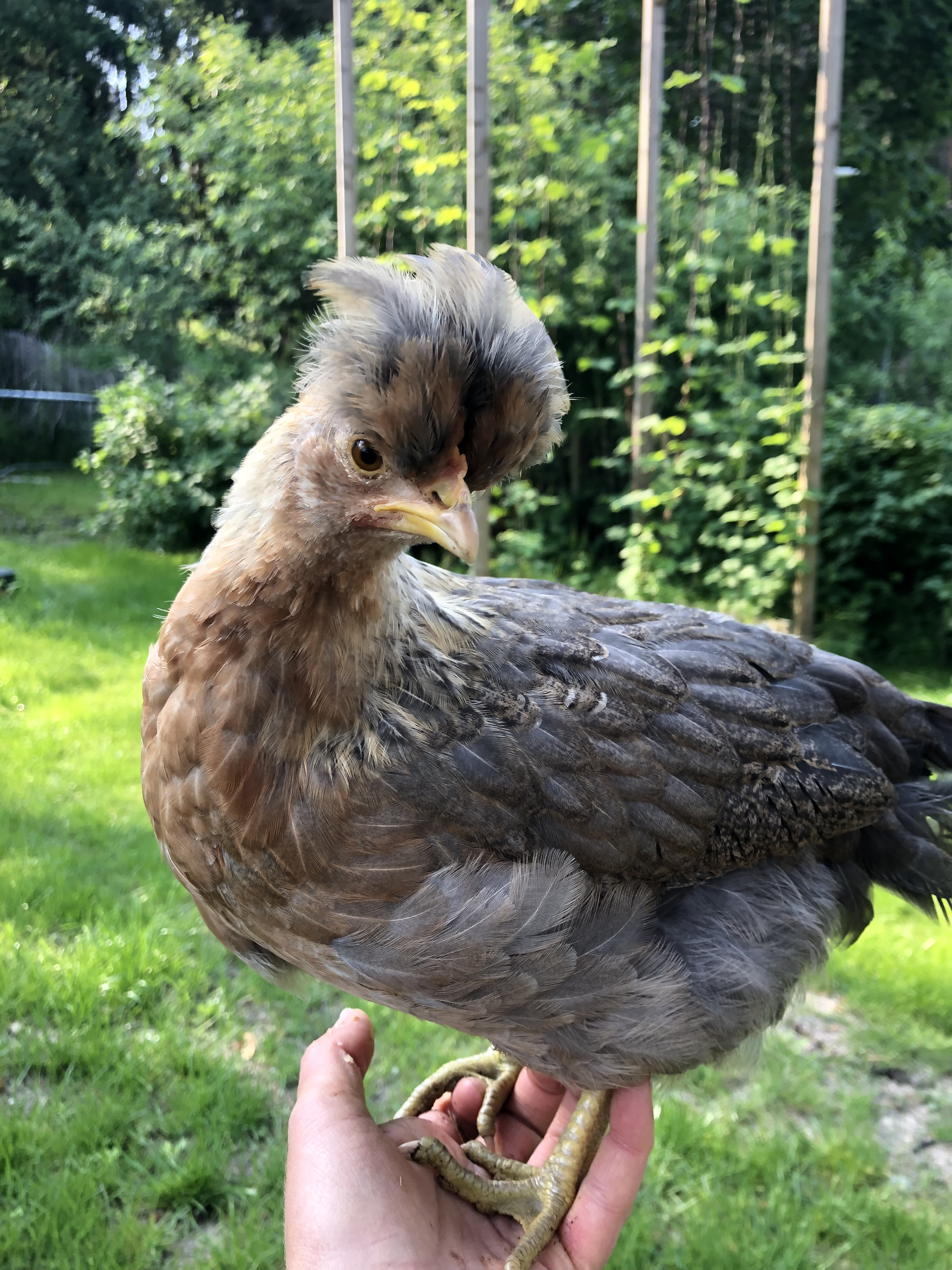
A 12-week-old cream pullet

The Legbar is a British breed of auto-sexing chicken. It was created in the early twentieth century by Reginald Crundall Punnett and Michael Pease at the Genetical Institute of Cambridge University. They cross-bred American barred Plymouth Rock birds with brown Leghorns and created the gold and silver colour varieties. Pease created a cream Legbar by cross-breeding these with white Leghorns; later crossing with Araucanas caused this to have a crest and to lay blue or blue-green eggs.

In the twenty-first century it is an endangered breed, with a world-wide conservation status of ‘at risk’.

== History ==
The Legbar was the second auto-sexing chicken breed created by Reginald Crundall Punnett and Michael Pease at the Genetical Institute of Cambridge University, after the Cambar, which was created in 1929 by crossing barred Plymouth Rock with gold Campine birds.

The Legbar arose from cross-breeding of Plymouth Rock birds with brown Leghorns, which at that time were two of the principal egg-laying breeds. As with the Cambar, they set out to breed a bird that would both have brown down and carry the barred gene (B), so that chicks would have sex-linked plumage differences that could easily be distinguished. Standards for the gold and silver colour varieties were drawn up in 1945 and 1951 respectively.

The cream Legbar was created by chance. Through cross-breeding of gold Legbars with white Leghorn stock, Pease had obtained some cream-coloured birds; their eggs were white, and they had no crest. An experimental crossing of these with some cream-coloured Araucanas from Punnett's laboratory led to the creation of the cream Legbar, a crested layer of coloured eggs for which a standard was drawn up in 1958. Within a short time it became very rare, but has since recovered. It is treated by the Poultry Club of Great Britain as a colour variety of the Legbar, but is considered by the Rare Breed Survival Trust to be a separate breed.

In the twenty-first century the Legbar is an endangered breed. It is reported by three countries: Ireland, New Zealand and the United Kingdom. No population is reported by Ireland or the United Kingdom, so its conservation status in those countries is unknown; for New Zealand a total number of 100 birds was reported for 2024, and its conservation status there is ‘at risk’, as is its status world-wide. Like all native breeds of poultry, the Legbar and the Cream Legbar are listed as ‘priority’ on the watchlist of the Rare Breed Survival Trust for 2026–2027.

== Characteristics ==
The Legbar has three colour varieties: gold, silver and cream. The cream variant has a crest and lays blue, olive or green eggs. The Legbar is considered a rare breed by the Poultry Club of Great Britain; until the Autosexing Breeds Association was re-formed in 2016, it fell under the Rare Poultry Society.

== Use ==
The Legbar was bred as an auto-sexing layer breed. Hens may give 180 eggs or more per year.
