= Texan Pioneer =

Breed of pigeon

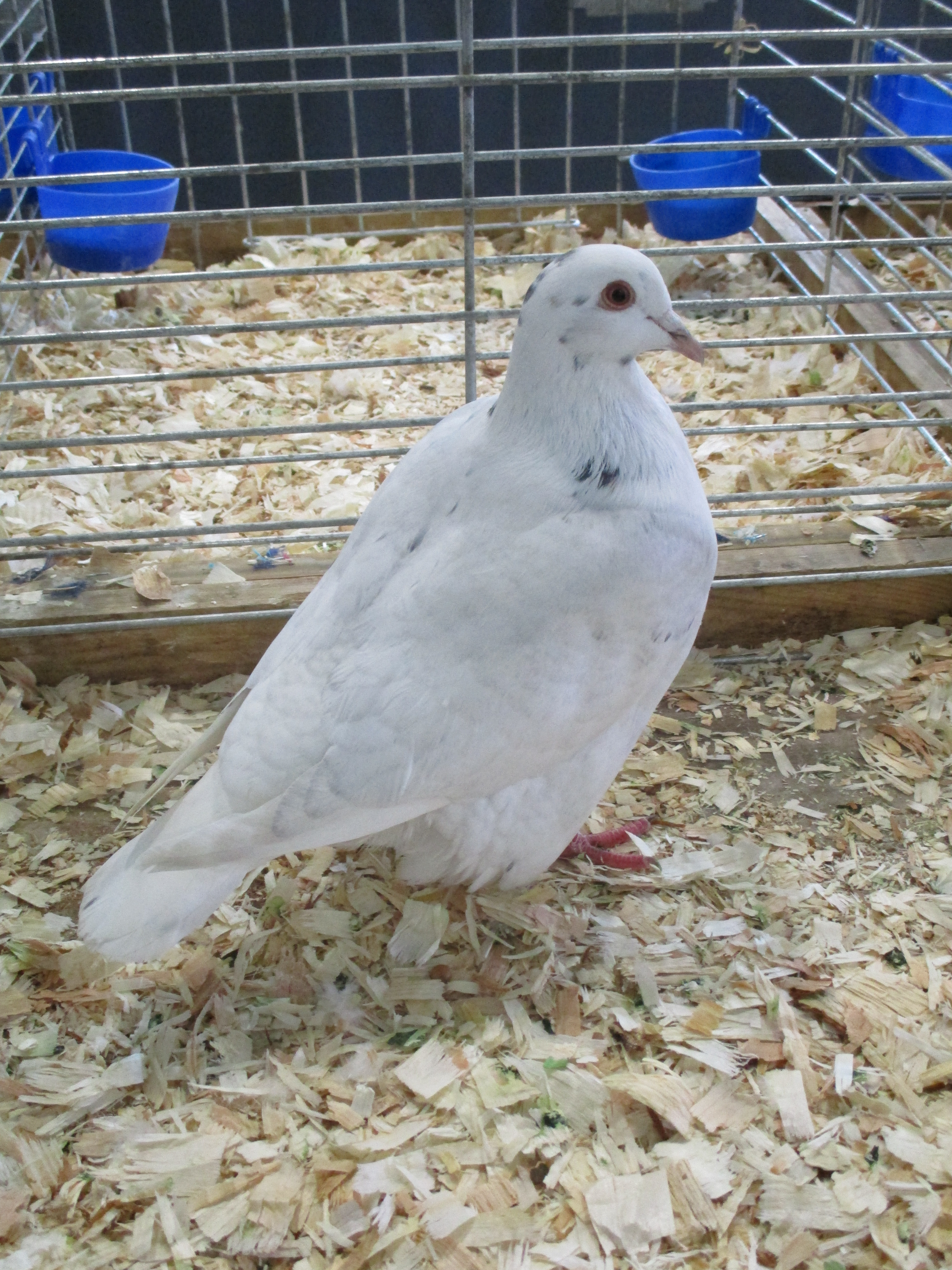
- Young Texan Cock
- Conservation status: common
- Other names: Auto-sex Texan
- Country of origin: United States

Traits
- Crest type: None
- Feather ornamentation: None

Classification
- Australian Breed Group: Not listed
- US Breed Group: Form
- EE Breed Group: Formentuaben

Notes
- NPA band size K

The Texan Pioneer is a breed of fancy pigeon developed over many years of selective breeding. The Texan Pioneer, along with other varieties of domesticated pigeons, are all descendants from the rock pigeon (Columba livia).

== Characteristics ==
The breed has two major distinguishing characteristics, both due to its origin as a utility (meat-producing) breed:

(1) The head and feet are supposed to be small in proportion to the rest of the body, the rationale being that it is senseless to add weight to parts of the bird that are discarded when the bird is butchered. This makes the most efficient squab producer possible. This means that squabs are not only plump, but also have an exceptionally high dress out (eviscerated) to live weight ratio. Desirable parents are fast producers, good feeders, are not overly large, have high disease resistance, and a long productive breeding life. This requirement called for the development of a terrific breast. This perfect squabbing pigeon was quickly recognized for its show quality, so the show type Texan Pioneer came into being. The Auto-Sex Texan Pioneer has tight feathering, broad breast, short tail and wings, and has a fairly straight back and tail line. The mature birds will weigh between 28 and 34 ounces in prime condition. The average squab weighs 24 ounces live weight at 30 days of age.

(2) The second characteristic of the breed is that it is pure for the Faded factor (gene). This makes the Texan Pioneer an "auto-sex" breed, whereby the sex of all young can be determined shortly after hatching by their plumage color. The Faded gene is located on one of the sex chromosomes, which allows it to be used for auto-sexing. Since pigeon cocks carry two active sex chromosomes while the hens have only one, the expression of the Faded gene in cocks causes more fading, as hens can only have one copy. The homozygous cocks appear mostly white with dark flecks on the head and neck, while the hens present with a muted color of the pigment gene they have. This phenomenon is different from "sex-linked mating".

=== Colors ===
Colors: blue, black, ash-red, and recessive red Band size: NPA size K

== Status ==
Common: The (National Pigeon Association) NPA recognized the Texan Pioneer as a new breed at the National Pigeon Show in Lafayette, Louisiana in 1961. It was introduced as a utility breed and breeders began showing the birds in competitions. They have been exhibited at most NPA shows since, as well as other major shows throughout the United States. They are now also seen in Europe and all over the world.

== Origin ==
Whereas the origin of most breeds of pigeons may be rather obscure in history, the origin of the Texan Pioneer is very definite as to time, place, breeds used, and purpose. The Texan Pioneer is truly an American breed, created by Del James during 1953. It is a large breed, similar in size to the French Mondain and the King, which were used for its creation. During its creation it was called the Auto-sex Texan. When development was finished, since it was created in Texas, the final name adopted was Texan Pioneer

== Basic needs ==
Pigeons are fed either a raw whole grain or a pellet mix designed specifically for pigeons. There are mixes on the market designed specifically for pigeons. Inorganic materials are also needed in their diets, including salts, minerals, and calcium. Mixes made specifically for pigeons are readily available, called pigeon grit. Clean water is naturally also required. Pigeons suck water to drink, as you do with a straw. A container with at least one inch or more of free standing water is perfect.

== Gallery ==
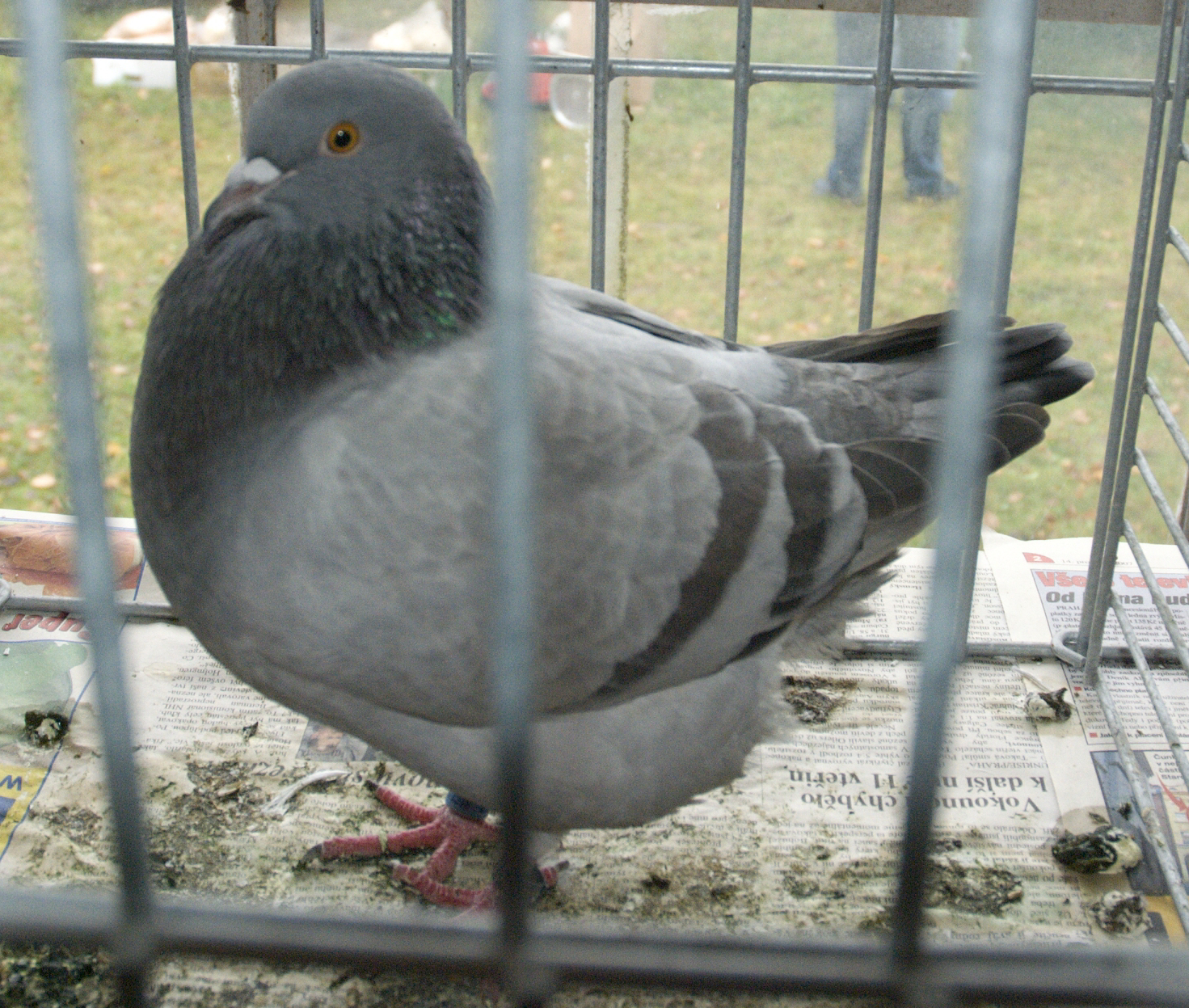
Blue bar

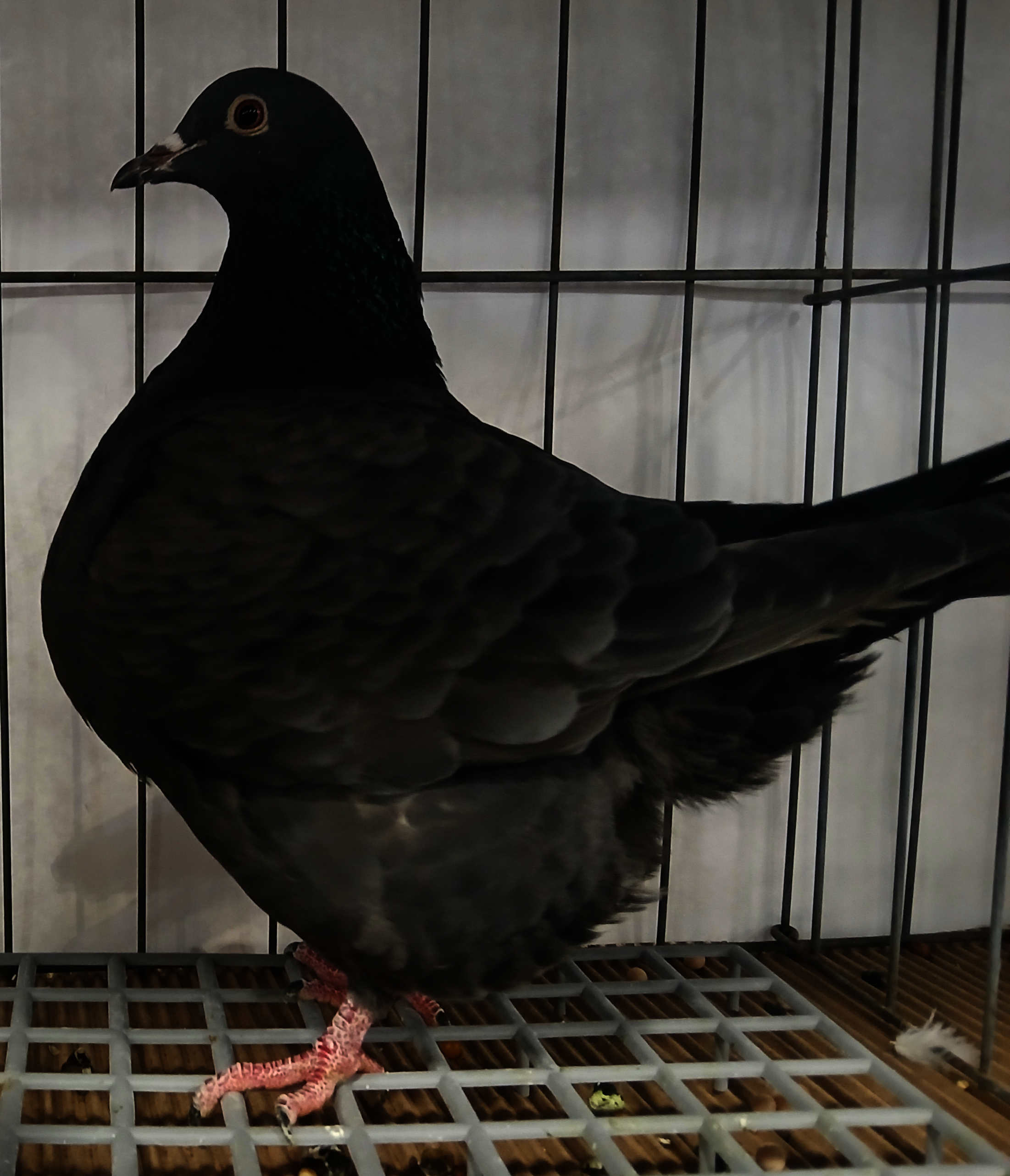
Black

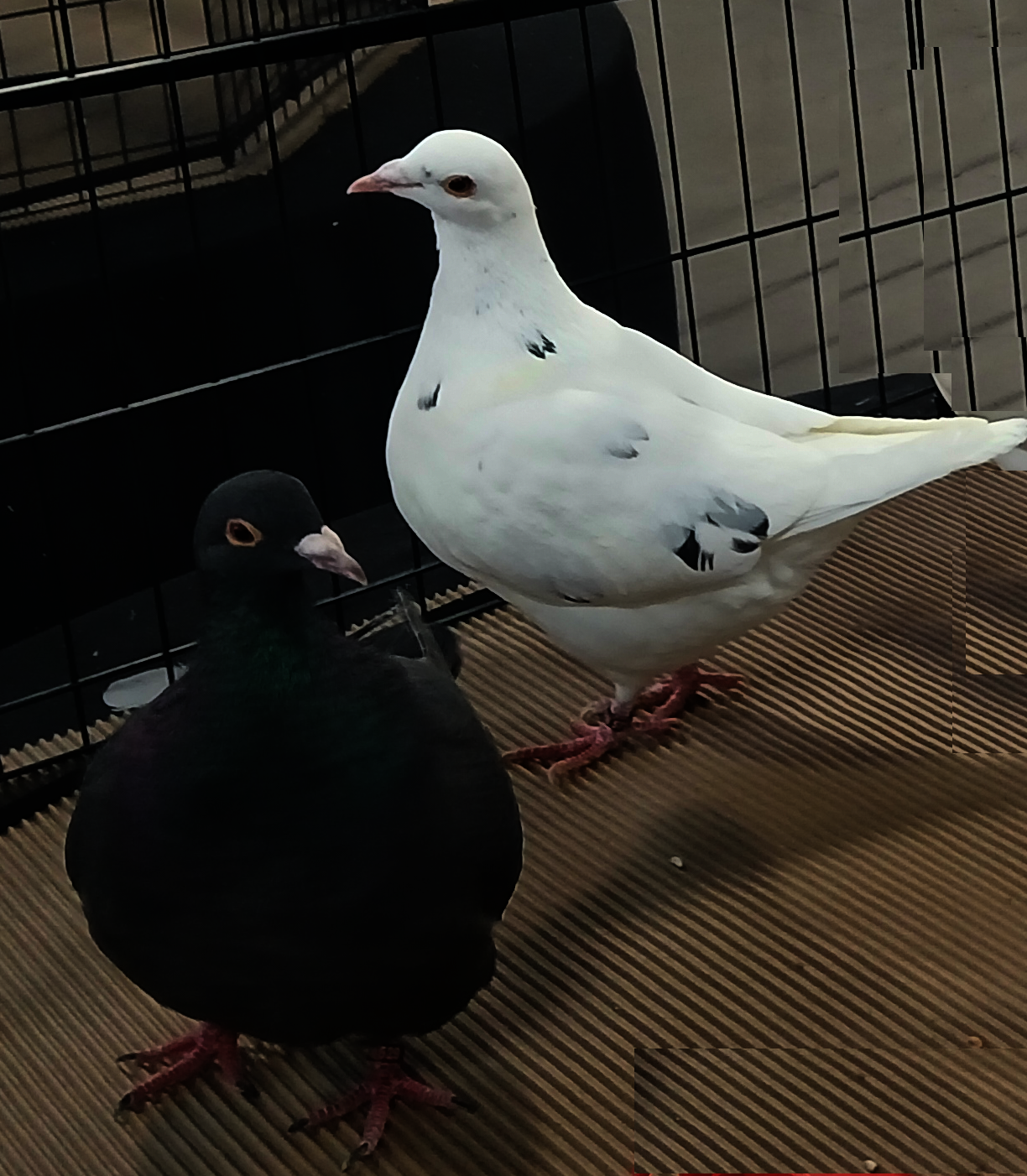
Pair

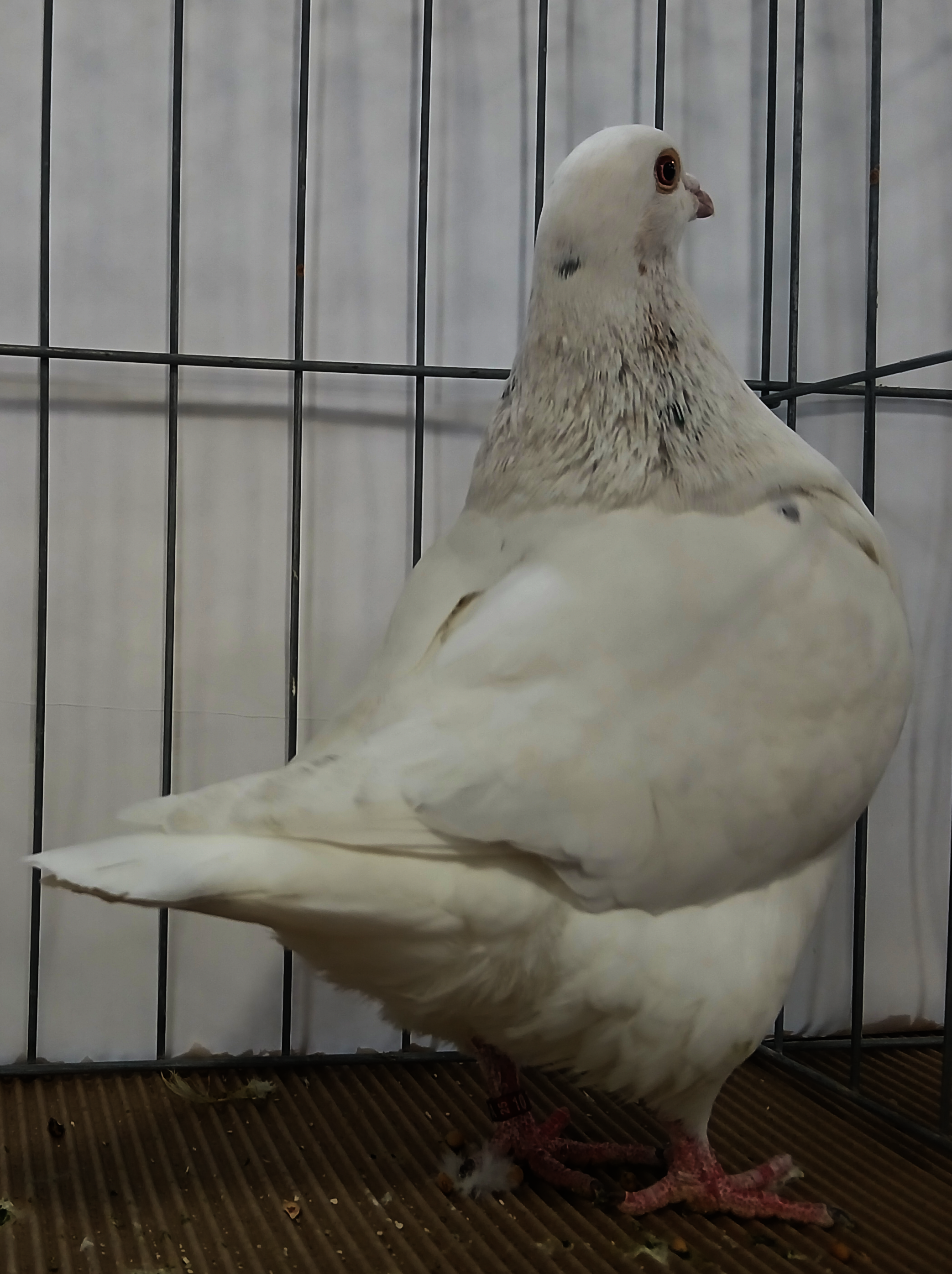
White

== See also ==
- List of pigeon breeds
