= Red link =

Red link may refer to:

- Red Link Communications, an ISP in Myanmar
- Red Sex Link, a cross-breed of chicken
- A link to a red node in the red–black tree data structure
- Red Link, one of the four Links from the game The Legend of Zelda: A Link to the Past & Four Swords
