= Dewlap (pigeon) =

Breed of pigeon

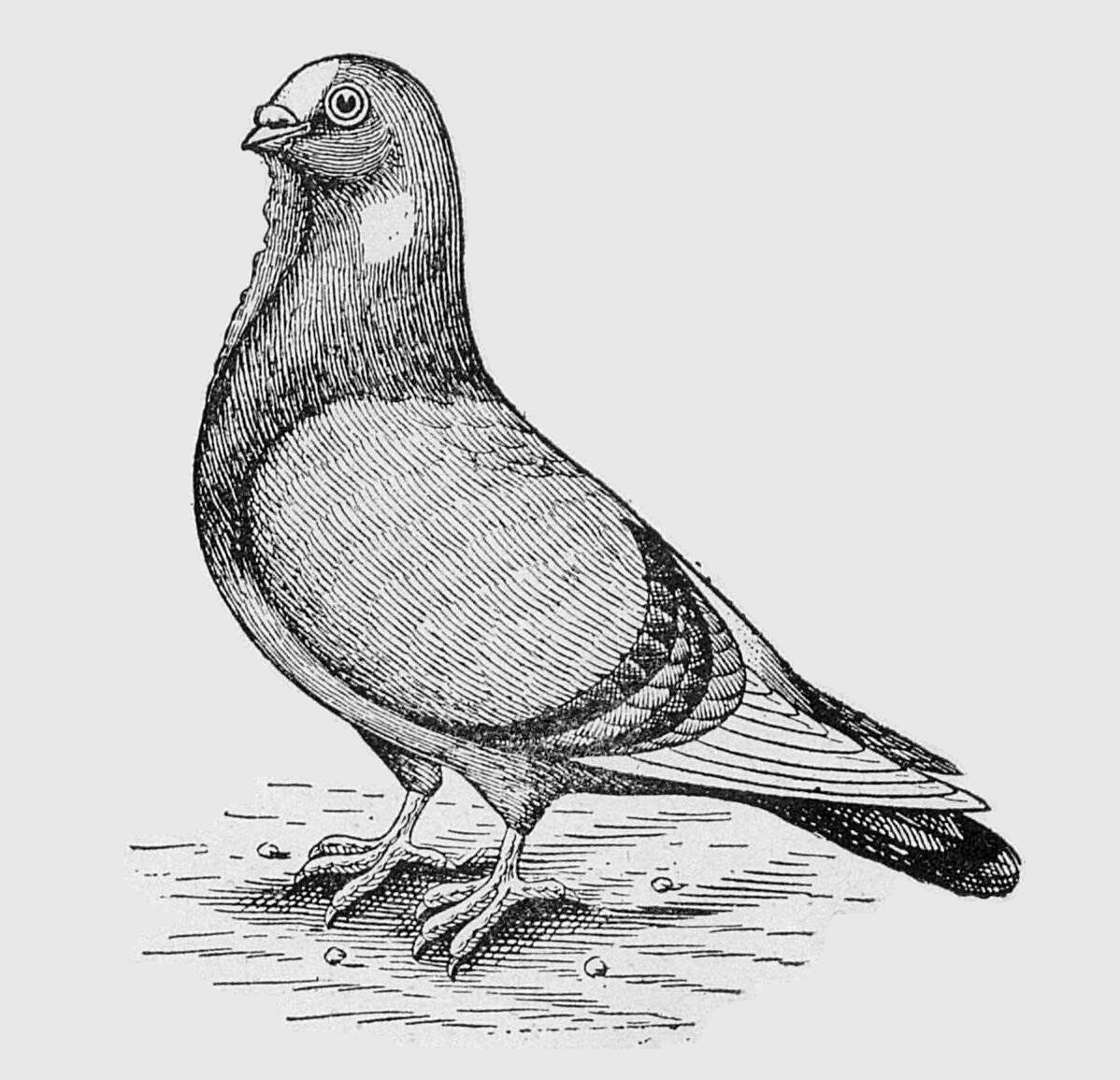
- Conservation status: Rare
- Other names: Syrian Dewlap
- Country of origin: Middle East

Classification
- Australian Breed Group: Group 4 Syrian Dewlap
- US Breed Group: Syrian
- EE Breed Group: Utility

Notes
- A breed of antiquity, primarily known for the dewlap

The Dewlap is a breed of pigeon developed in antiquity through selective breeding, and, as with the other varieties of domesticated pigeons, is descended from the rock dove (Columba livia). Lyell believed they arrived from Asia Minor via China, and therefore named it the Chinese Dewlap. Modern day writers also note that the breed originated in the Middle East. It was imported into the United States by S.M. Shadeed of Jacksonville. N. C.

== Characteristics ==
The breed's name derives from the pronounced dewlap, or gullet, which is its most distinguishing mark. It is of medium size, weighing about 22 ounces. It is rather slender, yet with a wide breast, and stands more upright than horizontal. Most Dewlaps have from 7 to 10 white flights, fitting tightly to the body, and lying upon the tail. Three variants exist. The Earring, the Frilled, and the Reehani. The Frilled (mfattel), have curly feathers, similar to those of Frillbacks. The Earring have white patches on their neck, resembling earrings. And the Reehani is an auto-sexing type similar to the Texan Pioneer, in which the males are always paler colored than the females.

=== Colors ===
- 1. Blue (Ablaq), bar (Khodr) or check (Bhalles),
- 2. Black (Msawad)
- 3. Ash red (Mawardi-rose water).

== Status ==
The breed remains rare in the United States, but is supported by the Rare Breeds Pigeon Club.

== Gallery ==
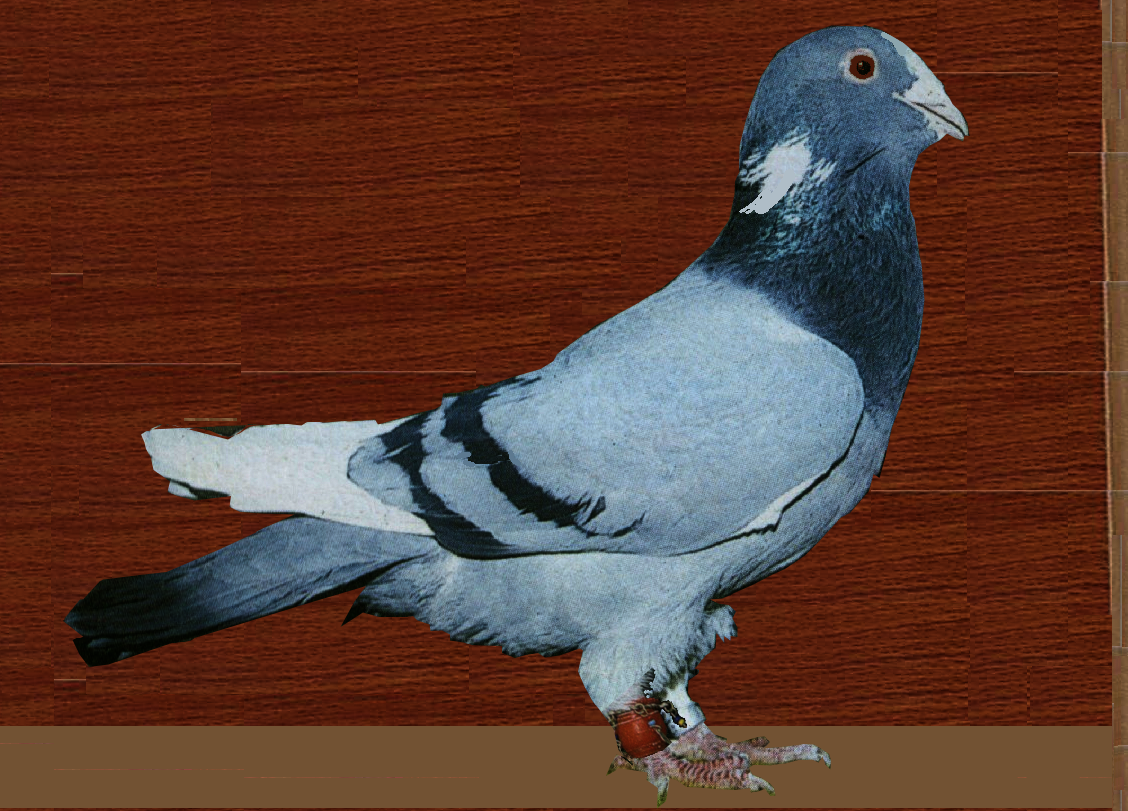
Earring blue bar

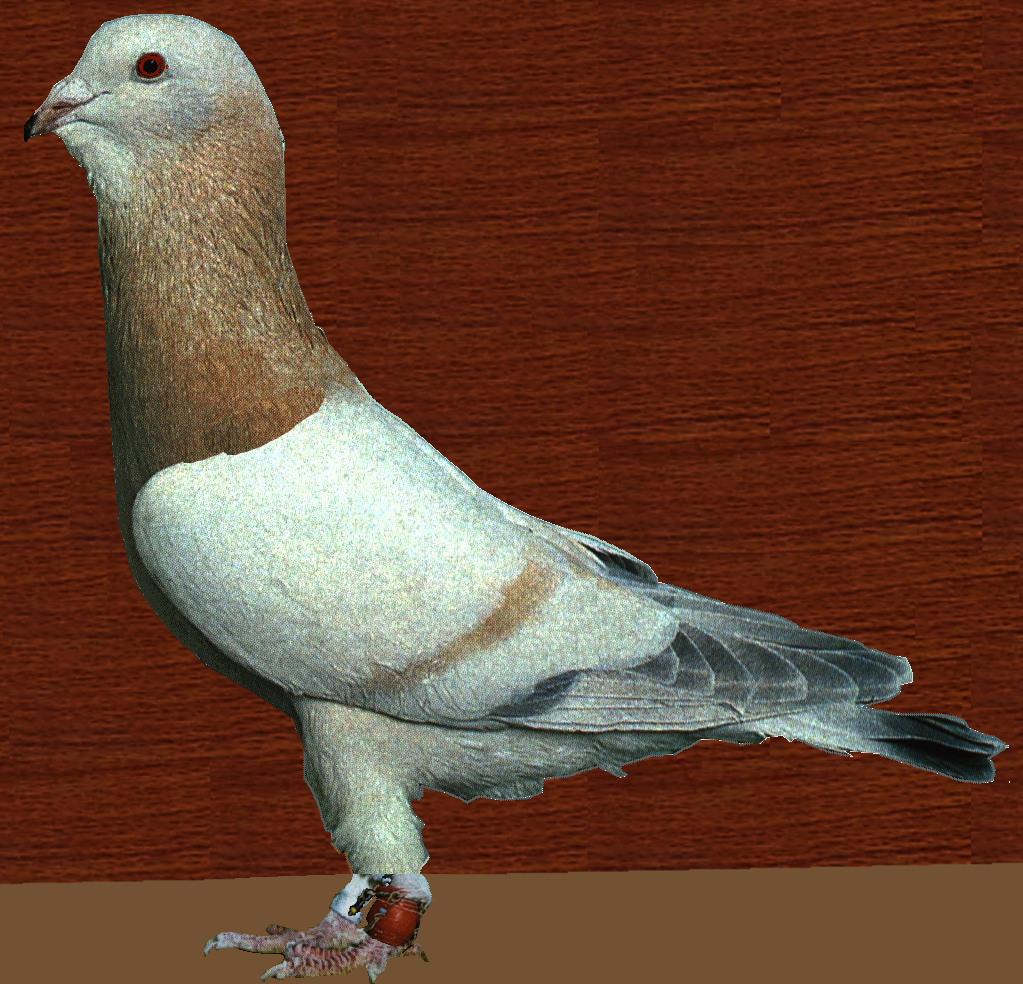
Reehani old hen

== See also ==
- List of pigeon breeds
- Pigeon keeping
