= California Gray =

American breed of chicken

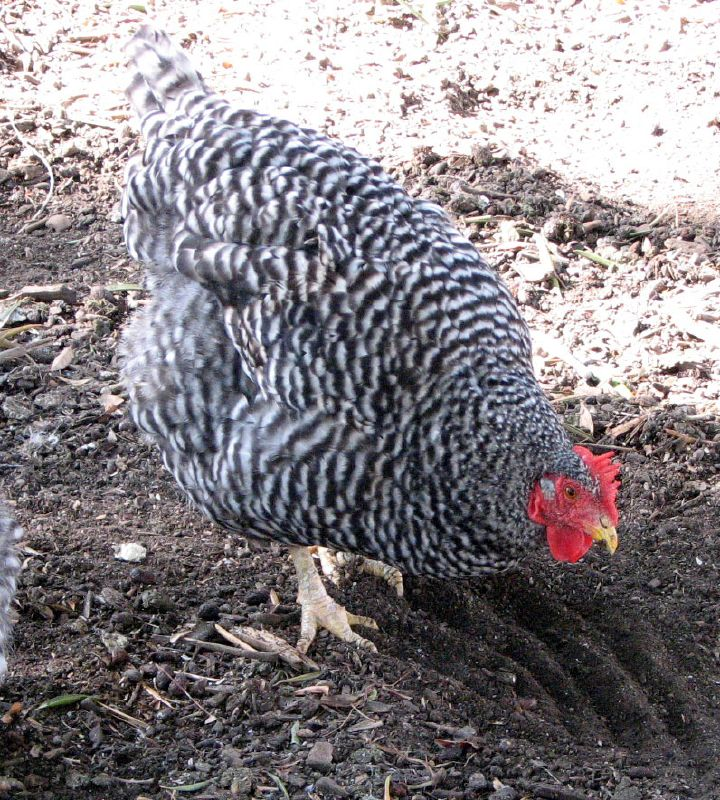
- Other names: production black
- Country of origin: United States

Traits
- Weight: Male: 2.5 kg (5.5 lb); Female: 2.0 kg (4.4 lb)
- Egg color: white

Classification
- APA: not listed
- Chicken; Gallus gallus domesticus

The California Gray is an American breed of domestic chicken. It may be also known as the "production black".

== History ==
The California Gray was developed in California in the 1930s by Horace Dryden in Modesto, California. His aim was to produce a dual-purpose chicken that would be suitable for meat production and would also lay large white eggs. By cross-breeding of Barred Plymouth Rock and White Leghorn birds, an autosexing breed with barred gray adult plumage was produced. As in other autosexing breeds, the sex of chicks can be distinguished at about a day old.

The California Gray was never recognized as a breed by the American Poultry Association, and in the twenty-first century is a rare breed. It is not listed on the conservation priority list of the Livestock Conservancy, and is not reported to the DAD-IS database of the FAO.

== Use ==
The California Gray is a dual-purpose bird, producing both meat and eggs. Cocks are crossed with White Leghorn hens to produce the California White commercial sex-link hybrid.
