= Silverudd Blue =

Swedish breed of chicken

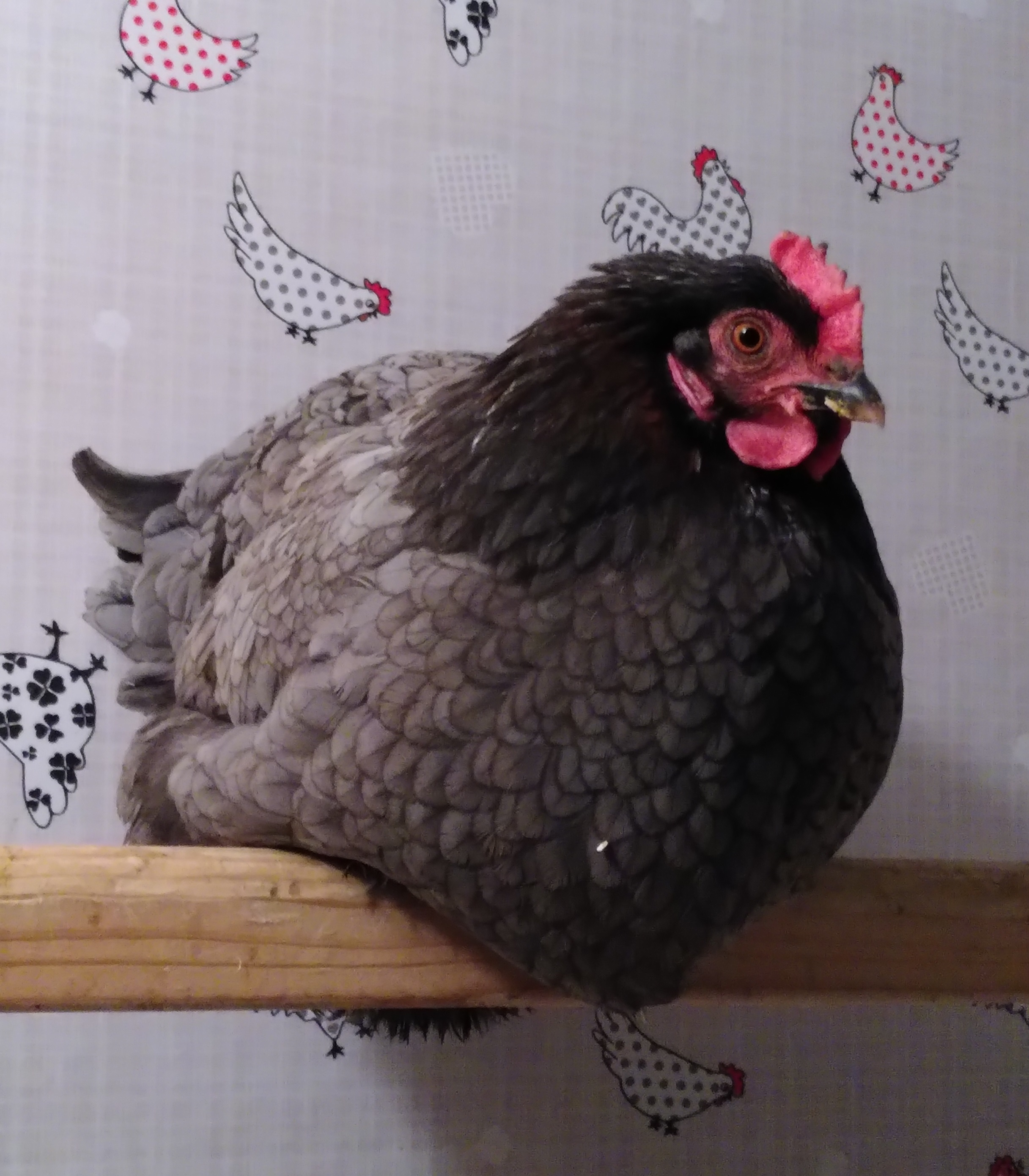
- Medium blue hen
- Country of origin: Sweden
- Use: eggs, meat

Traits
- Egg colour: blue, green
- Comb type: single
- Colour: blue; so also black and splashed white

Classification
- chicken; Gallus domesticus

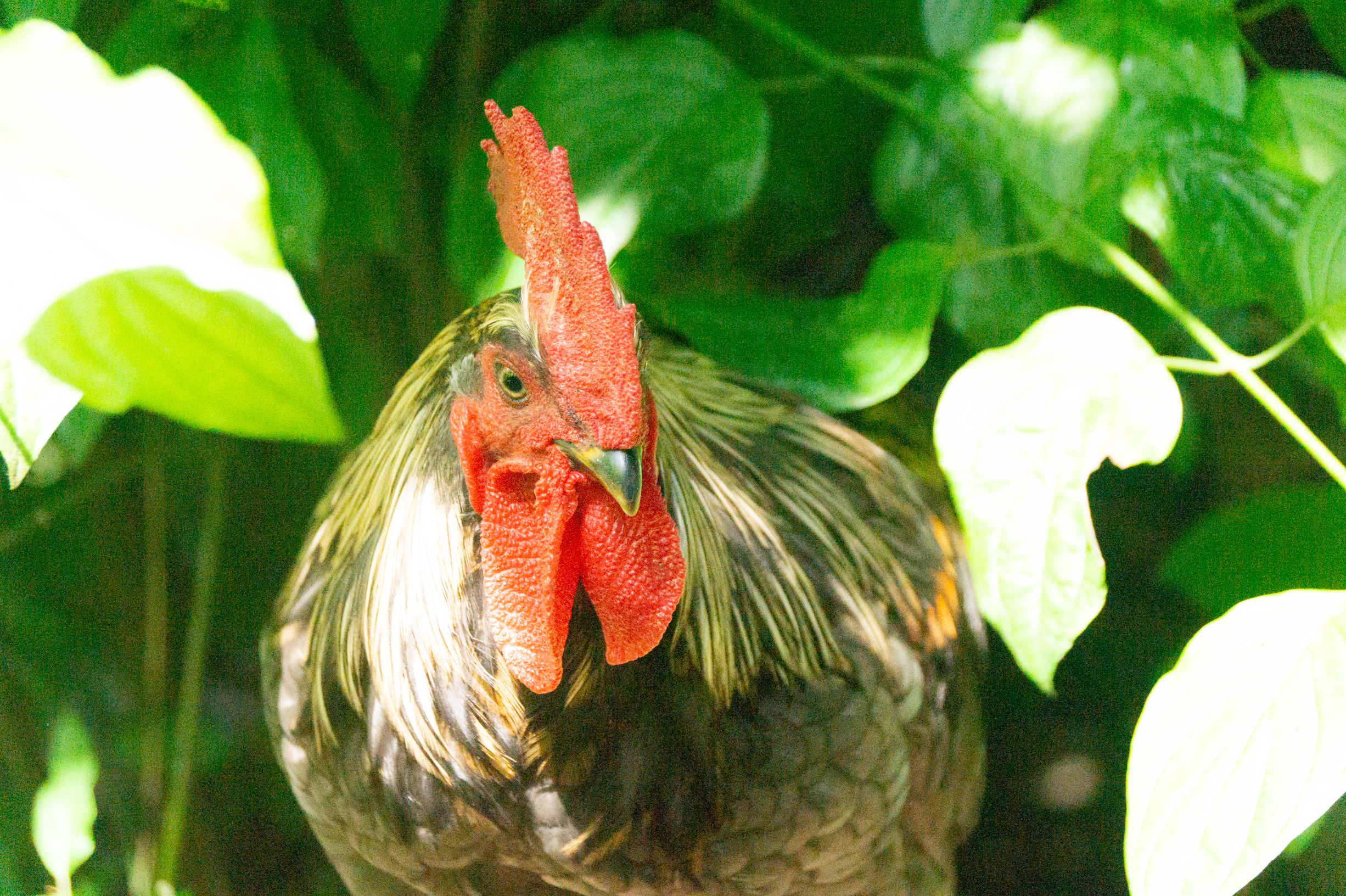
Cock bird, blue with gold neck hackles

The Silverudd Blue, Swedish: Silverudds Blå, is a Swedish breed of chicken. It was developed by Martin Silverudd in Småland, in southern Sweden. Hens lay blue/green eggs, weighing 50–65 grams. The flock-book for the breed is kept by the Svenska Kulturhönsföreningen – the Swedish Cultural Hen Association. It was initially known by various names including Isbar, Blue Isbar and Svensk Grönvärpare, or "Swedish green egg layer"; in 2016 it was renamed to 'Silverudd Blue' after its creator.

== History ==
The Silverudd Blue was developed by Martin Silverudd in Småland, in southern Sweden. It derived principally from imported New Hampshire and Rhode Island Red stock; the blue egg shell came from cross-breeding with Cream Legbar birds from the United Kingdom.

When Silverudd died in 1986, the development of the breed was incomplete, so modern examples vary in size, egg shell color, and body size. The breed was initially known by several names including Isbar, Blue Isbar and Svensk Grönvärpare, or "Swedish green egg layer"; in 2016 it was renamed to 'Silverudd Blue' after its creator.

== Characteristics ==
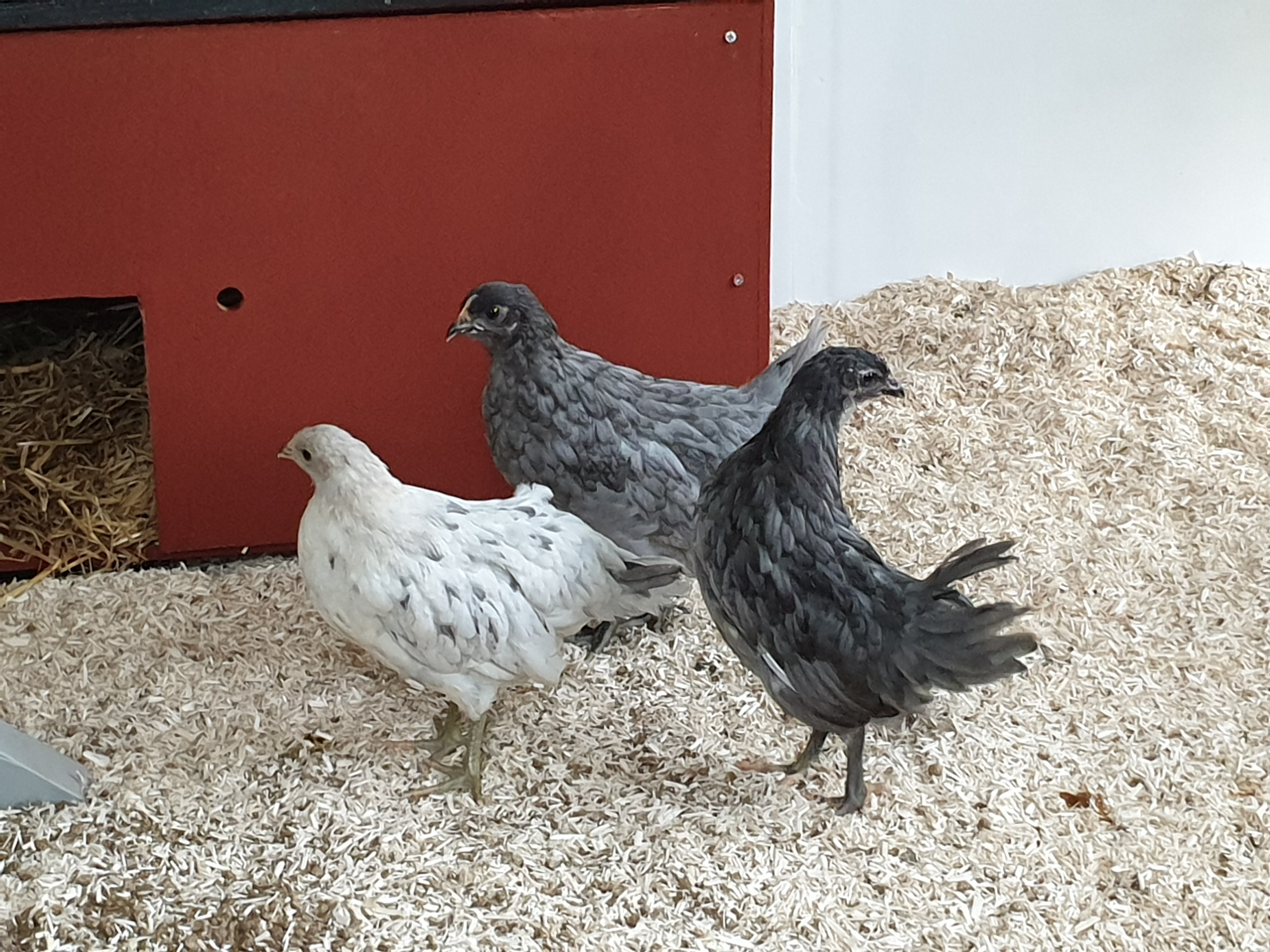
Pullets in the three possible colours

The Silverudd Blue is a medium-sized chicken. Hens weigh approximately 1.5 kg, and cock birds about 2.5 kg.

As in other blue chicken breeds, three colours occur in accordance with the frequency of the dilution gene: black, blue and splashed white, in Mendelian proportion (1:2:1). Black birds are born black with some lighter areas, blue birds are born grey, and splashed-white birds are born yellow.

The outline of the body is square. In cock birds the tail is arched, while in hens it is triangular and dense. The comb is single. The birds are four-toed, with dark legs tending towards black; the beak is dark.
