= Bielefelder Kennhuhn =

German breed of chicken

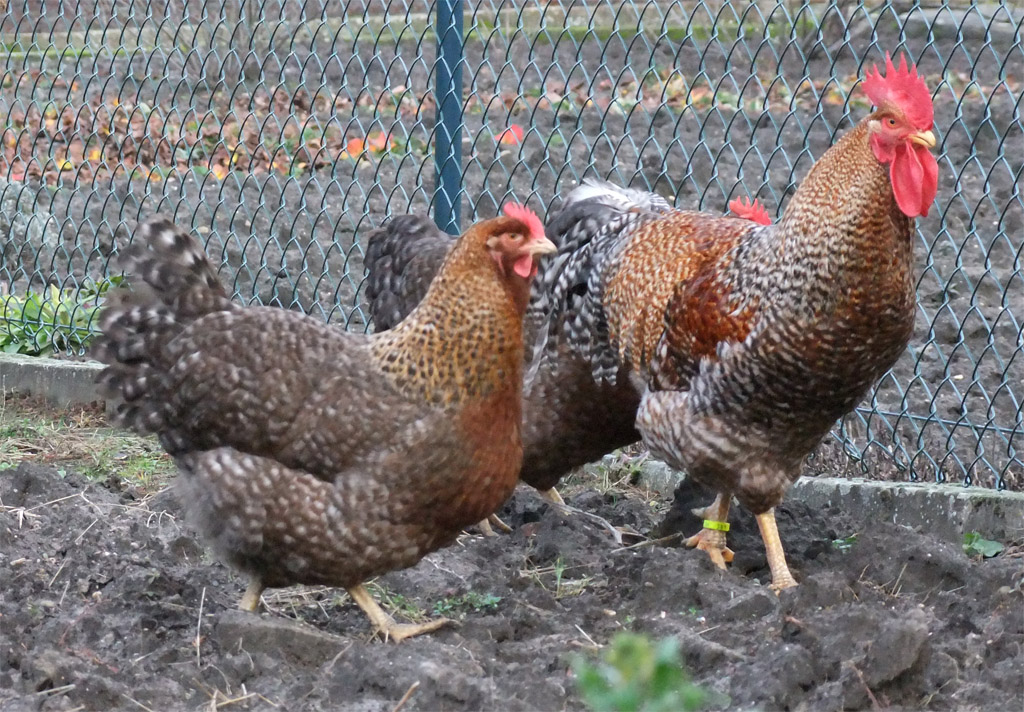
- Conservation status: FAO (2007): not at risk; DAD-IS (2021): not at risk
- Country of origin: Germany
- Use: dual-purpose, meat and eggs

Traits
- Weight: Male: standard: 3.0–4.0 kg; bantam: 1.3 kg; Female: standard: 2.50–3.25 kg; bantam: 1.1 kg
- Egg colour: brown

Classification
- APA: no
- EE: yes
- PCGB: no
- Chicken; Gallus gallus domesticus

The Bielefelder Kennhuhn (Note: German pronunciation: [ˈbiːləfɛldɐ ˈkɛnˌhuːn]) or Bielefelder is a German breed of domestic chicken. It was developed in the area of Bielefeld in the 1970s by Gerd Roth, who cross-bred birds of Malines and Welsumer stock with American Barred Rocks to create the breed. Like other breeds with Barred Rock parentage, it is auto-sexing – chicks of different sexes can be distinguished by their colour. There is a bantam version, the Bielefelder Zwerg-Kennhuhn.

== History ==
The concept of an auto-sexing chicken breed goes back to the work of Reginald Punnett in the 1920s and 1930s.

The Bielefelder Kennhuhn was developed in the 1970s in the area of Bielefeld, in Ostwestfalen-Lippe in the state of Nordrhein-Westfalen. It was created by Gerd Roth by cross-breeding of birds of Malines and Welsumer stock with American Barred Rock birds. It was first exhibited in 1976 as the Deutsche Kennhuhn; in 1980, when the breed was recognised by the Bund Deutscher Rassegeflügelzüchter, the name was changed to Bielefelder Kennhuhn.

In 2007 its conservation status was reported to the DAD-IS database of the Food and Agriculture Organization of the United Nations as "not at risk". It is not among the endangered chicken breeds listed by the Gesellschaft zur Erhaltung alter und gefährdeter Haustierrassen.

== Characteristics ==
The Bielefelder was initially bred in one colour only, crele (German kennsperber) – the cuckoo pattern with black-breasted red colouring. A silver variety (German silber-kennsperber) was later created; it shows the same patterning as in the crele variety, but without any red or yellow colouration. It is a new colour, not seen in any other breed.

Like other breeds with Barred Rock parentage, the Bielefelder is an auto-sexing breed – chicks of different sexes can be distinguished by their colour.

== Use ==
The Bielefelder is dual-purpose breed, well suited to extensive management. It is fast-growing and yields a good carcass. Hens may give about 230 large brown eggs per year, with an average weight of about 60 g.

Bantam hens may give about 160 eggs per year, with an average weight of 49 g.

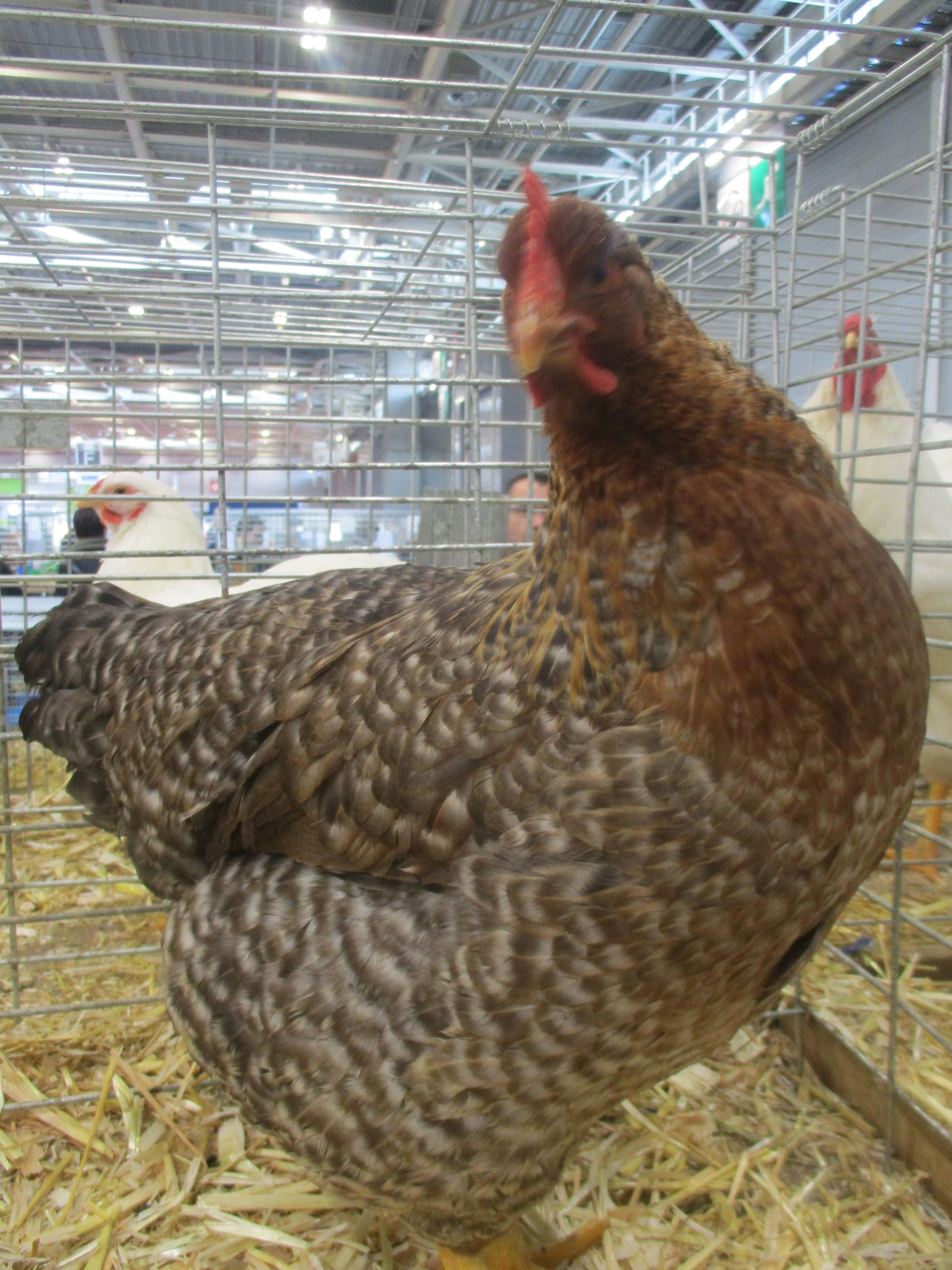
Hen

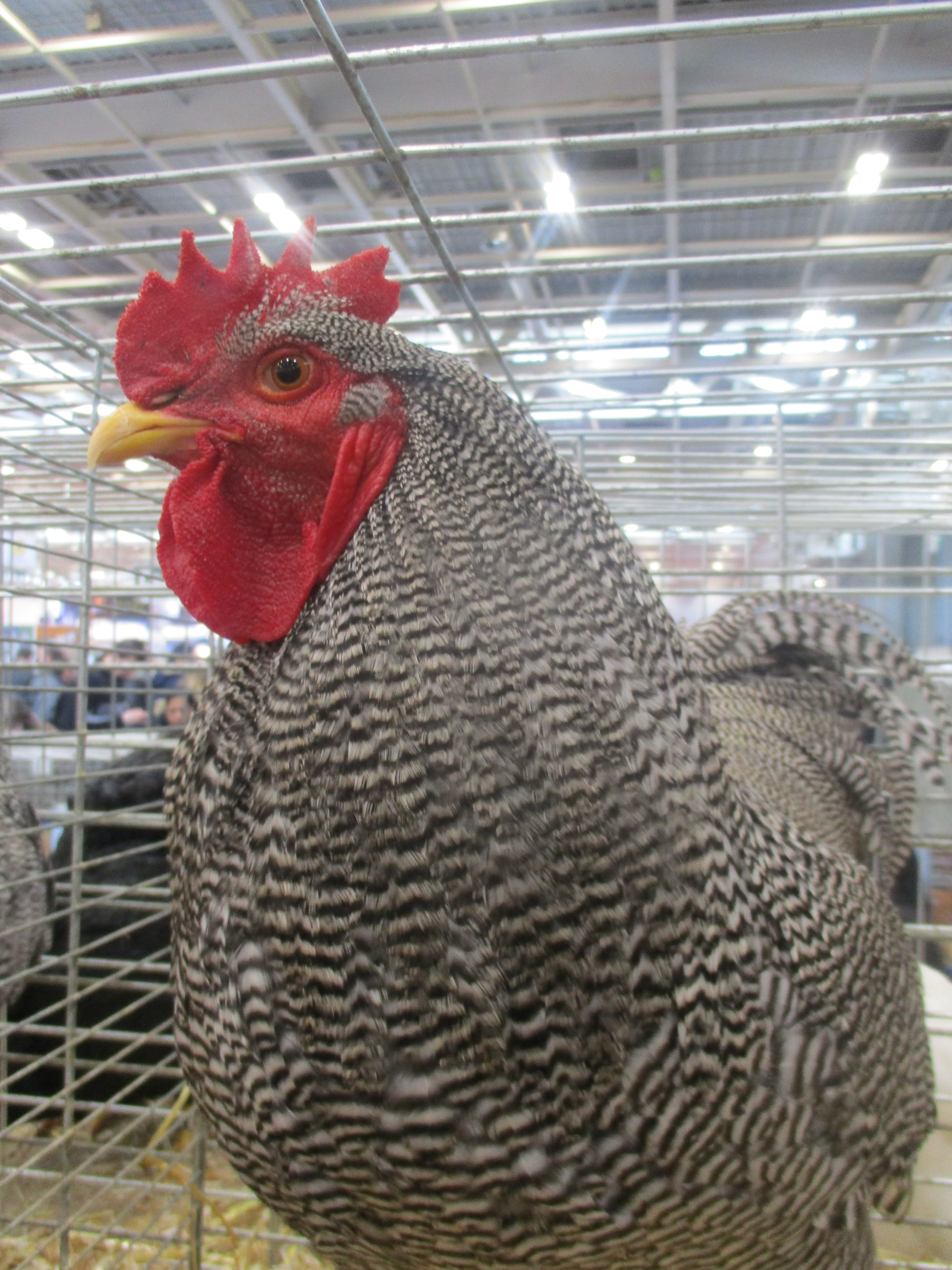
Cock

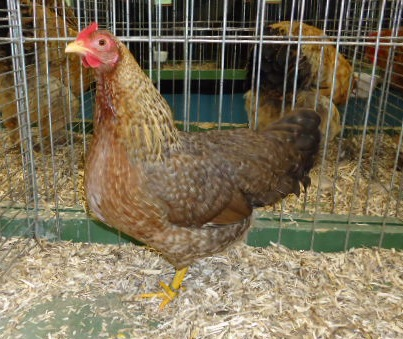
Bantam hen

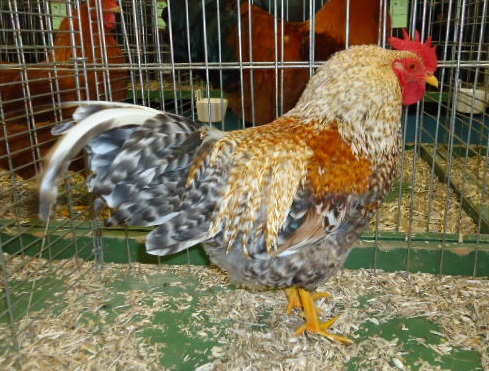
Bantam cock
