= Jærhøns =

Breed of chicken

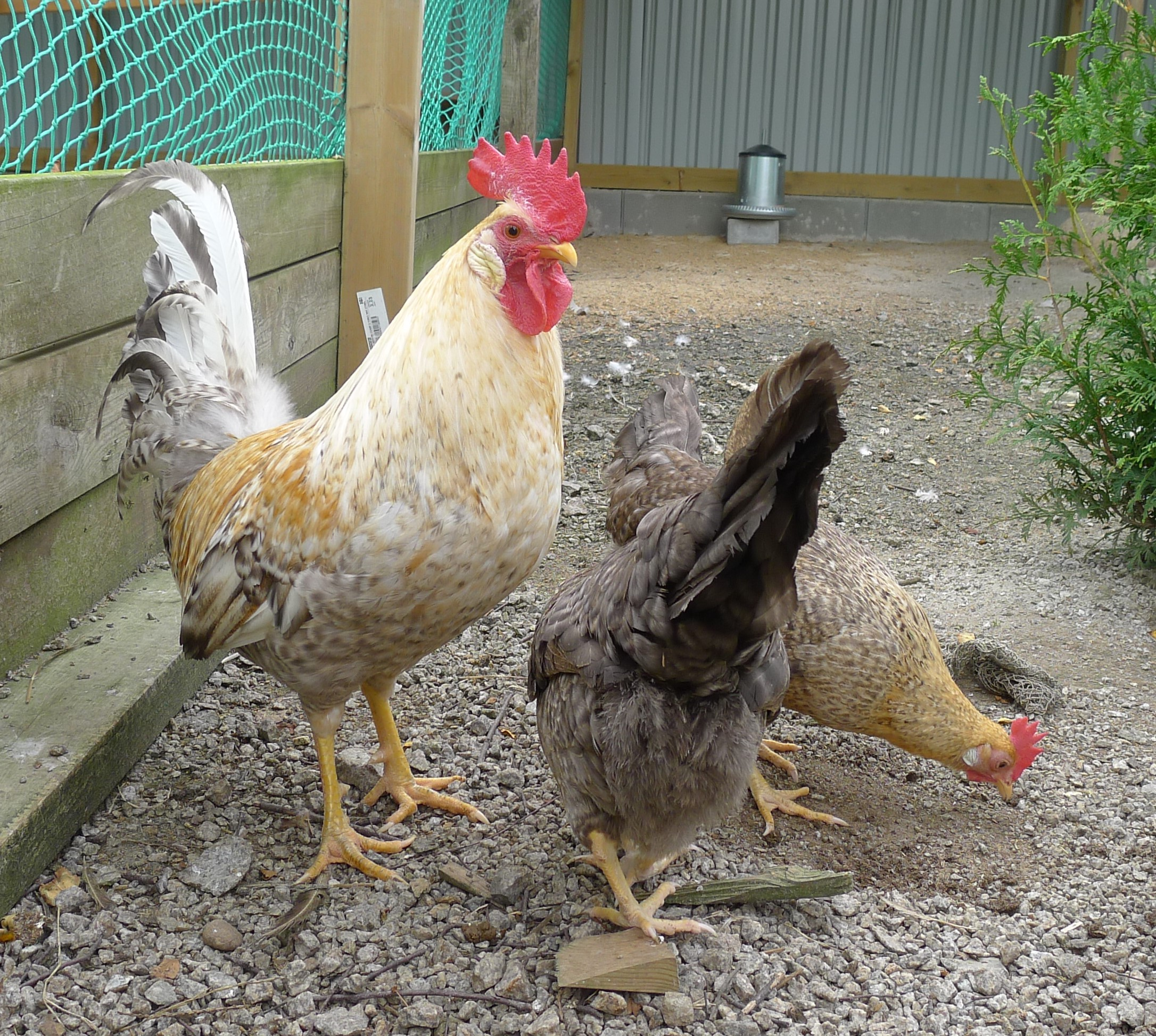
- Conservation status: FAO (2007): not at risk
- Other names: Norwegian: Norske Jærhøns
- Country of origin: Norway

Traits
- Weight: Male: about 1.7 kg; Female: about 1.7 kg
- Egg colour: white
- Comb type: simple

Classification
- APA: no
- EE: yes
- PCGB: no
- Chicken; Gallus gallus domesticus

The Jærhøns or Norske Jærhøns is the only indigenous breed of domestic chicken in Norway. It is named for the traditional district of Jæren in the county of Rogaland.

== History ==
The Jærhøns was the principal chicken breed of Norway until imports of foreign breeds began in the nineteenth century. The Jærhøns was selectively bred at the state-controlled breeding station at Bryne in Jæren from its establishment in 1916 until it closed in 1973. Breeding stock was then transferred to the state agricultural college at Hvam, Nes. Following work done in the first half of the twentieth century, the Jærhøns is auto-sexing.

The Jærhøns was listed as a "conservation-worthy national breed" by the Norwegian Forest and Landscape Institute in its 2008–2010 action plan for the conservation and sustainable use of animal genetic resources in Norway.

== Characteristics ==
Two colour varieties are recognised for the Jærhøns, dark brown and yellow, and light brown and yellow. The comb is single, and the beak and legs are bright yellow.

A bantam Jærhøns with the same two colour varieties was approved in 1994.

== Use ==
The Jærhøns lays approximately 215 eggs per year, about 20% less than industrial purpose-bred layers. The eggs are white, and weigh a minimum of 55 g.
