= Campine chicken =

Breed of chicken

Campine
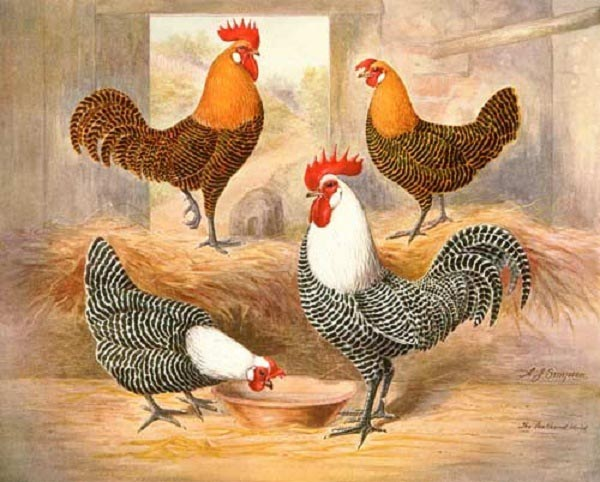
- Silver and Gold varieties of the Campine
- Conservation status: RBST (UK): at risk
- Country of origin: Belgium
- Use: eggs, show

Traits
- Weight: Male: Standard: 2.7 kg Bantam: 680 g; Female: Standard: 2.3 kg Bantam: 570 g
- Egg color: white
- Comb type: single

Classification
- APA: continental
- ABA: single comb clean legged
- PCGB: rare soft feather: light
- Chicken; Gallus gallus domesticus

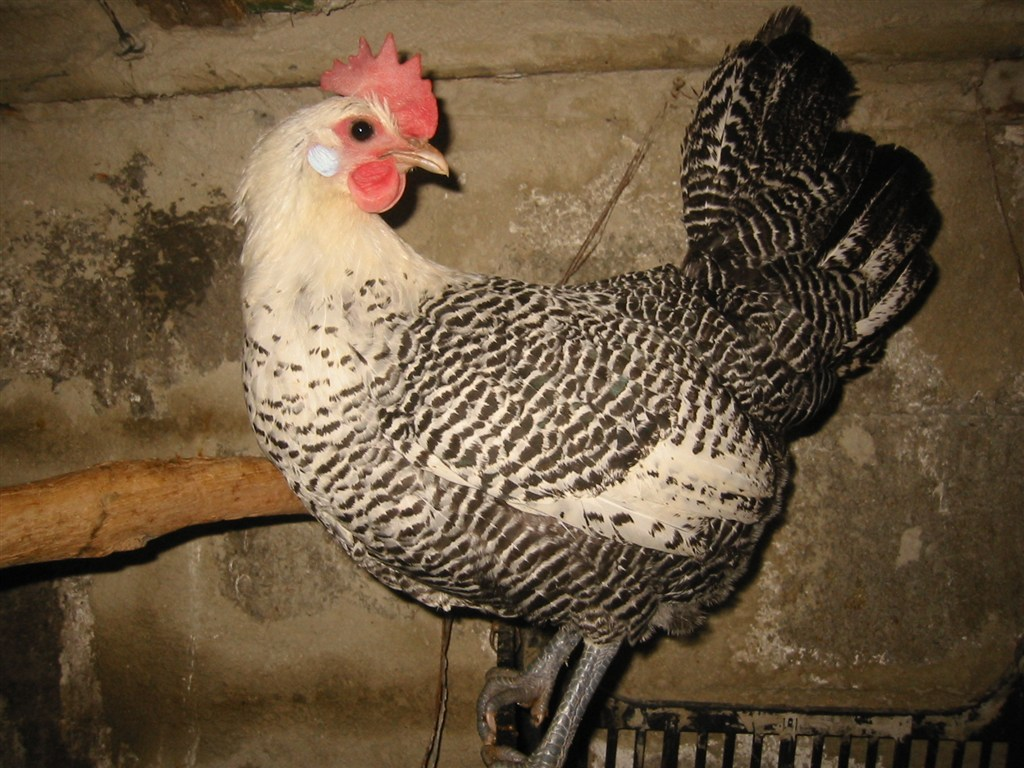
A silver Campine hen

The Campine (French pronunciation: [kɑ̃pin]) is a breed of domestic chicken originating in the northern part of Belgium. It is named for the Campine region of north-eastern Belgium and south-eastern Netherlands. It was known there as the Kempisch Hoen (Dutch pronunciation: [ˈkɛmpis ˈɦun]).

== History ==
The Campine was originally a smaller type of the Braekel, weighing up to 1.2 kg less. It was distributed throughout the province of Antwerp and in the northern and central part of the province of Limburg. It was decided in 1884 that the two types should be separated. After a long controversy, the Campine became a separate breed with its own breed standard on 28 August 1904. After further controversy, the two breeds were reunited under a single standard in 1925 or 1926, with the name Kempisch-Braekel. In 1962 it was decided that the Campine type had entirely disappeared, and the name of the Belgian breed was changed to Brakelhoen.

The Campine was imported to England in about 1899, and was bred there to become a very different bird. In particular, hen feathering in cocks became standard. Hen-feathered Braekel cocks had been bred by Oscar Thomaes of Ronse, Belgium, in 1904, and a cock hatched from one of his eggs took first place at a show at the Alexandra Palace in London in that year.

Birds were exported from Britain to the United States. A Campines cock took first prizes at Madison Square Garden, New York City, and in Boston in January 1913. The Campines was added to the Standard of Perfection of the American Poultry Association in 1914.

In the teens and early 1920s, the Silver Campine was raised for eggs with some commercial success by U.S. poultry producers such as Homestead Campine Farm of Wayland, MA.

== Characteristics ==
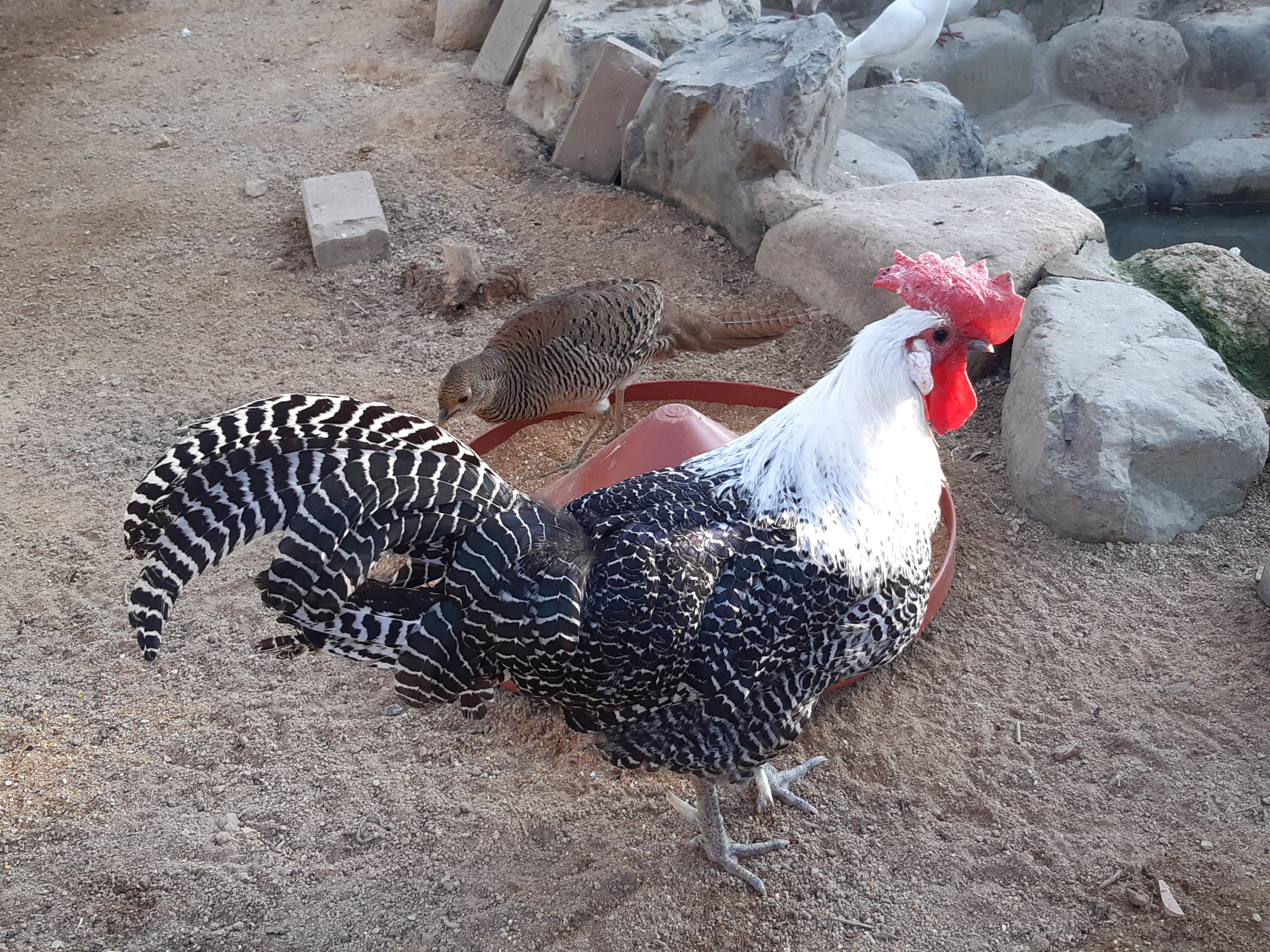
A silver Campine cock

There are two colour varieties of the Campine, Silver and Gold. Both sexes have the same colour pattern: the Silver has a pure white head and neck hackles, the rest of the bird being barred with black with beetle-green sheen, on a pure white ground; the Golden variety has the same pattern, but the head, neck hackles and body ground colour is rich gold rather than white.

In its country of origin, the Campine had a reputation as an "every day layer", a reliable producer of large white eggs.

Campines are considered to be a flighty, hardy breed with an active and inquisitive nature. They are among the rarest of domestic chicken breeds.

== Use ==
The Campine lays a fair number of white-shelled eggs, but is kept mostly for showing today.

== Genetic research ==
The Golden Campine was used in early research into auto-sexing in chickens by Reginald Crundall Punnett and Michael Pease at the Genetical Institute in Cambridge. The Cambar, the first auto-sexing hybrid, created in 1929, was a cross between the Golden Campine and the Barred Rock.

The hen-feathering trait in cocks of the Golden Campine has been found to be identical to that in the Sebright, a bantam breed. It has been suggested that it is the same gene, and that the trait in the Campine derives from the Sebright.

The Campine is closely related to the Dutch Chaamse Hoen. Although the Campine also has a degree of resemblance to the Egyptian Fayoumi, in plumage and in behavior, no genetic studies have been done linking the two breeds.
