= Auto-sexing =

Type of poultry breed

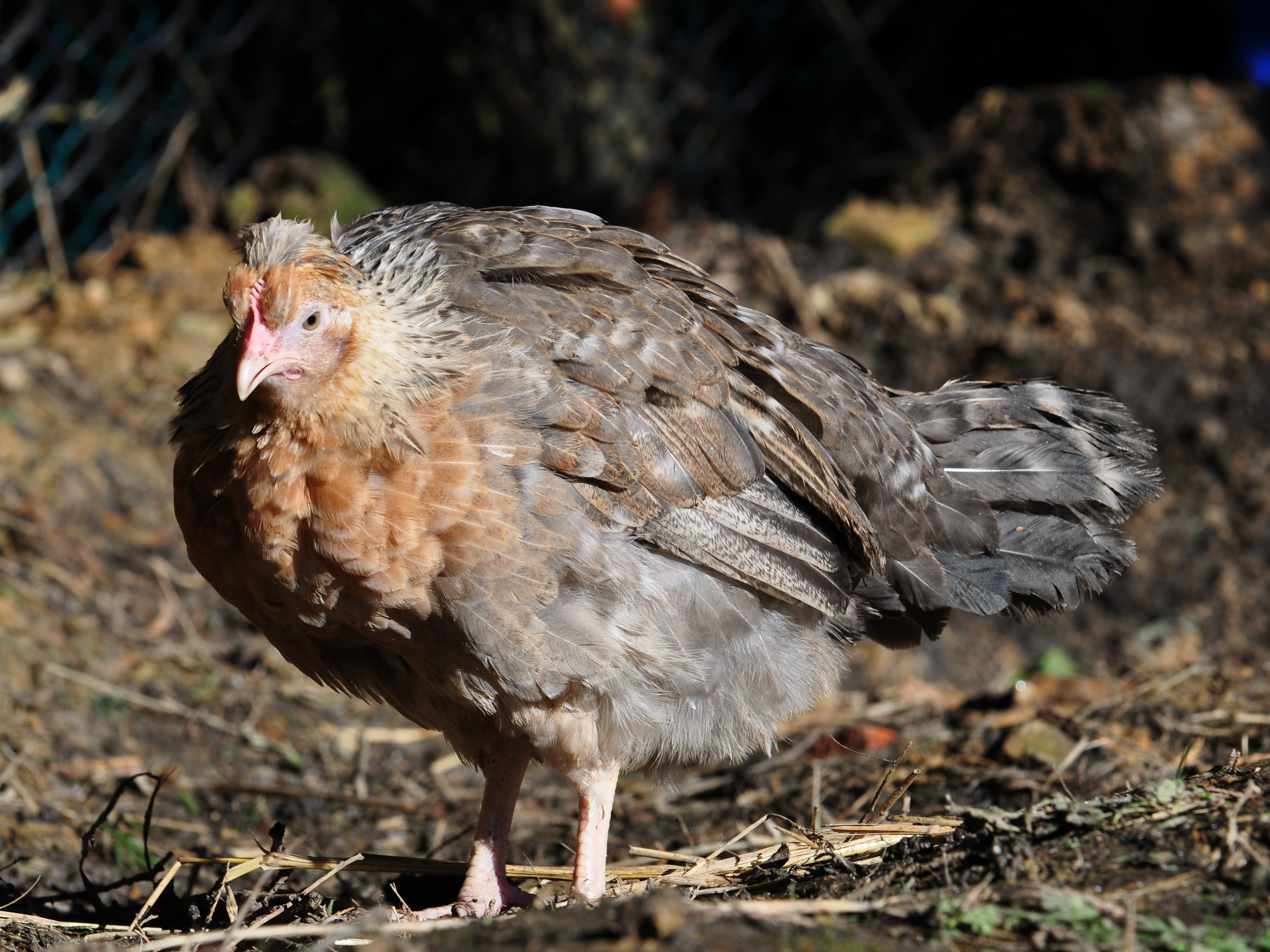
The Cream Legbar, an auto-sexing breed

Auto-sexing breeds of poultry are those in which the sex of newly-hatched chicks can be determined from the colour and markings of the down. Some breeds of chicken, of goose and of domestic pigeon have this characteristic. The idea of such a breed is due to Reginald Punnett, who created the first auto-sexing chicken breed, the Cambar, at the Genetical Institute in Cambridge in 1928.

== Mechanism ==
Unlike sex-linked hybrids, such as 'red sex-links' or 'black sex-links', the Legbar is an auto-sexing breed. Several other auto-sexing breeds or auto-sexing varieties of breeds exist, such as Plymouth Rock, Bielefelder Kennhuhn, Niederrheiner, and Norwegian Jærhøns. Most breeds that end with -bar, such as Welbar, Rhodebar, Brussbar or Wybar, are auto-sexing as well.

The importance that auto-sexing plays in the Legbar breed is also reflected in the fact that, next to a standards for the adult birds, the down colour and patterns are also standardised. Day-old male chicks can be distinguished from day-old female chicks by the down colour and the pattern they form. Female Legbar chicks in general have a broad very dark brown stripe extending over the head, neck and rump and a clear eye barring. The edges of the stripe are clearly defined and should not be blurred and blending with the ground colour, which is dark brown. A light head spot should be visible but is usually small. The male Legbar chicks in contrast have a much paler down shade and the pattern is blurred and washed out from head to rump.

The marked difference between male and female chicks is due to gene dosage of the sex-linked barring gene ('barring' (B), 'nonbarring' (b+)). This gene is located on the Z-Chromosome of birds. Birds have different sex-chromosomes (Z and w) and a different sex-determination system compared to mammals (X and Y). Male birds have therefore two Z-chromosomes while female birds have a Z- and a dwarfed w-chromosome. This means that phenotypically barred cocks can either have the B/B or the B/b+ genotype, while a barred hen always has to have a B/- genotype. The colour-sexing of Legbar chicks, however, is only possible because the male chicks have a double dose of the sex-linked barring gene (genotype B/B), while the female chicks only have a single dose (genotype B/-), resulting in the observed down colours.

== Chickens ==
The concept of an auto-sexing breed of chicken is due to the geneticist Reginald Punnett, who during the First World War had already proposed the technique of cross-breeding chickens carrying the barred gene (B) with others to produce sex-linked chicks with plumage differences that could easily be distinguished.

Working at the Genetical Institute of Cambridge University, he and Michael Pease cross-bred Golden Campines with barred Plymouth Rocks, resulting in the creation of the Cambar in 1928. About ten years later they produced the Legbar by crossing brown Leghorns with barred Plymouth Rocks.

Other "Cambridge" breeds later developed were:

- the Brockbar, created in 1940 from buff and barred Plymouth Rocks, became extinct by about 1950
- the Brussbar, created in 1952 from light Sussex, brown Sussex and barred Plymouth Rocks
- the Dorbar, an auto-sexing heavy meat breed from Dorkings and barred Plymouth Rocks, bred from 1941 to about 1949, when development stopped
- the Rhodebar, from Rhode Island Reds and barred Plymouth Rocks, standardised in Britain in 1951; a similar cross-breed was developed in Canada
- the Welbar, not created at Cambridge but by a Devon breeder, from Welsumer and barred Plymouth Rocks; and
- the Wybar, also not created at Cambridge but by an individual breeder, from Wyandotte, Brussbar and barred Plymouth Rocks.

Many other breeds were created in the same way, all making use of barred Plymouth Rocks to impart the barred gene:

- The American California Grey was bred in the 1930s in Modesto, California.
- In about 1936 Arend L. Hagedoorn introduced the barred gene to Barnevelders and to brown Leghorns.
- In 1940 R. George Jaap produced the Oklabar by crossing dark Cornish with barred Plymouth Rocks.
- By 1941 the Ancobar had been bred from mottled Anconas and barred Plymouth Rocks, by W. F. Lamoreux at Cornell University in Ithaca, New York.
- The Polbar was created between 1946 and 1954 by Laura Kaufman, who crossed the native Polish Green-legged Partridge breed with barred Plymouth Rocks.
- The German Bielefelder Kennhuhn, developed in the 1970s in the area of Bielefeld in Nordrhein-Westfalen from Malines, Welsumer and barred Plymouth Rocks.

== Geese ==
Auto-sexing in geese functions in a different way: the adult gander and goose are immediately distinguishable because they are of different colours. Among the breeds that display this characteristic are:

- the Cotton Patch of the United States
- the Oie Normande of France
- the Pilgrim Goose of the United Kingdom and the United States, known in Australia as the Settler
- the Shetland Goose of the United Kingdom and the United States
- the West of England of the United Kingdom.
