= R. Fabian Pease =

Engineer and professor (born 1936)

- Born: 24 October 1936 (age 89); Cambridge, England
- Other names: Roger Fabian W. Pease; R. Fabian W. Pease; R. F. Pease; Fabian Pease
- Relatives: Pease family

Academic background
- Education: Bedales School; University of Cambridge (BA, MA, PhD)

Academic work
- Discipline: Engineer
- Sub-discipline: Electrical engineering; Engineering education; Miniaturization; Scanning electron microscopy
- Institutions: Stanford University

Roger Fabian Wedgwood Pease (born 24 October 1936) is an engineer and William E. Ayer Professor of Electrical Engineering, Emeritus at Stanford University. He is also an emeritus member of the National Academy of Engineering and Fellow of the IEEE. His research includes work in the fields of micro- and nanofabrication, nanostructures, and miniaturization.

== Early life and education ==
Pease was born in Cambridge, the youngest of 6 children of Helen Bowen Wedgwood and Michael Stewart Pease, making him a member of both the Pease and Wedgwood families. He attended Bedales School; after completing schooling, he joined the Royal Air Force in 1955, serving two years and becoming a radar officer. He received a Bachelor of Arts in 1960 from Trinity College, Cambridge, where he later received Master of Arts and Doctor of Philosophy degrees in 1964; that year, he moved to the United States.

Pease's Ph.D. was on improving the scanning electron microscope to resolutions below 10 nm.

== Career ==
Pease worked as an assistant professor at University of California, Berkeley from 1964 to 1967, after which he worked at Bell Labs. In 1978, he became a professor of electrical engineering at Stanford University, where he held the William Ayer Professorship. In 2009, he retired and was made emeritus. The Pease-Ye professorship at Stanford was named in his honor on its endowment.

Pease is credited as the co-inventor of microchannel cooling for chip stacks.
