= Welsummer =

Breed of chicken

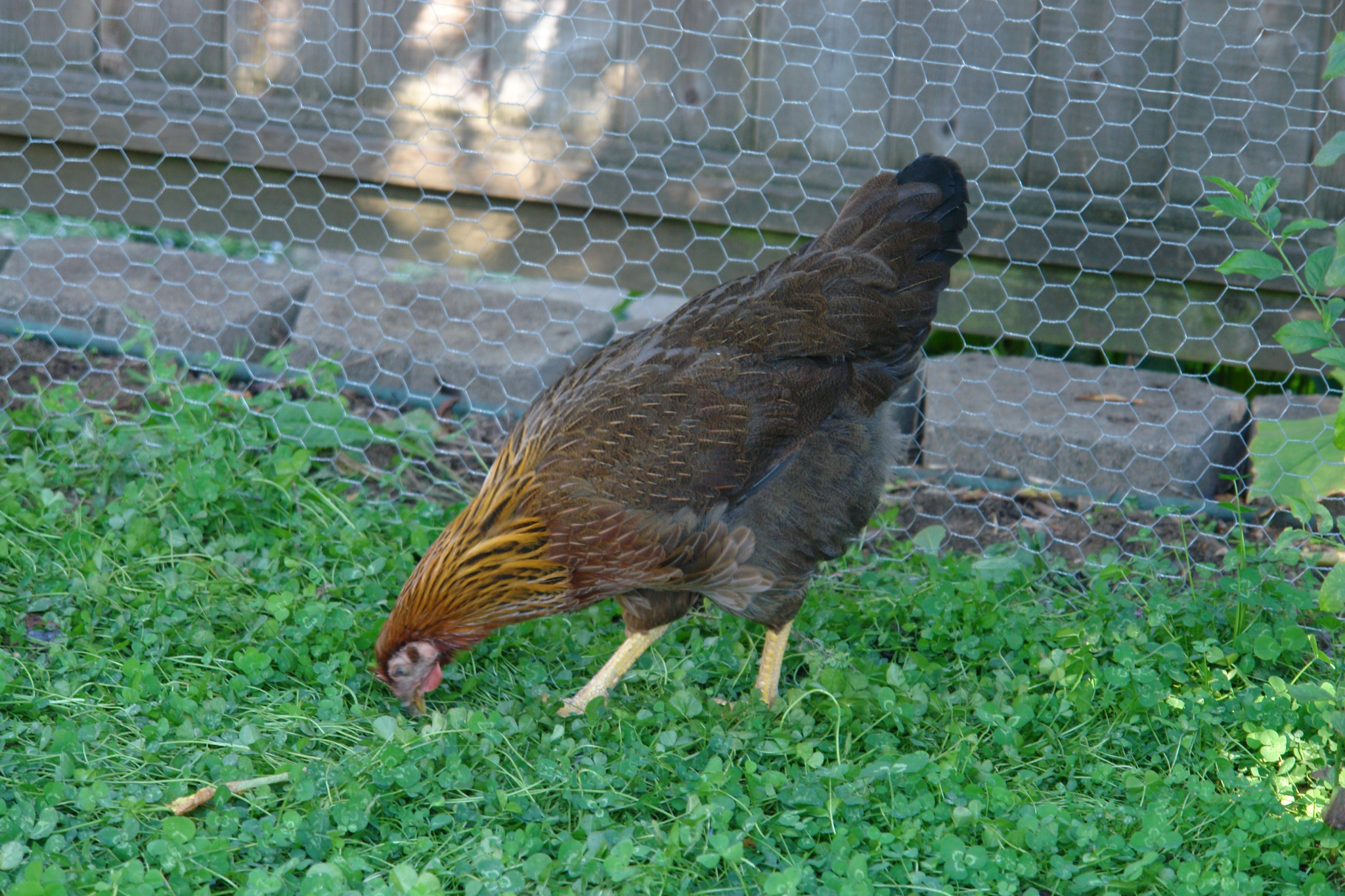
- A Welsummer hen
- Other names: Welsumer
- Country of origin: Netherlands
- Use: dual-purpose

Traits
- Weight: Male: Standard: 2.75–3.25 kg Bantam: to 1300 g; Female: Standard: 2.0–2.5 kg Bantam: to 1000 g
- Skin colour: cream
- Egg colour: dark brown
- Comb type: single

Classification
- APA: continental
- ABA: single comb, clean-legged
- EE: yes
- PCGB: soft feather: light
- Chicken; Gallus gallus domesticus

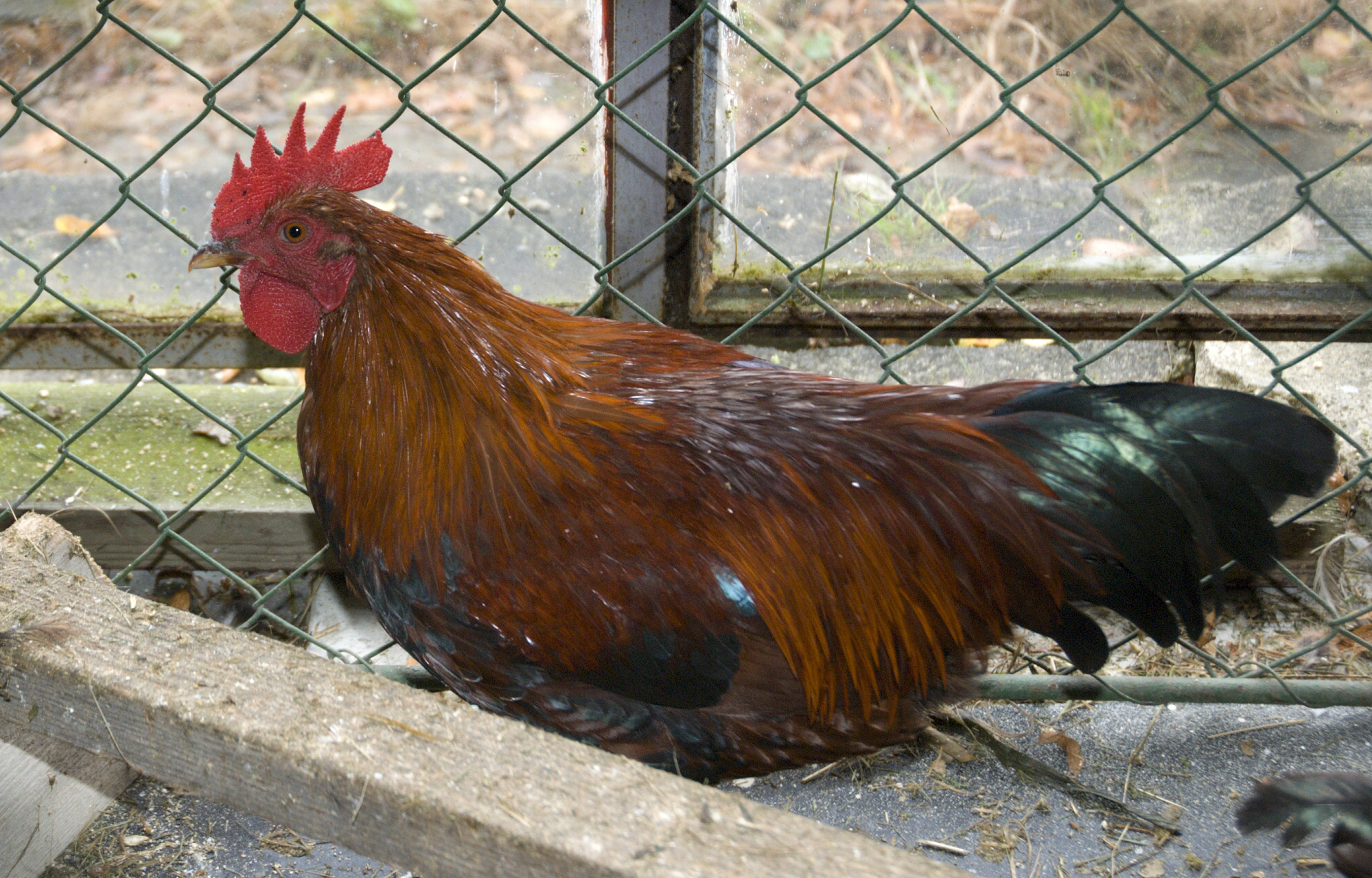
Bantam cockerel

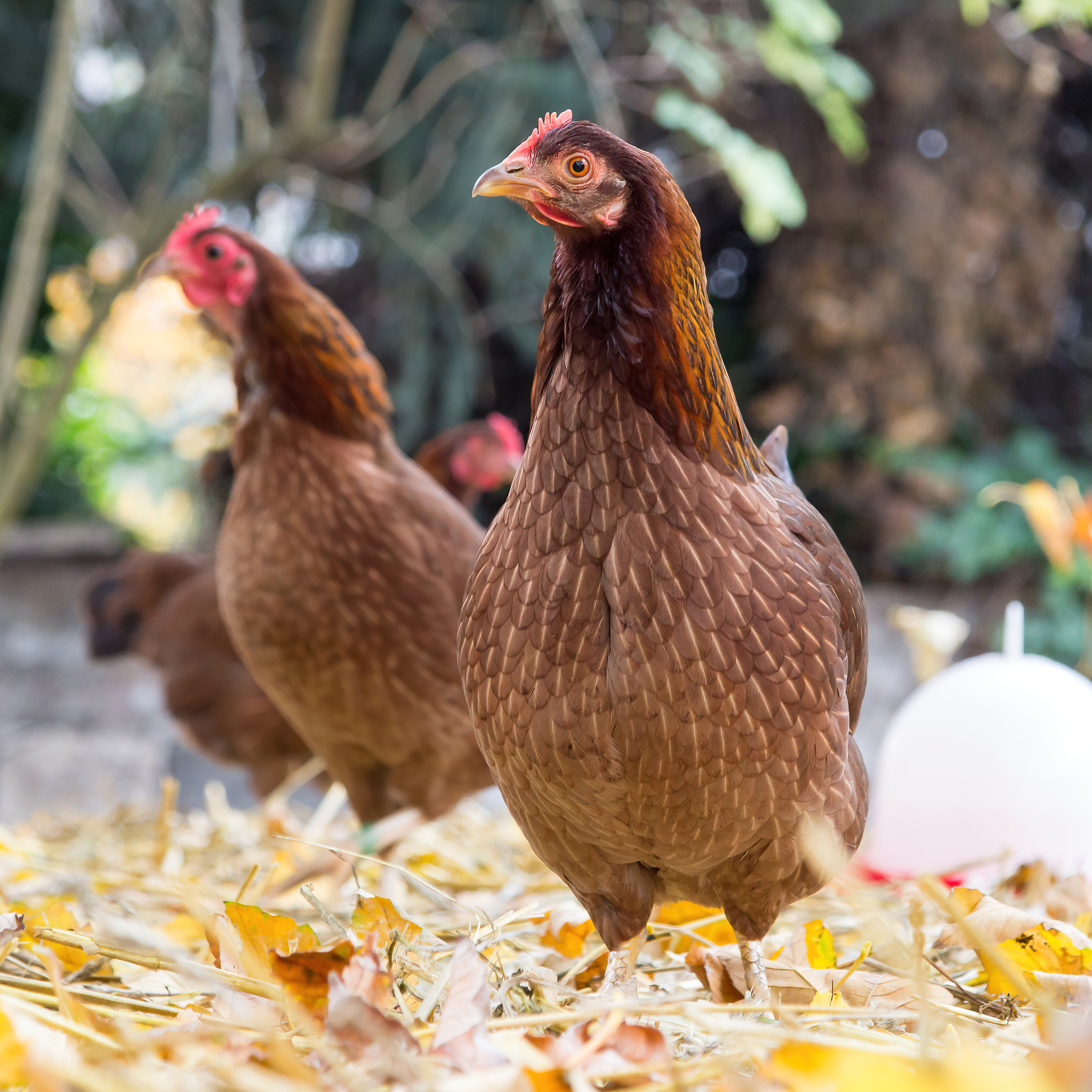
Bantam hen

The Welsummer or Welsumer is a Dutch breed of domestic chicken. It originates in the small village of Welsum, in the eastern Netherlands. It was bred at the beginning of the twentieth century from local fowls of mixed origin: Rhode Island Reds, Barnevelders, Partridge Leghorns, Cochins, and Wyandottes. In 1922–23, steps were taken to fix a standard after the birds began to show a good deal of uniformity. The eggs were originally exported for the commercial egg trade. Some stock was exported to the United Kingdom, and the breed was added to the British Standard in 1930.

In 2001, a number of farms culled their flocks in connection with the outbreak of foot-and-mouth disease.

== Characteristics ==
Three plumage colours are listed for the Welsumer by the Entente Européenne d’Aviculture et de Cuniculture, of which only one, Red Partridge, is recognised in the Netherlands.

The Welsummer is a true utility bird, being a great layer as well as great eating. They are very hardy birds often surviving illness and hard winters and are known to live 8-10 years. Due to this the Welsummer was chosen to accompany The First Fleet to Sydney Cove Australia in 1788. Evolving from the Asian Red Jungle fowl, Wellsummers are an autosexing breed. Autosexing chicken breeds are purebreds where male and female chicks have distinct color/pattern differences at hatch, allowing for easy sexing without vent sexing. In terms of the Welsummer, day old females appear with a dark line from their eye to the back of their head. Males possess a light brown head and back with an absence of that dark eye line.

== Use ==
Welsumer hens lay about 160 eggs per year; the eggs are dark brown and weigh about 65 grams. Bantam Welsumers lay about 180 dark brown eggs per year, with an average weight of 47 g.
