= Michael Pease =

British geneticist

Michael Stewart Pease OBE (2 October 1890 – 27 July 1966) was a British classical geneticist at Cambridge University.

Michael Pease was the son of Edward R. Pease of the Pease family, a writer and a founding member of the Fabian Society. Michael was educated at Bedales School and Trinity College, Cambridge, where he was elected chairman of the Cambridge University Fabian Society. On 24 February 1920 he married Helen Bowen Wedgwood, daughter of the Labour politician Josiah Wedgwood IV of the Wedgwood pottery family at Chelsea Register Office. Their children include the physicist Bas Pease and R. Fabian Pease.

He worked at the Genetical Institute of Cambridge as assistant to Reginald Punnett, who created the first auto-sexing chicken breeds, the Cambar and Legbar, in which the sex of day-old chicks was clearly distinguishable from the plumage. When, in 1930, a separate poultry research facility was established, Pease headed it. He also served as a Labour councillor on the Cambridge County Council for Girton. He was appointed to be an Ordinary Officers of the Civil Division of the Order of the British Empire in 1966 for political and public services in Cambridgeshire.

He was held in the civilian internment camp at Ruhleben, near Berlin, during the First World War. His mother, Marjory Pease, asked whether he could be exchanged for a German prisoner wishing to return to Berlin, but without success. While interned Pease tried to get gardens put into the camp and on 27 April 1916 gave a lecture on dancing in Elizabethan times.
