= Golden Comet =

Commercial crossbreed chicken

- Other names: Red Sex Link; Gold Sex Link
- Nicknames: Cinnamon Queen; Golden Buff
- Country of origin: United States
- Use: eggs

Traits
- Weight: Male: 2.72 kg (6.0 lb); Female: 1.81 kg (4.0 lb)
- Skin color: yellow
- Egg color: brown
- Comb type: single

Classification

Notes
- Level of care: Suitable for beginners
- Chicken; Gallus gallus domesticus

Golden Comet is a chicken breed that is cross bred and sex linked: developed by crossing a female White Rock or Rhode Island White and a male New Hampshire Red chicken.

== Overview ==
They can be considered as one of the most successful sex linked chickens, and is arguably one of the most widely kept hybrid hen in the USA. The Hubbard firm was the originator of the Golden Comet Chicken breed. Its other names include Golden Buff, Red Star, Gold Sex-Link and Cinnamon Queen.

It is not officially recognized as a breed of chicken by the American Poultry Association because it is a crossbreed.

== Commercial production ==
It is favored for its egg production. As Golden Comet roosters are not favoured for egg production, any male chicks that hatch are not preserved. They are ideal for small-scale agriculture. They can lay up to 6 eggs per week on average, that is 330 eggs on average, per annum. They can start producing eggs when they are 16 weeks old. Golden Comet hens are productive until they reach the age of approximately two years. Beyond that point, their egg production gradually declines, and by around the third year, egg laying may cease, sometimes even earlier. Therefore they have a short production lifespan. The Golden Comet chickens are frequently adopted by the public as rescue hens once they have completed their initial two years in commercial production. Younger pullets initially lay slightly smaller eggs, but the eggs tend to increase in size over the next few weeks as they mature. Female Golden comets do not usually exhibit signs of broodiness, that is the urge to sit on their eggs till it hatches. To produce Golden Comets, you will need a New Hampshire rooster and a White Rock hen, rather than attempting to pair two Golden Comets. Alternatively, they can easily be acquired from hatcheries.

It rivals the Rhode Island Red due to their similar production value.

== Physicality ==
Their bodies form an inverted U-shape, and the hens carry their tail feathers high. The golden comet's plumage tends to lean more towards reddish-brown hue, although some individuals may display slightly lighter feathers or gold-colored hue. Others might exhibit honey-toned feathers or have white patches amidst the red. Their combs, earlobes, and wattles are all a vibrant shade of upright red. With orange eyes and bone-colored or yellow beaks, golden comets are further characterized by unfeathered legs that reveal yellow skin and four toes on each foot. When they are chicks, the females exhibit stripe-like patterns on their backs similar to chipmunks and generally have darker down feathers.

They have a laid-back, relaxed, and amiable temperament.

They are sex linked, that means that the sex of a chick is discernible from birth as both male and females have distinct physical attributes, e.g color. Distinguishing between female and male Golden comets is based on their coloration. Females are characterized by a golden buff color with stripes, while males display a pale yellow hue. This coloration fades off as they become adults, with some white feathers showing at the back of their neck.

They have an average lifespan of 4 to 5 years.

Their combs are susceptible to frostbite. After reaching three years of age, they become increasingly vulnerable to reproductive organ problems, including conditions like peritonitis and tumors, primarily because of the significant strain placed on these body parts.

== Breeding conditions ==
Golden Comets are adaptable to different climates, thriving in both hot and cold weather. They require warm nesting material, like hay or straw, in cold conditions. In terms of heat tolerance, they are more resilient than some larger chickens, however, they still require shade and ample water to manage the heat effectively. These chickens can tolerate various living conditions, provided they have enough space, ideally three to four square feet per bird. They also excel at free-ranging, showcasing their foraging skills and supplementing their diets with insects. For a harmonious mix, breeds such as Cochins, Plymouth Rocks, Faverolles, or Orpington are excellent choices.
