= Sex-link =

Crossbred chickens

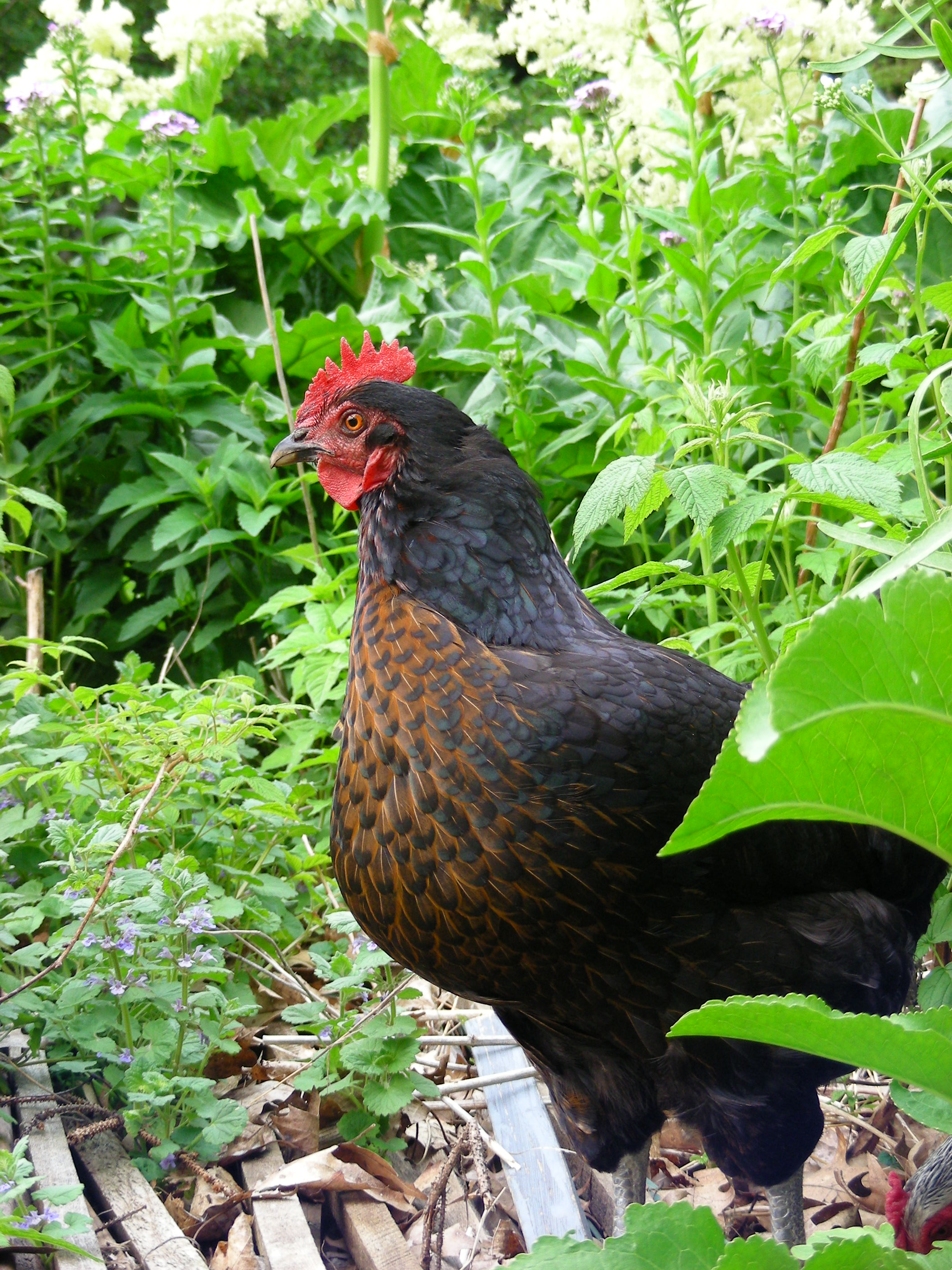
A black sex-link hen

Sex-links are crossbred chickens whose color at hatching is differentiated by sex, thus making chick sexing an easier process. Sex-links come in several varieties. As hybrids of laying or dual-purpose breeds infused with extra vigor via heterosis, sex-links can be extremely good egg-layers which often produce 300 eggs a year or more depending on the quality of care and feed. The color of their eggs vary according to the mix of breeds, and blue-green eggs are possible.

Chicks of a single breed that are similarly sex-linked are called autosex chickens, a term developed to differentiate between sex linkage in purebred chickens versus sex linkage in crossbreeds.

== Sex-link types ==
Many common varieties are known as the black sex-link (also called black stars) and the red sex-link (also called red stars). More specific variety names are common as well.

- Black sex-link like "Black rocks" are a cross between unique specially bred hybrid strains of Rhode Island Red cock (but any non-white and non barred rooster may be used for other black sex-link crosses) and a Barred Rock hen (which carry both extended black and barring genes).
- Red sex-links are a cross between a Rhode Island Red or New Hampshire cock and a White Rock (This variety pair is known as a Golden Comet), Silver Laced Wyandotte, Rhode Island White, or Delaware hen.

Examples of a red-linked breeds include the Red Shaver and ISA Brown sex-links which are found in Canada.

White birds should not be used in sex-linked crosses because white colour allele is sometimes dominant and sometimes recessive.

== Gallery ==
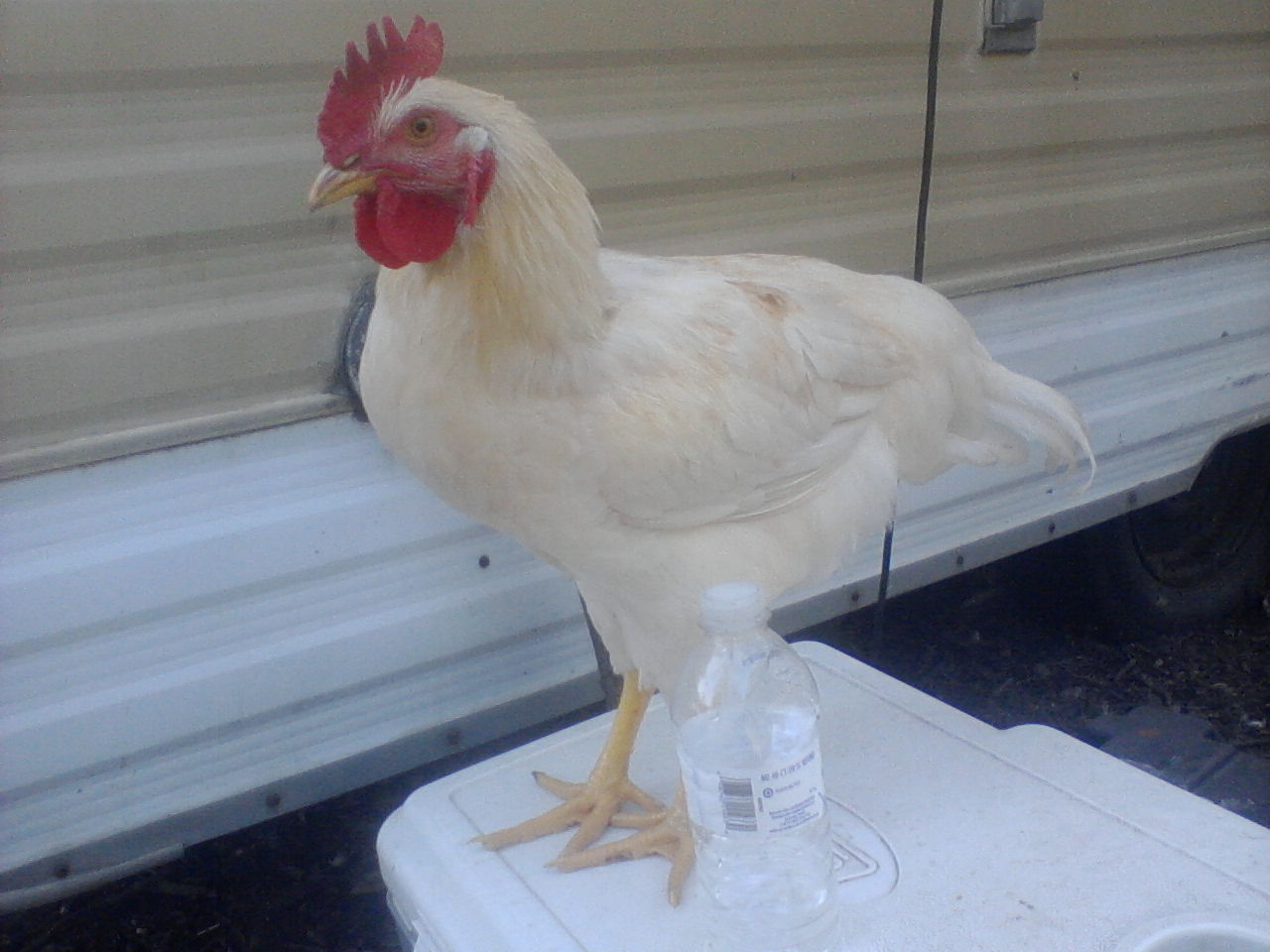
A red sex-link rooster

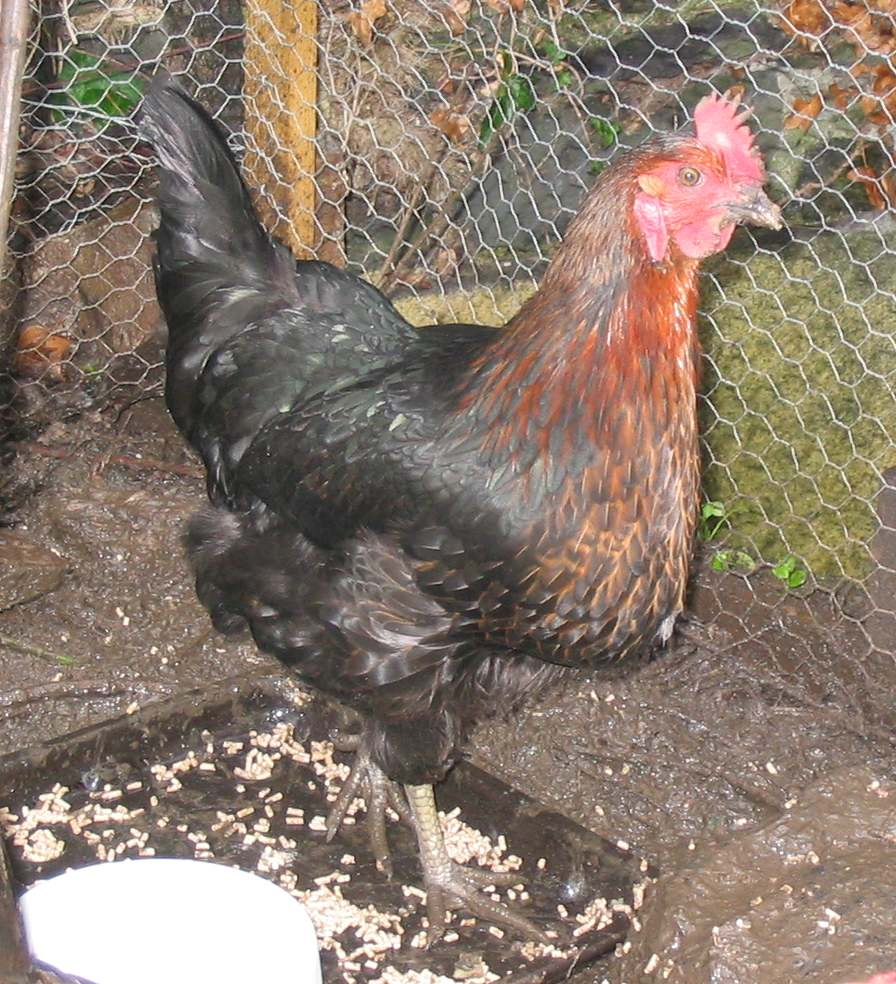
A Black Rock hen

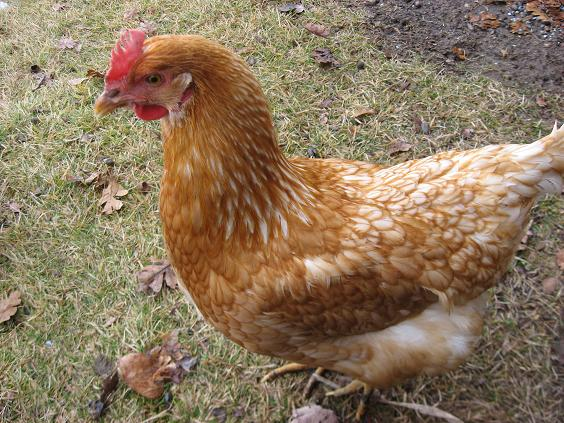
A red sex-link pullet

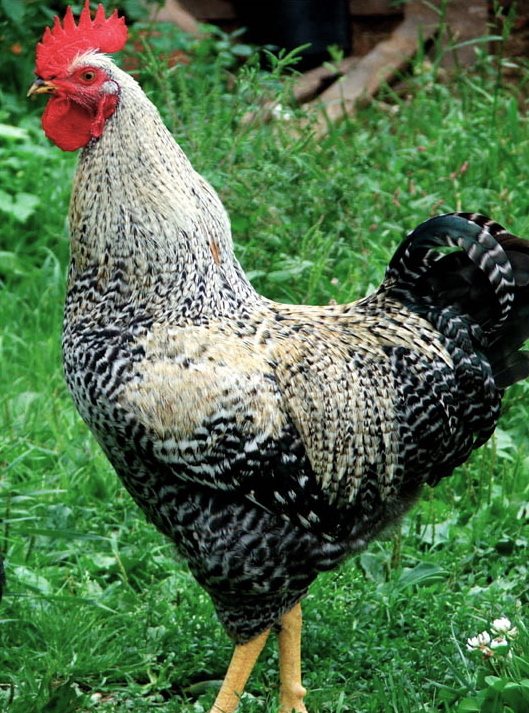
A black sex-link rooster

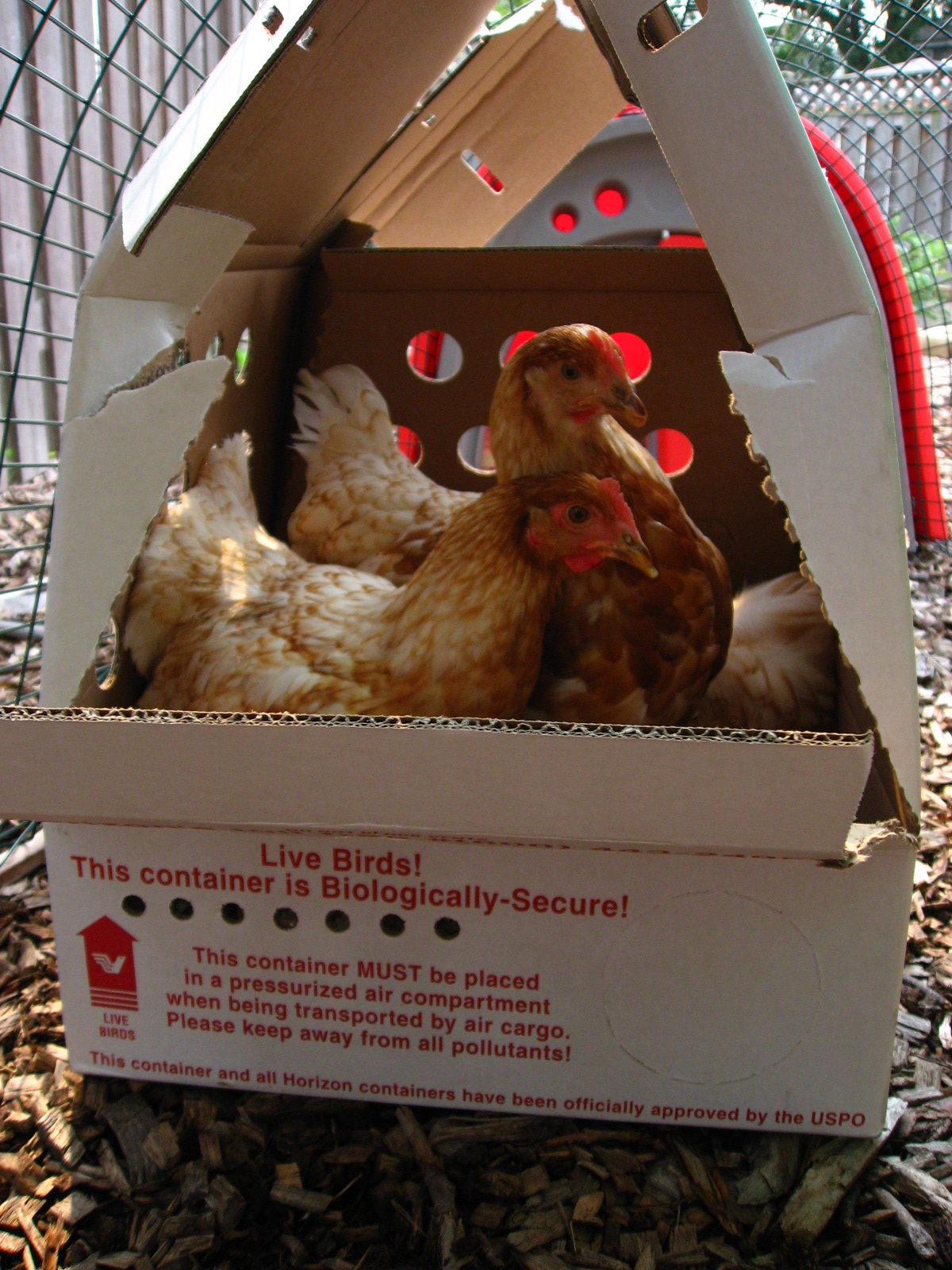
Shipped pullets

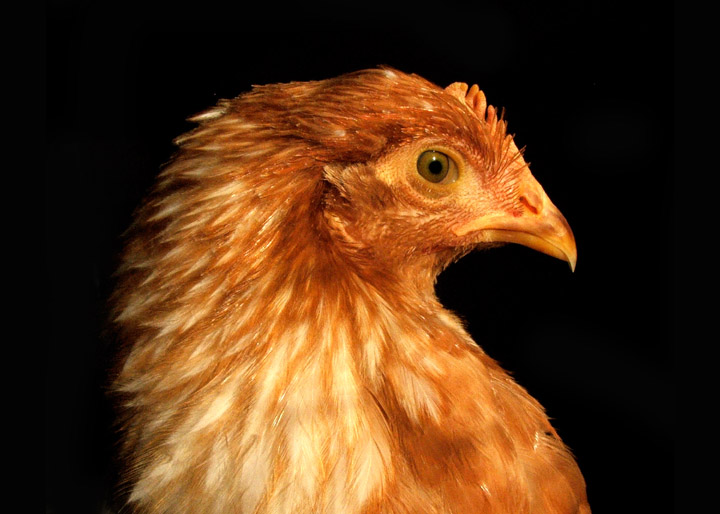
Red sex-link hen

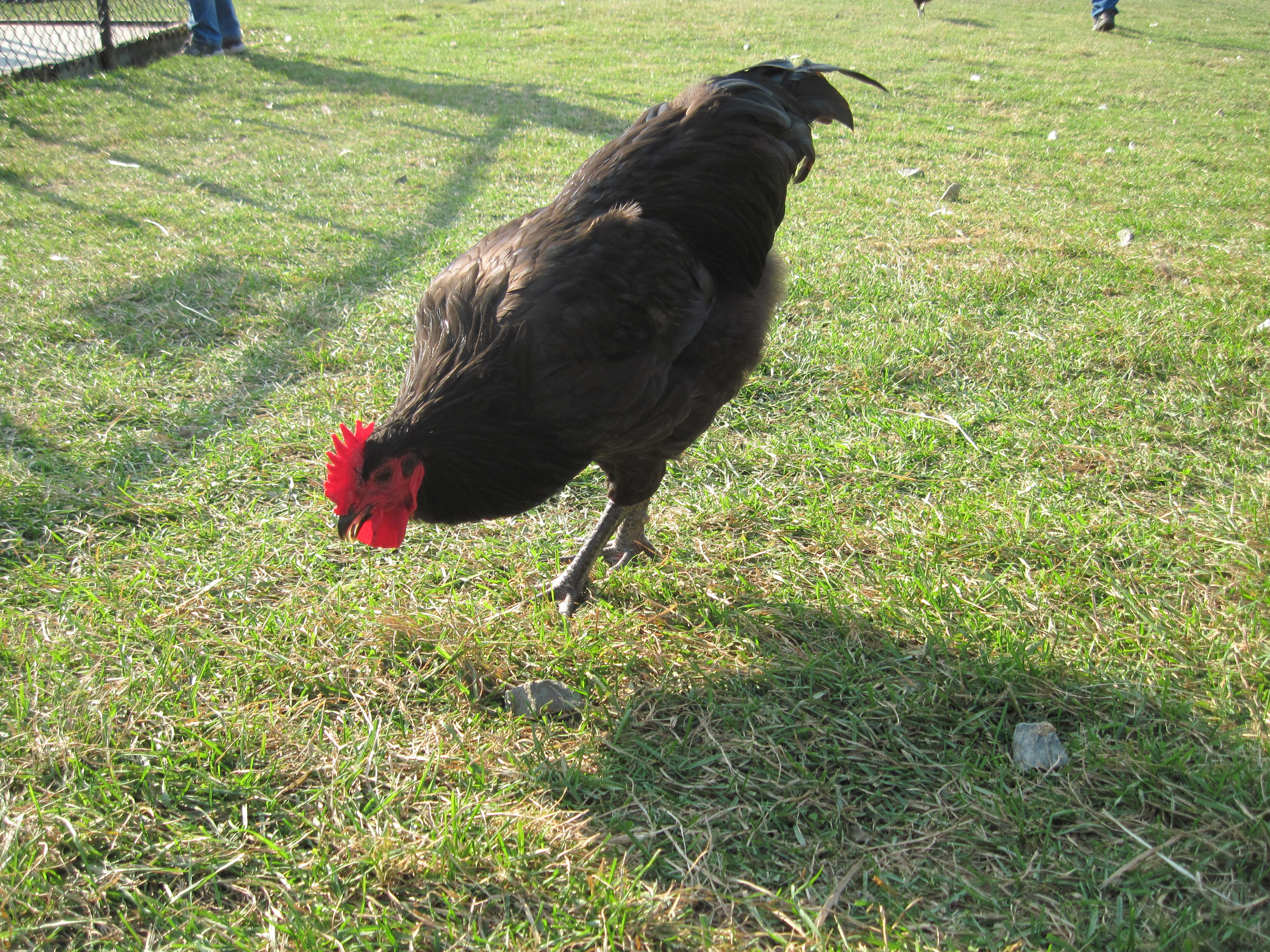
Another black sex-link cock

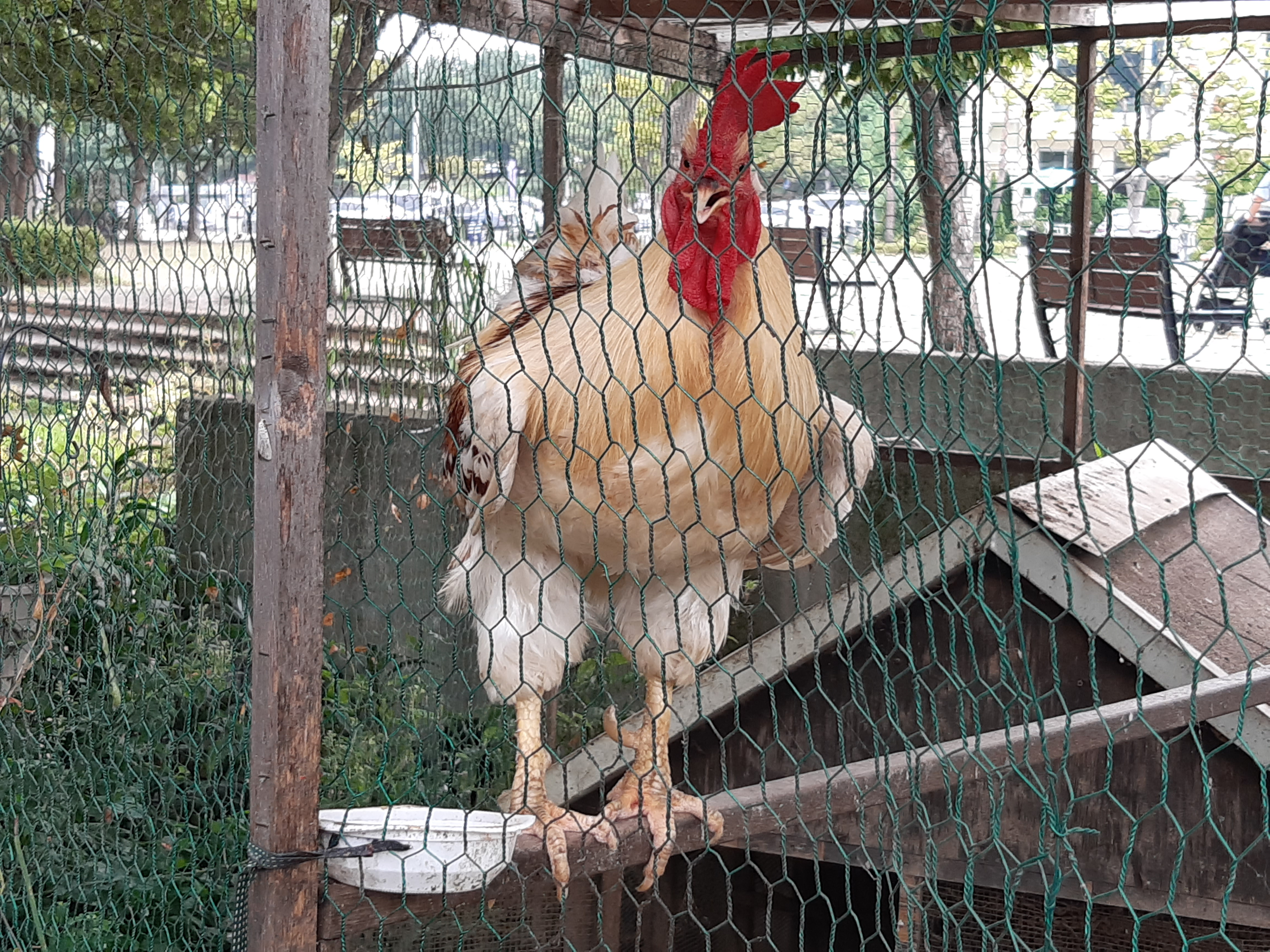
A red shouldered sex-link cock

== See also ==
- ZW sex-determination system
- List of chicken breeds
