= Reginald Punnett =

British geneticist (1875–1967)

Reginald Punnett FRS
- Reginald C. Punnett
- Born: Reginald Crundall Punnett; 20 June 1875; Tonbridge, Kent, England
- Died: 3 January 1967 (aged 91); Bilbrook, Somerset, England
- Education: Gonville and Caius College, Cambridge
- Known for: Journal of Genetics; Punnett square
- Scientific career
- Fields: Genetics
- Institutions: University of Cambridge

Reginald Crundall Punnett FRS (/ˈpʌnɪt/; 20 June 1875 – 3 January 1967) was a British geneticist who co-founded, with William Bateson, the Journal of Genetics in 1910. Punnett is probably best remembered today as the creator of the Punnett square, a tool still used by biologists to predict the probability of possible genotypes of offspring. His Mendelism (1905) is sometimes said to have been the first textbook on genetics; it was probably the first popular science book to introduce genetics to the public.

== Life and work ==
Reginald Punnett was born in 1875 in the town of Tonbridge in Kent, England. While recovering from a childhood bout of appendicitis, Punnett became acquainted with Jardine's The Naturalist's Library and developed an interest in natural history. Punnett was educated at Clifton College.

Attending Gonville and Caius College, Cambridge, Punnett earned a bachelor's degree in zoology in 1898 and a master's degree in 1901. Between these degrees he worked as a demonstrator and part-time lecturer at the University of St Andrews Natural History Department. In October 1901, Punnett was elected to a Fellowship at Gonville and Caius College, working in zoology, primarily the study of worms, specifically nemerteans. During this time he and William Bateson began a research collaboration, which lasted several years.

When Punnett was an undergraduate, Gregor Mendel's work on inheritance was largely unknown and unappreciated by scientists. However, in 1900, Mendel's work was rediscovered by Carl Correns, Erich Tschermak von Seysenegg and Hugo de Vries. William Bateson became a proponent of Mendelian genetics and had Mendel's work translated into English. It was with Bateson that Punnett helped establish the new science of genetics at Cambridge. He, Bateson and Saunders co-discovered genetic linkage through experiments with chickens and sweet peas.

A Punnett square

In 1905 Punnett devised what is now called the Punnett square, a square diagram that is used to predict the genotypes of a particular cross or breeding experiment, described for the first time in the 2nd edition of his book.

In 1908, unable to explain how a dominant allele would not become fixed and ubiquitous in a population, Punnett introduced one of his problems to the mathematician G. H. Hardy, with whom he played cricket. Hardy went on to formulate the Hardy–Weinberg principle, independently of the German Wilhelm Weinberg. Punnett was Superintendent of the Cambridge University Museum of Zoology from 1908 to 1909.

In 1909 he went to Sri Lanka to meet Arthur Willey, FRS, then Director of the Colombo Museum and Robert Heath Lock, then Scientific Assistant at the Peradeniya Botanical Gardens and to catch butterflies. The following year, he published a monograph, '"Mimicry" in Ceylon Butterflies, with a suggestion as to the nature of Polymorphism', in Spolia Zeylanica, the journal of the Colombo Museum, in which he voiced his opposition to gradualistic accounts of the evolution of mimicry which he later expanded on, in his 1915 book Mimicry in Butterflies.

In 1910 Punnett became a professor of biology at Cambridge, and then the first Arthur Balfour Professor of Genetics when Bateson left in 1912. In the same year, Punnett was elected a Fellow of the Royal Society. He received the society's Darwin Medal in 1922.

During the First World War, Punnett successfully applied his expertise to the problem of the early determination of sex in chickens. Since only females were used for egg-production, early identification of male chicks, which were destroyed or separated for fattening, meant that limited animal-feed and other resources could be used more efficiently. Punnett's work in this area was summarised in Heredity in Poultry (1923). With Michael Pease as his assistant, he created the first auto-sexing chicken breed, the Cambar, by transferring the barring gene of the Barred Rock to the Golden Campine.

Reginald Punnett retired in 1940, and died at the age of 91 in 1967 in Bilbrook, Somerset.

In May 2026 a blue plaque commemorating Reginald Punnett was unveiled on his childhood home in Dry Hill Road, Tonbridge.

== Selected writings ==
- Punnett, R. C. (1901). Lineus. London: Williams and Norgate. "punnett."
- Punnett, R. C. (1905). Mendelism. Cambridge: Bowes and Bowes.- A scanned copy of the second edition is here.
- Punnett, R. C. (1915). Mimicry in Butterflies. Cambridge: Cambridge University Press.
