= List of crested chicken breeds =

This is a list of breeds of crested chicken.

Local name(s)	English name if used	Notes	Image
Annaberger Haubenstrupphuhn			
Appenzeller Spitzhauben			
Araucana			
Barbu de Boitsfort			
Barbu de Watermael			
Brabançonne	Brabanter		
	Cream Legbar		
	Burmese Bantam		
Crèvecœur			
Houdan			
Kaulhühner			
	Kosova Long-crowing		
Nederlandse uilebaard			
Padovana			
Pavlovskaya			
German: Paduaner (bearded); Hollandische Haubenhuhn (beardless); Dutch: Nederlandse Baardkuifhoender (bearded); Hollandse Kuifhoender (beardless)	Poland		
Polverara			
Posavska kukmasta kokoš			
	Silkie		
Sulmtaler			
	Sultan		
Ukrainian Crested			
