= Silkie (chicken breed) =

Chinese fluffy breed of chicken

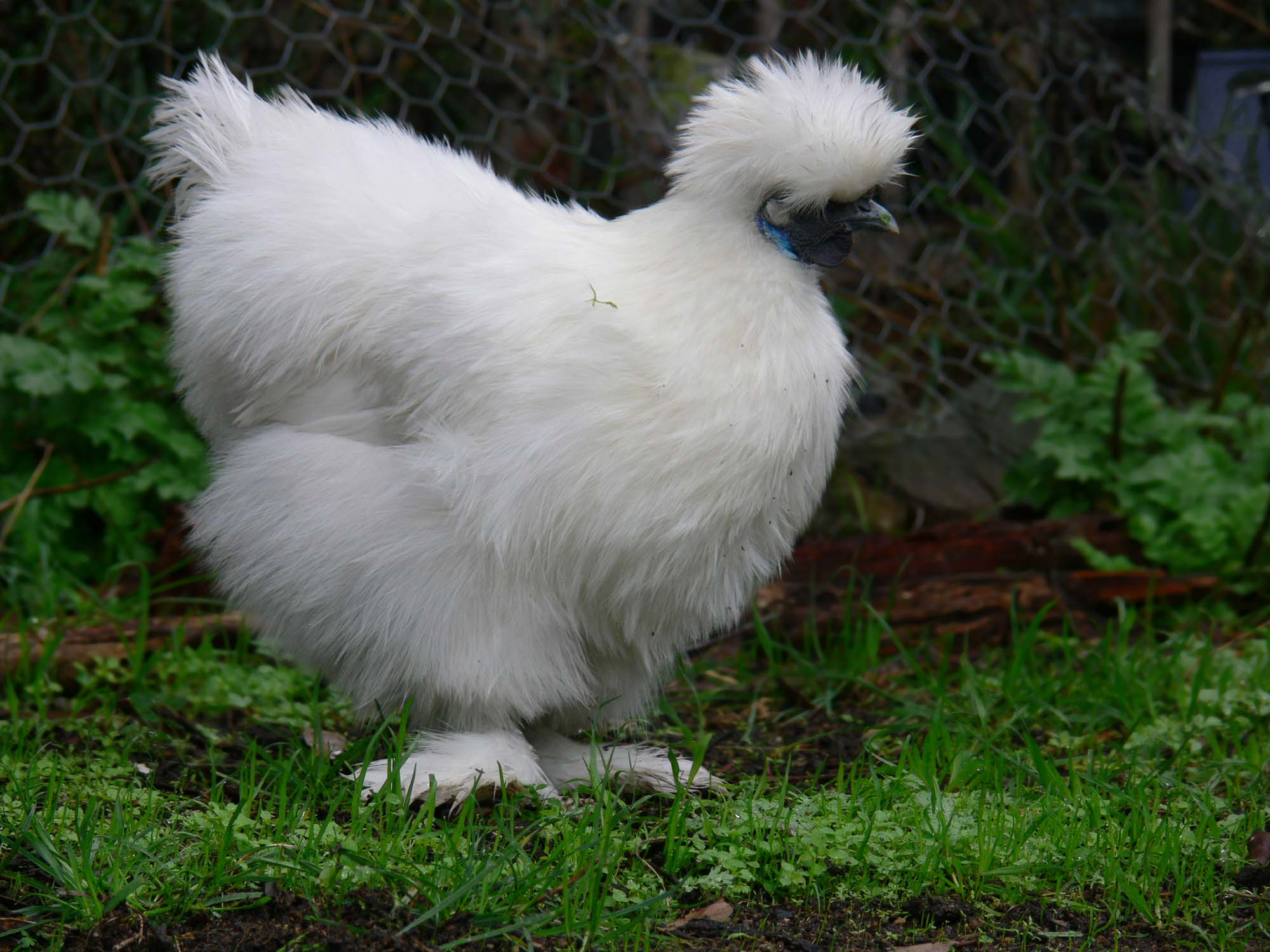
- The white
- Other names: Silky; Chinese silk chicken
- Country of origin: China

Traits
- Weight: Male: Europe: Standard: 1.4–1.7 kg (3–3.5 lb); Bantam: 0.6 kg (1.3 lb); United States: Bantam: 1.4 kg (3 lb); Female: Europe: Standard: 1.1–1.4 kg (2.5–3 lb); Bantam: 0.5 kg (1.1 lb); United States: Bantam: 0.9 kg (2 lb)
- Skin color: black, brown or blue
- Egg color: White, cream or tinted
- Comb type: walnut

Classification
- APA: Asiatic
- EE: yes
- PCGB: soft feather: light
- Chicken; Gallus gallus domesticus

The Silkie, also known as the Silky or Chinese silk chicken, is a Chinese breed of chickens named for its atypically fluffy plumage, which is soft to the touch, like silk or fur. Its other unusual qualities include black skin and bones, blue earlobes, and pentadactyly (five toes on each foot) – most chickens have only four.

The birds are commonly reared for exhibition in poultry shows, and a number of color varieties have been bred; the Entente Européenne recognises 10 plumage colors, the American Poultry Association seven, and the Poultry Club of Great Britain five. Both bearded and non-bearded forms of most colours exist. In European countries, both bantam and large fowl are recognised, while in the United States, only the bantam is listed.

Silkie hens show a strong tendency to broodiness and are commonly used to hatch eggs from other breeds and bird species; as a result of the same tendency, they lay relatively few eggs.

== History ==
Exactly where or when these fowl with their singular combination of attributes first appeared is unknown, but the most well-documented point of origin is ancient China. Other places in Southeast Asia have been named as possibilities, such as India and Java. The earliest surviving Western written account of Silkies comes from Marco Polo, who wrote of a "furry" chicken in the 13th century during his travels in Asia. In 1598, Ulisse Aldrovandi, a writer and naturalist at the University of Bologna, Italy, published a comprehensive treatise on chickens, which is still read and admired today. In it, he mentions "wool-bearing chickens" and ones "clothed with hair like that of a black cat".

Silkies most likely made their way to the West via the Silk Route and maritime trade. The breed was recognized officially in North America with acceptance into the Standard of Perfection in 1874. Once Silkies became more common in the West, many myths were perpetuated about them. Early Dutch breeders told buyers they were the offspring of chickens and rabbits, while sideshows promoted them as having actual mammalian fur.

In the 21st century, Silkies are one of the most popular and ubiquitous ornamental breeds of chickens. They are often kept as ornamental fowl or pet chickens by backyard keepers and are also commonly used to incubate and raise the offspring of other chickens and waterfowl such as ducks, geese, and game birds, including quail and pheasants.

== Characteristics ==
Foot of a bantam showing polydactyly

Silkies are considered a bantam breed in some countries, but this varies according to region, and many breed standards class them officially as large fowl; the bantam Silkie is actually a separate variety most of the time. Almost all North American strains of the breed are bantam-sized, but in Europe, the standard-sized is the original version. However, even standard Silkies are relatively small chickens, with the males weighing only 1.8 kg (4 lb),and females weighing 1.4 kg (3 lb). The American Standard of Perfection calls for males that are 1 kg (36 oz) and females that are 900 g (32 oz).

Silkie plumage was once unique among chicken breeds, but in recent years, such feathering has been developed in several breeds, mostly notably the Chabo, where it is now standardised in Britain and the Netherlands. It has been compared to silk, and to fur. The overall result is a soft, fluffy appearance. Their feathers lack functioning barbicels, thus are similar to down on other birds. This characteristic leaves Silkies unable to fly. However, they are still regarded as an immensely popular breed, known for their cuddliness, fluffiness, quality as food, and beauty.

Silkies appear in two distinct varieties, bearded and non-bearded. Bearded Silkies have an extra muff of feathers under the beak area that covers the earlobes. They also are separated according to color. Colors of Silkie recognized for competitive showing include black, blue, splash, lavender, buff, grey, partridge, and white. Alternative hues, such as cuckoo, mottled, chocolate, mauve, mille fleur, and red, are in various stages of development and/or awaiting official recognition. The standards of perfection call for all Silkies to have a small, walnut-shaped comb, dark wattles, and turquoise-blue earlobes. In addition to these defining characteristics, Silkies have five toes on each foot. Other breeds that exhibit this rare trait include the Dorking, Faverolles, Houdan, and Sultan.

All Silkies have black or bluish skin and bones and grayish-black meat; they are in the group of Chinese fowls known by the Chinese-language name of wu gu ji (烏骨雞), meaning black-boned chicken. More specifically, the Silkie breed itself is named Taihe wu ji (泰和乌鸡), black-boned chicken from Taihe. Other wu gu ji may not share characteristics of the Taihe breed, such as the mulberry comb, white fur, blue ears, and polydactyly.

Melanism, which extends beyond the skin into an animal's connective tissue, is a rare trait, and in chickens, it is caused by fibromelanosis, which is a rare mutation believed to have begun in Asia. The Silkie and several other breeds descended from Asian stock possess the mutation. Disregarding color, the breed does not generally produce as much as the more common meat breeds of chicken.

=== Bantams ===
In the American Standard of Perfection, the standard male weight for the bantam Silkie is 1 kg (35 oz) and for the female is 900 g (32 oz). The Australian Poultry Standard and British Poultry Standard call for Silkie bantams to be much smaller; in the Australian, the standard weights are 680 g (25 oz) for males and 570 g (20 oz) for females. The British standard weight for bantam Silkies is 600 g (22 oz) for males, and 500 g for females (18 oz).

=== Polydactyly ===
Silkies are also known for their polydactyly, usually manifesting as an additional one or two digits in the foot. The genetic cause of this extra digit formation has been shown to be a single-nucleotide polymorphism in the regulator of the SHH gene, called the ZPA regulatory sequence. This causes ectopic SHH expression in the anterior of the developing limb bud, leading to increased tissue growth and digits. While the feet of the Silkie display polydactyly, the wings have the standard tridactyly (three-digit) arrangement. The Japanese Silkie initially develops additional digits in the wing as an embryo, but these are lost prior to hatching. The genetic cause behind Silkie polydactyly differs from those that cause polydactyly in the Dorking chicken breed, which is due to ectopic FGF4 expression in the apical ectodermal ridge, with ectopic SHH as a secondary effect.

== Use ==
Silkies lay a fair number of eggs, ranging from white to cream or light tan, but production is often interrupted due to their extreme tendency to go broody. A Silkie hen can produce 100 eggs in an ideal year. Their capacity for incubation, which has been selectively bred out of most fowl bred especially for egg production, is often exploited by poultry keepers by allowing Silkies to raise the offspring of other birds. Their primary modern usage today is mainly for companionship, as they are extremely friendly breeds that enjoy being cuddled.

== In cuisine ==
The black meat of a Silkie is generally considered an unusual attribute in European and American cuisines. In contrast, several Asian cuisines consider Silkie meat to be a gourmet food. Chinese cuisine especially values the breed, but it is also a common ingredient in some Japanese, Cambodian, Vietnamese, and Korean dishes. Areas where Chinese cuisine has a strong influence, such as Malaysia, may also cook Silkie chickens. As early as the seventh century, traditional Chinese medicine has held that chicken soup made with Silkie meat is a curative food. The usual methods of cooking include braising or using Silkie to make broth or curries. Traditional Chinese soup made with Silkie also uses ingredients such as wolfberries, Dioscorea polystachya (mountain yam), aged dried citrus peel, and fresh ginger. A few fusion restaurants in metropolitan areas of the West have also cooked it as a part of traditional American or French cuisine, such as in confit.

== Gallery ==
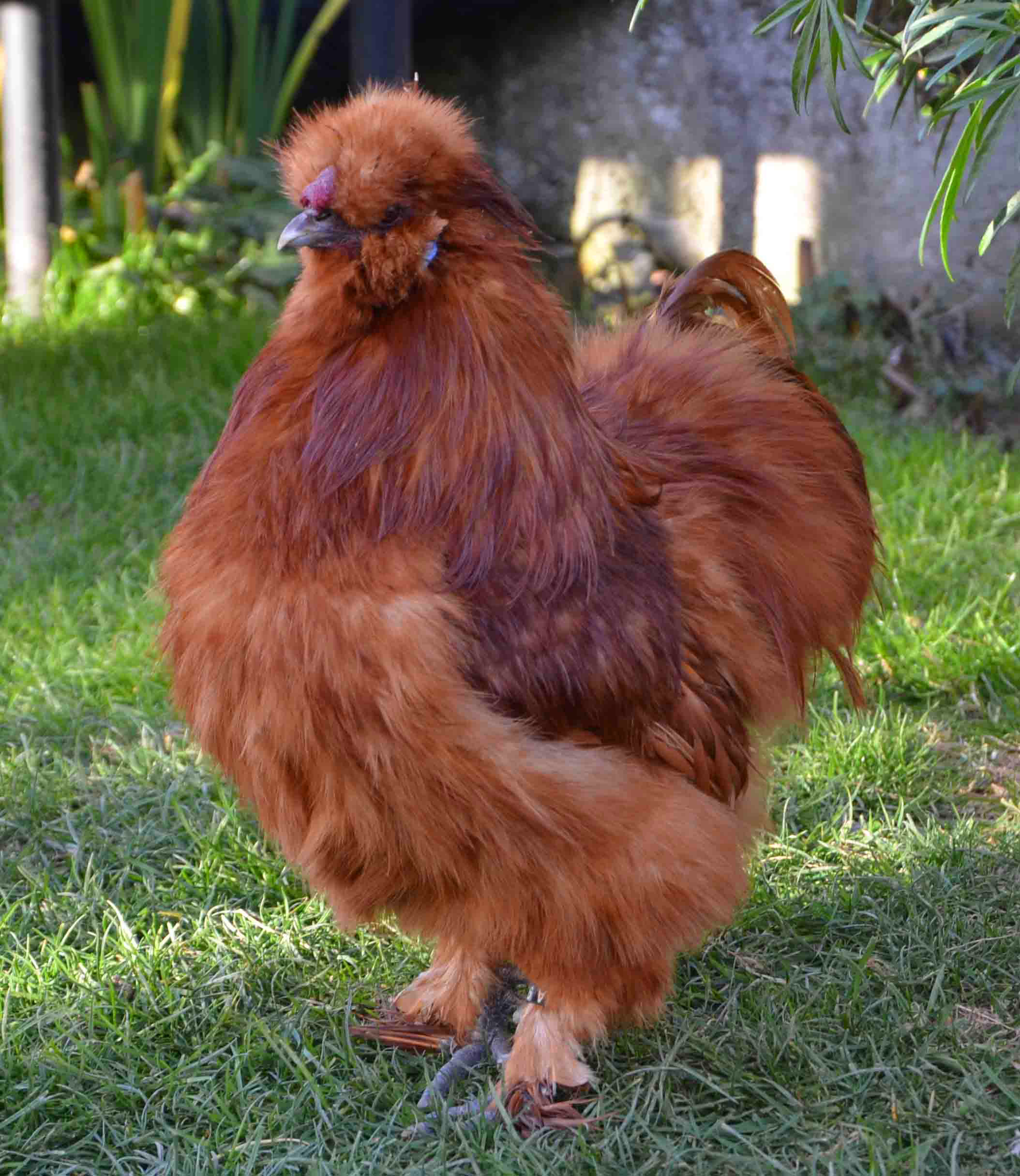
The red

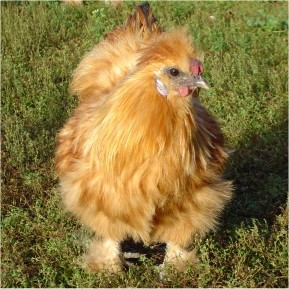
The buff

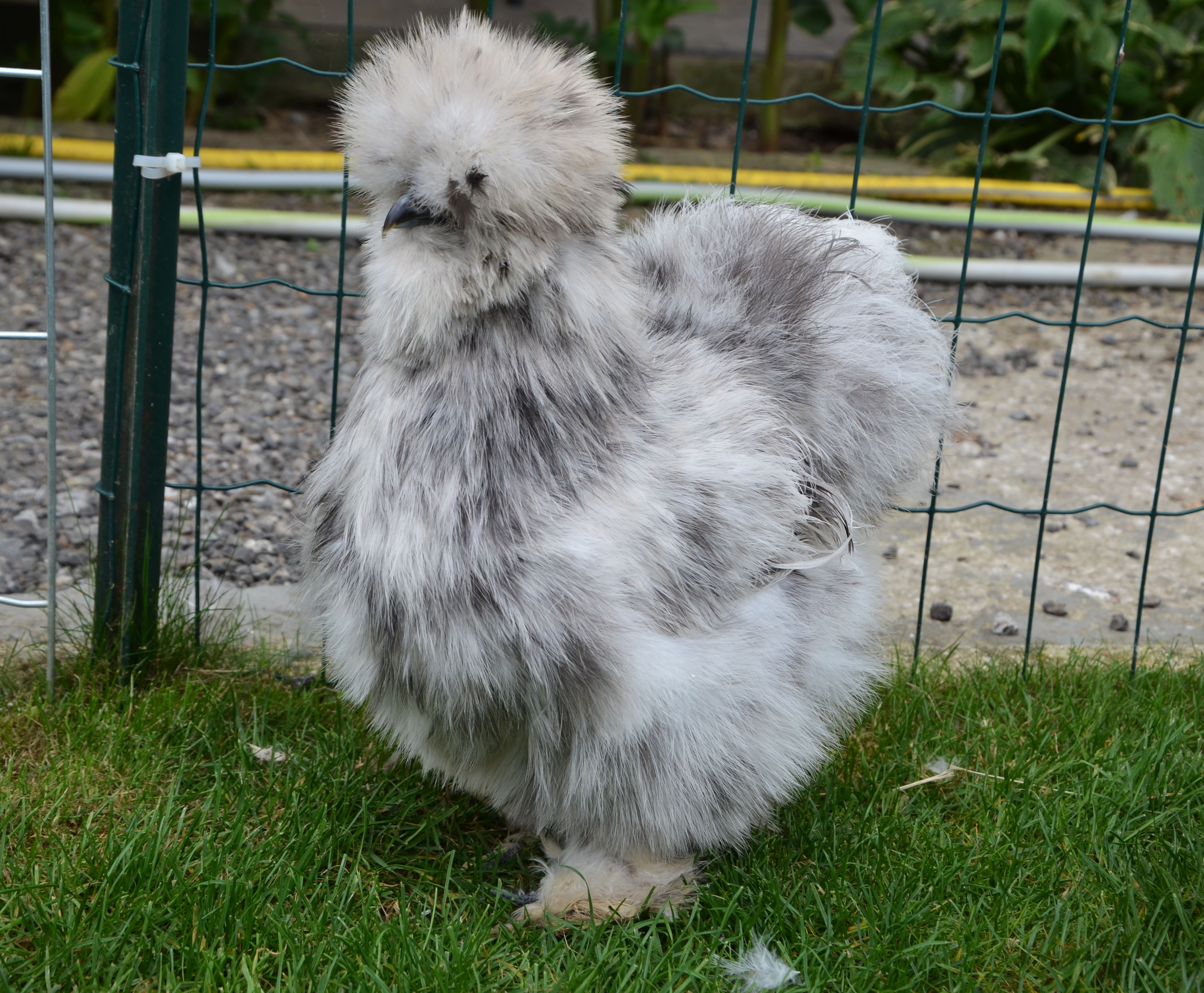
The splash

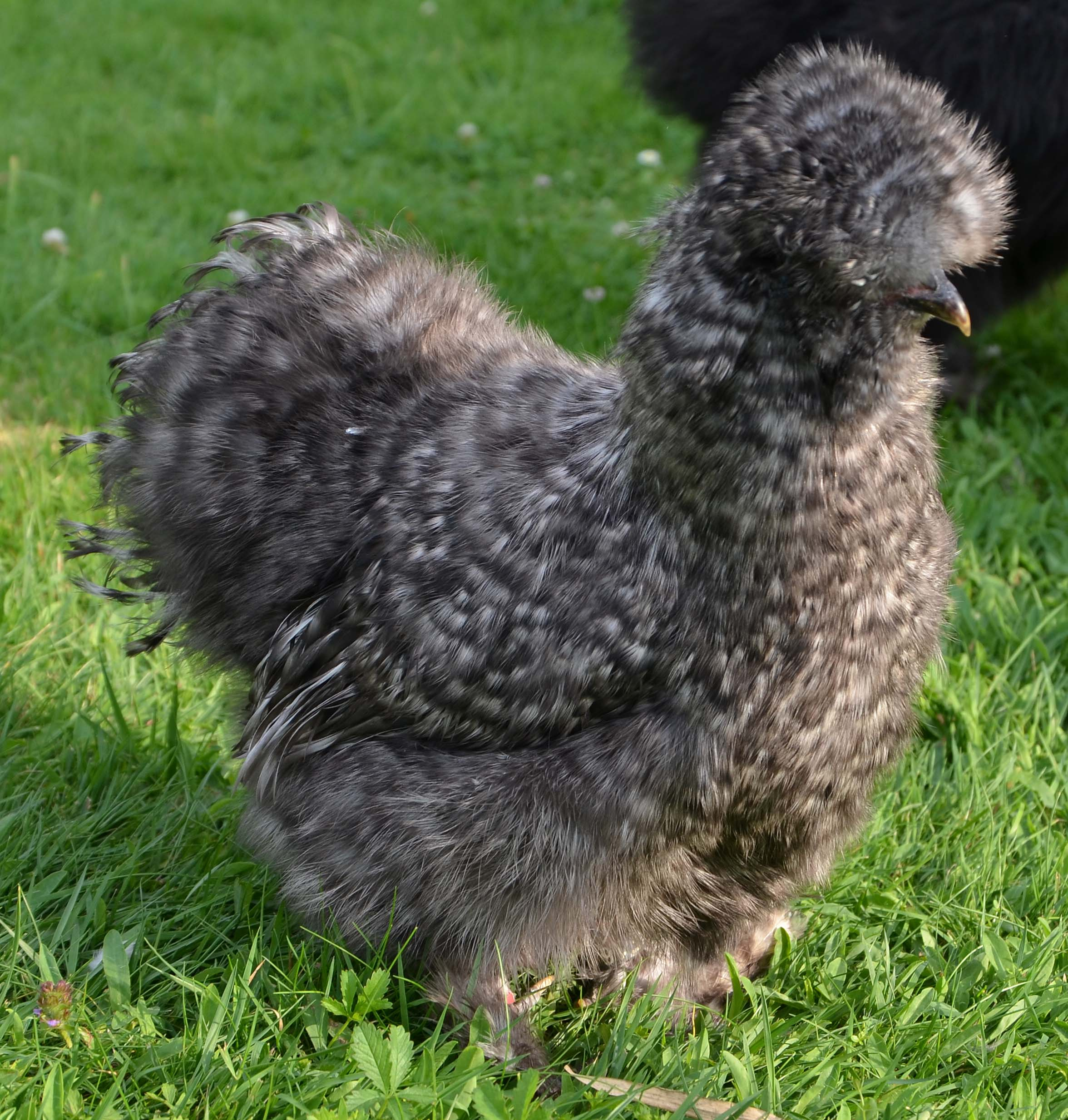
The cuckoo

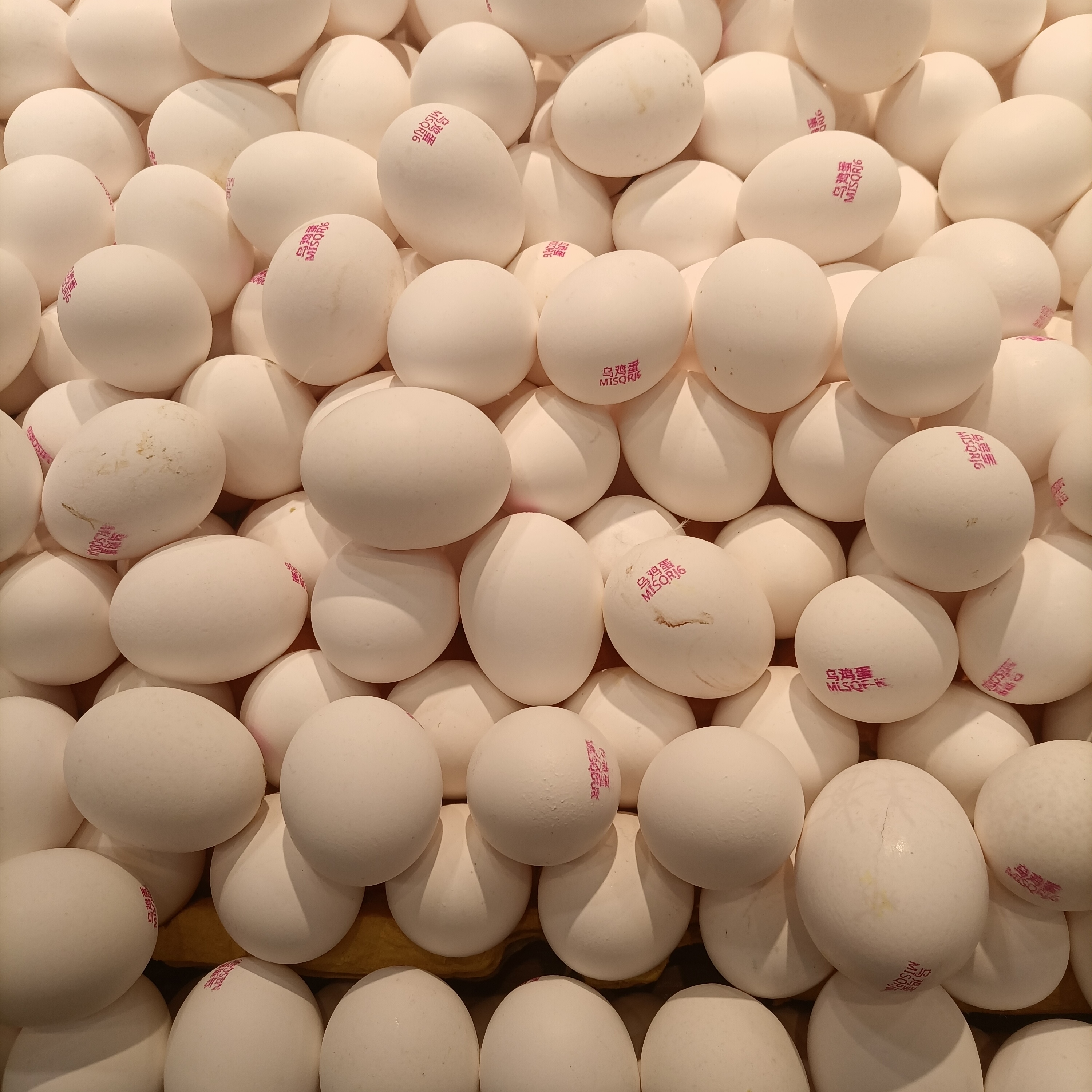
Eggs
