= Brabanter =

Breed of chicken

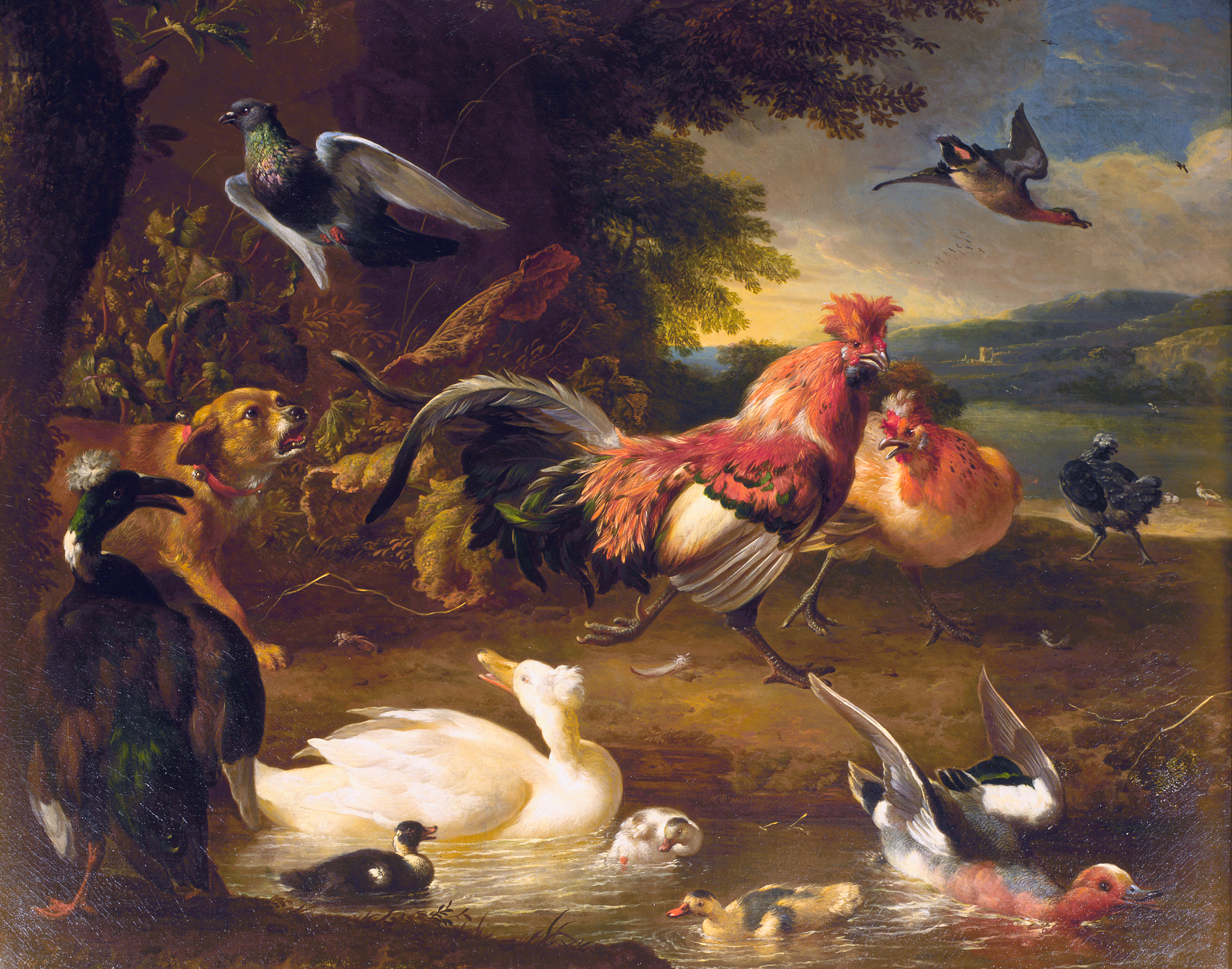
- A painting by Melchior d'Hondecoeter, apparently showing a Brabanter cock and hen
- Conservation status: endangered
- Other names: Brabançonne
- Country of origin: Netherlands

Traits
- Weight: Male: Standard: 1.9–2.5 kg; Bantam: 0.9–1.0 kg; Female: Standard: 1.6–2.0 kg; Bantam: 0.7–0.8 kg
- Comb type: v-shaped

Classification
- PCGB: rare soft feather: light
- Chicken; Gallus gallus domesticus

The Brabanter is a Dutch breed of crested chicken originating in the historic region of Brabant which straddles Belgium and the Netherlands. It is an ancient breed and is shown in seventeenth-century paintings. A bantam Brabanter was created in around 1934.

== History ==
The Brabanter has been bred in the Netherlands, and particularly in Brabant, for a long time – similar birds are shown in a painting of 1676 by the Dutch artist Melchior d'Hondecoeter. It soon spread from its area of origin. Black and cuckoo Brabanters were shown at the first German poultry exhibition, at Görlitz in Saxony, in 1854. The Brabanter nearly became extinct in the early twentieth century, but was recovered by cross-breeding with other crested and bearded birds.

== Characteristics ==
The Brabanter is among the lightest of chicken breeds; cocks weigh 1.9 to 2.5 kg and hens 1.6 to 2.0 kg. It has a narrow crest and a trilobar beard and muff. The crest is unlike that of most other crested breeds such as the Poland: it projects upwards and slightly forwards like that of the similar Swiss Appenzeller Spitzhauben. The Brabanter has a v-shaped comb. The earlobes are small and white, and the wattles are often absent; both earlobes and wattles are hidden by the beard.

Seven colour varieties are recognised in the Netherlands: black, chamois, cuckoo, gold spangled, laced blue, silver spangled and white; in Germany there are thirteen.

A bantam Brabanter was created in about 1934 by cross-breeding the standard-sized Brabanter with bearded bantams of the Poland breed.

== Use ==
Hens lay approximately 170 white eggs per year, with an average weight of 52 g; bantam hens lay about 100 eggs a year, averaging 35 g in weight.
