= Comb (anatomy) =

Crest on the top of the head of some gallinaceous birds

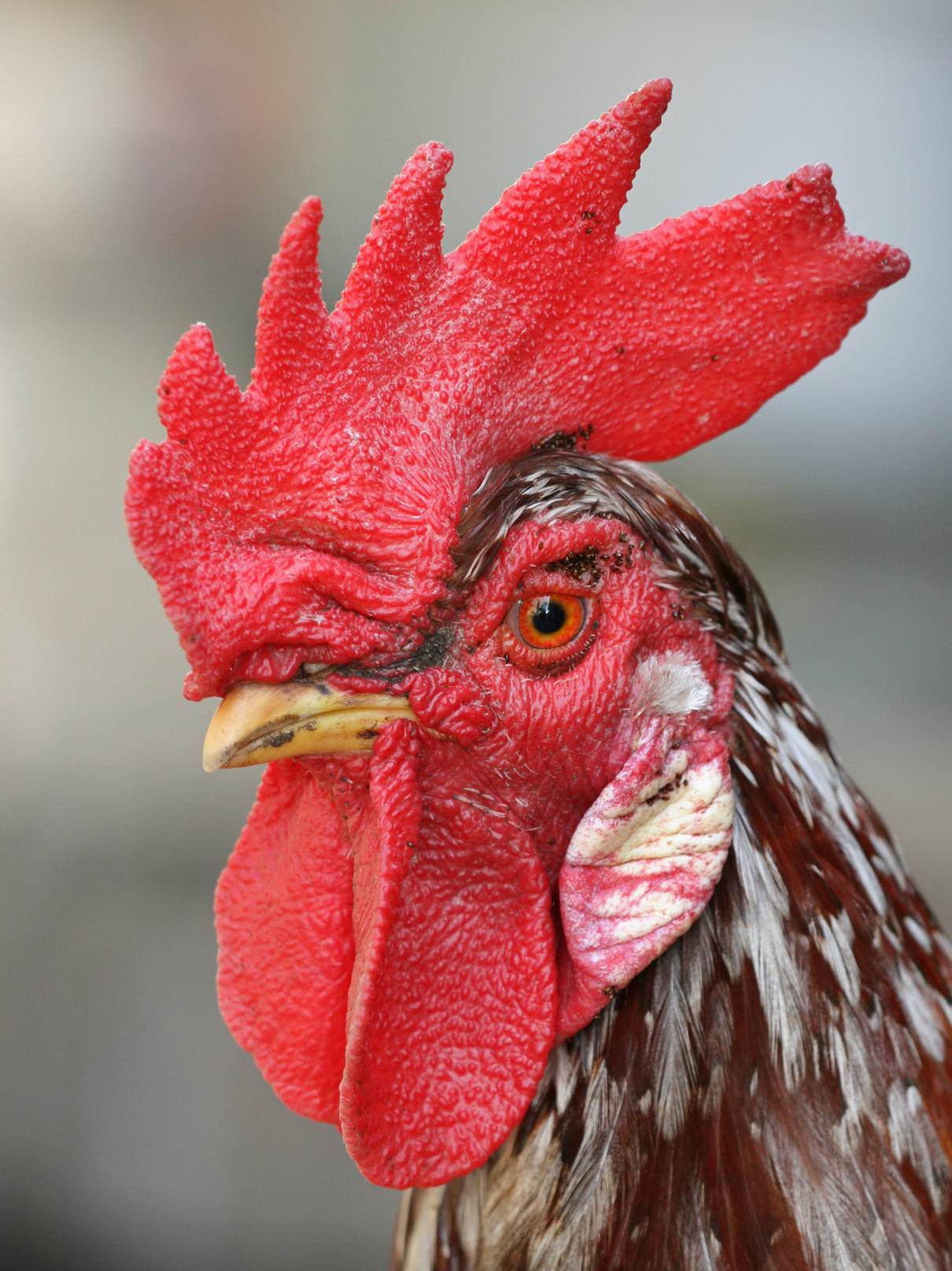
Single comb

A comb is a fleshy growth or crest on the top of the head of some gallinaceous birds, such as domestic chickens. The alternative name cockscomb (with several spelling variations) reflects the fact that combs are generally larger on cock birds than on hens. The comb is one of several fleshy protuberances on the heads of chickens, the others being the wattles and earlobes, which collectively are called caruncles. In turkeys, the caruncles are the fleshy nodules on the head and throat.

Chicken combs are most commonly red, but may also be black or dark purple in breeds such as the Silkie or the Sebright. In other species the color may vary from light grey to deep blue or red.

The comb may be a reliable indicator of health or vigor and is used for mate-assessment in some poultry species.

== Types of chicken comb ==
Comb shape varies considerably depending on the breed or species of bird. Of the many types and shapes seen in chicken cocks the principal ones are:

- the single comb, extending in a single line from the top of the base of the beak to the back of the head. It consists of a solid vertical part with a series of points or serrations; the size, shape and number of these and the overall shape of the comb are all variable, depending on the breed.
- the cup comb or buttercup comb, as seen in the Sicilian Buttercup, a cup-shaped comb with spiked edges.
- the cushion comb, as seen in the Chantecler and Silkie, is a compact cushion-shaped mass covered with small protuberances, with a shallow transverse groove across it.
- the horn comb or V-comb, as seen in breeds such as the Crèvecœur, La Flèche and Sultan, with two spikes in a V shape starting above the beak, tapering to a point from a thick base.
- the leaf comb or shell comb, as seen in the Houdan, which resembles a butterfly with partially-opened wings.
- the pea comb or triple comb, somewhat like three small single combs in a row; seen in breeds including the Araucana, Brahma, Buckeye, Indian Game, Ixworth, Malay, Sumatra among others.
- the raspberry comb, as seen in the Orloff, which roughly resembles half a raspberry, cut lengthwise.
- the rose comb, as seen in the Hamburg and Wyandotte, broad and fairly fast, covered with small pointed protuberances, with a long backwards-facing spike to the rear.
- the strawberry or walnut comb, as seen in the Malay, which roughly resembles half a strawberry or walnut.

In hens, the comb is usually smaller and neater than in the cock.

There are three known genes affecting comb shape: Rose-Comb, Pea-Comb, and Duplex-Comb, which has one allele responsible for buttercup combs and another one responsible for V combs.

== In cookery ==
Combs are used in cookery, often in combination with wattles or chicken kidneys.

Combs were formerly used in French cuisine as garnishes. They were also used to prepare salpicons served in vol-au-vents, profiteroles, etc. in which they were often combined with other luxury ingredients such as truffles, sweetbreads, or morels in a cream sauce.

In Italian cuisine, cockscombs are an ingredient of cibreo, a traditional sauce which also includes chicken livers, wattles and unlaid eggs. It is used in the pasta dish tagliatelli al cibreo and in the main dish ciambella con cibreo.

Combs are prepared by parboiling and skinning, then cooking in court-bouillon. After preparation, they are greyish. They are often served in Chinese dim sum-style dishes.

== Other ==
Because of its bright color and distinctive shape, "cockscomb" also describes various plants, including the florists' plant Celosia cristata, the meadow weed yellow rattle, sainfoin, wild poppy, lousewort, Erythronium and Erythrina crista-galli; the characteristic jester's cap; a shape of pasta (creste di galli); and so on. Hyaluronic acid, which is used in skincare and medical treatments to hydrate and maintain moisture in the skin, is extracted from cockscomb.

== Spelling variations ==
- cockscomb
- cock's comb
- cock's-comb
- coxcomb

== Gallery ==
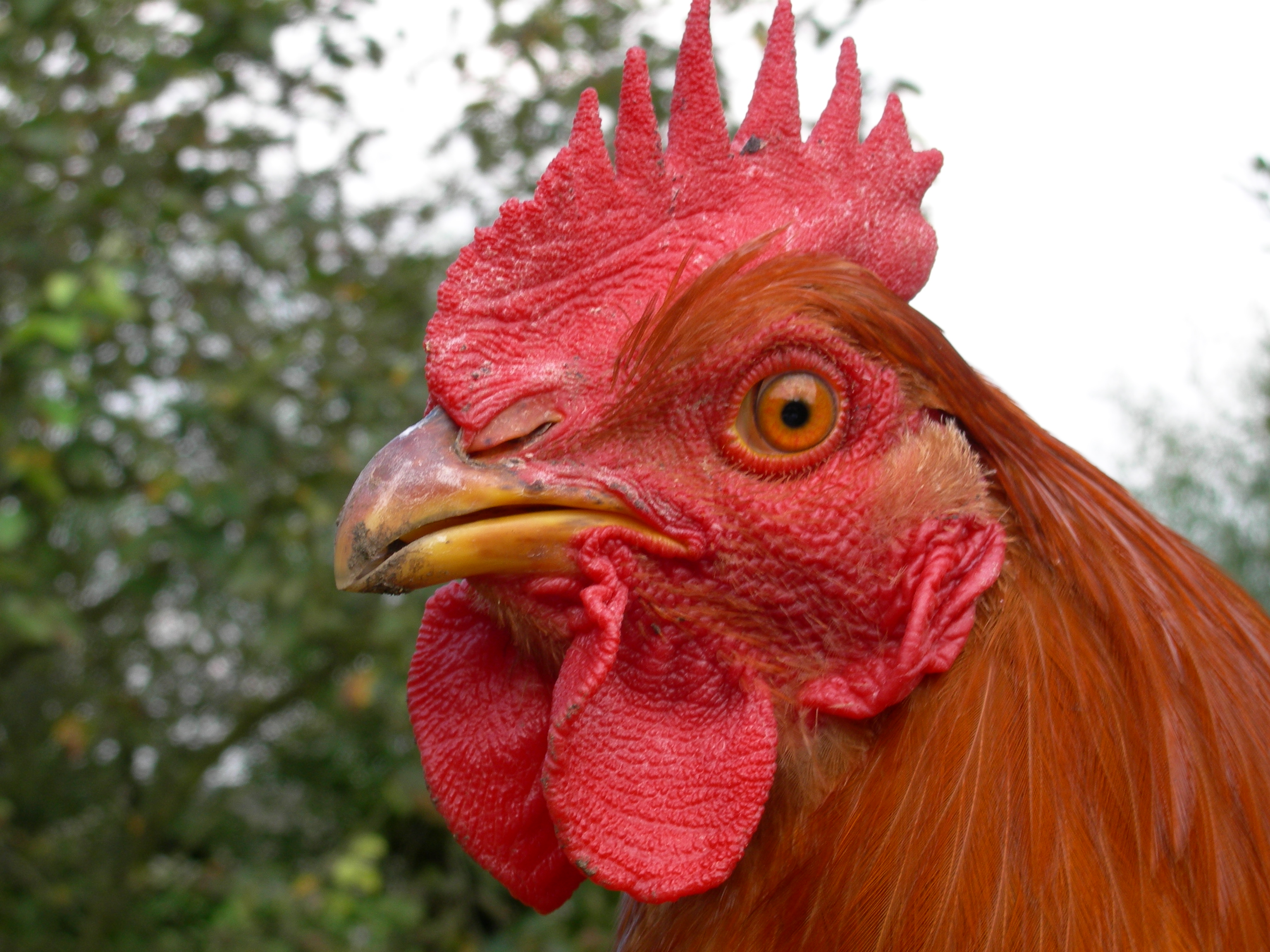
Brown rooster

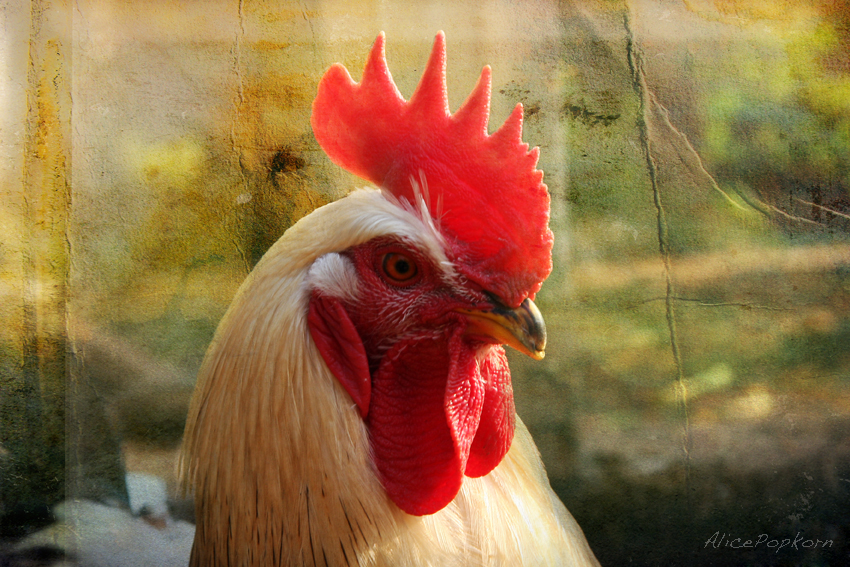

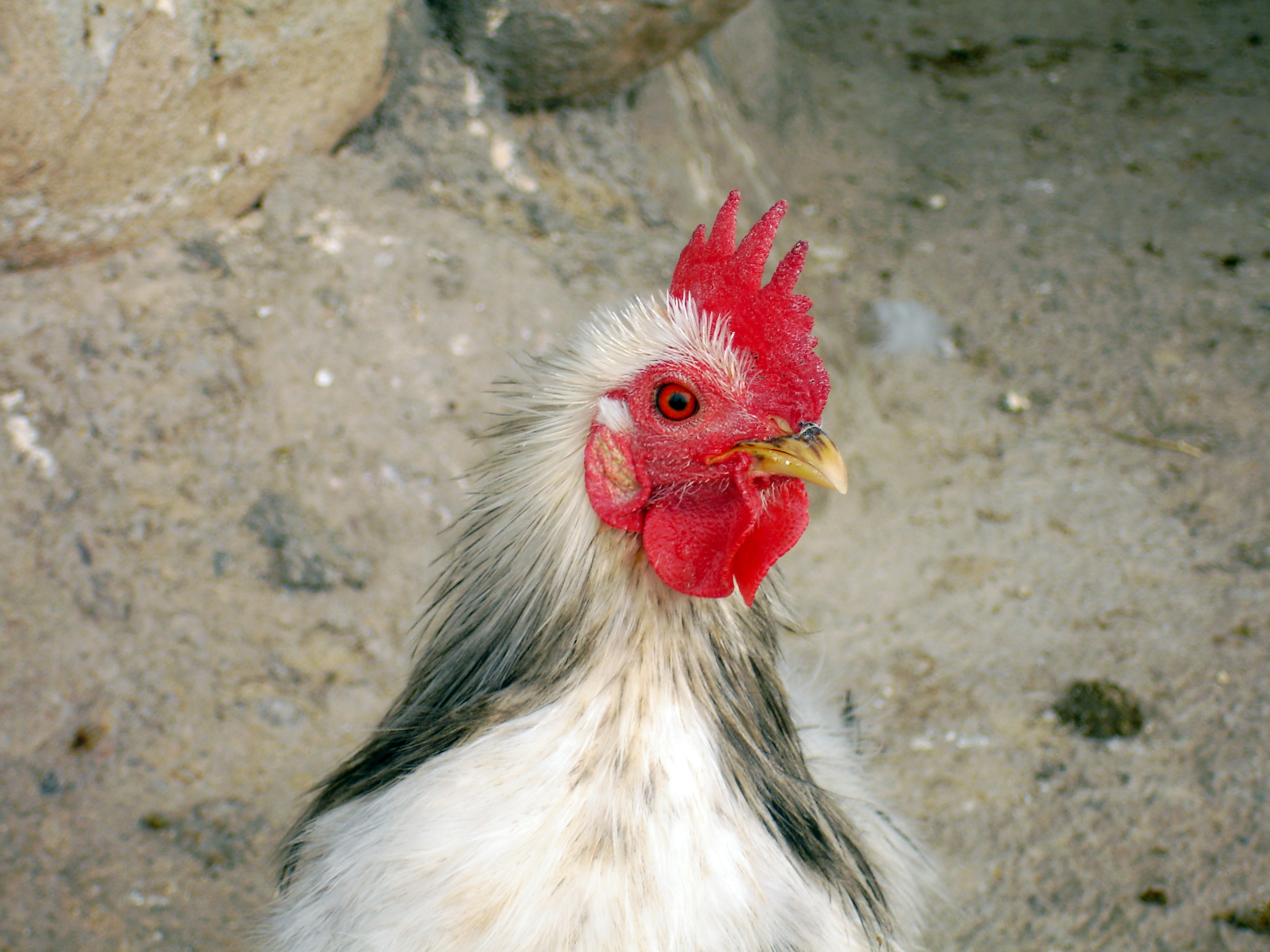

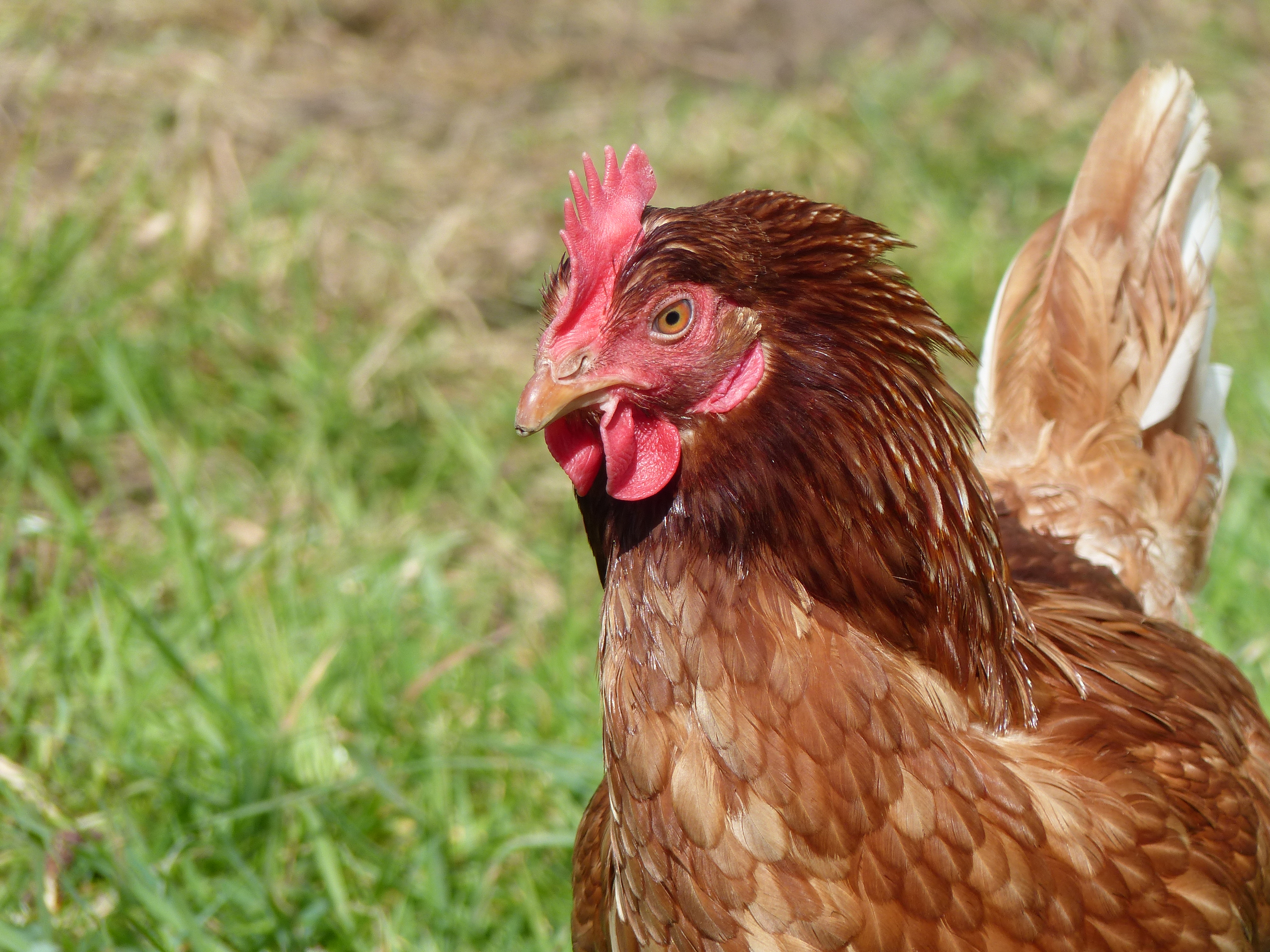
Brown hen

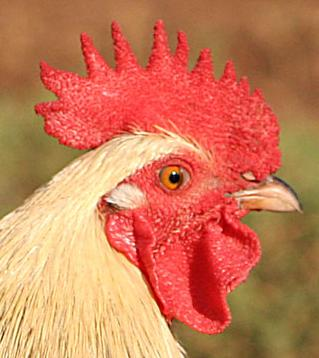

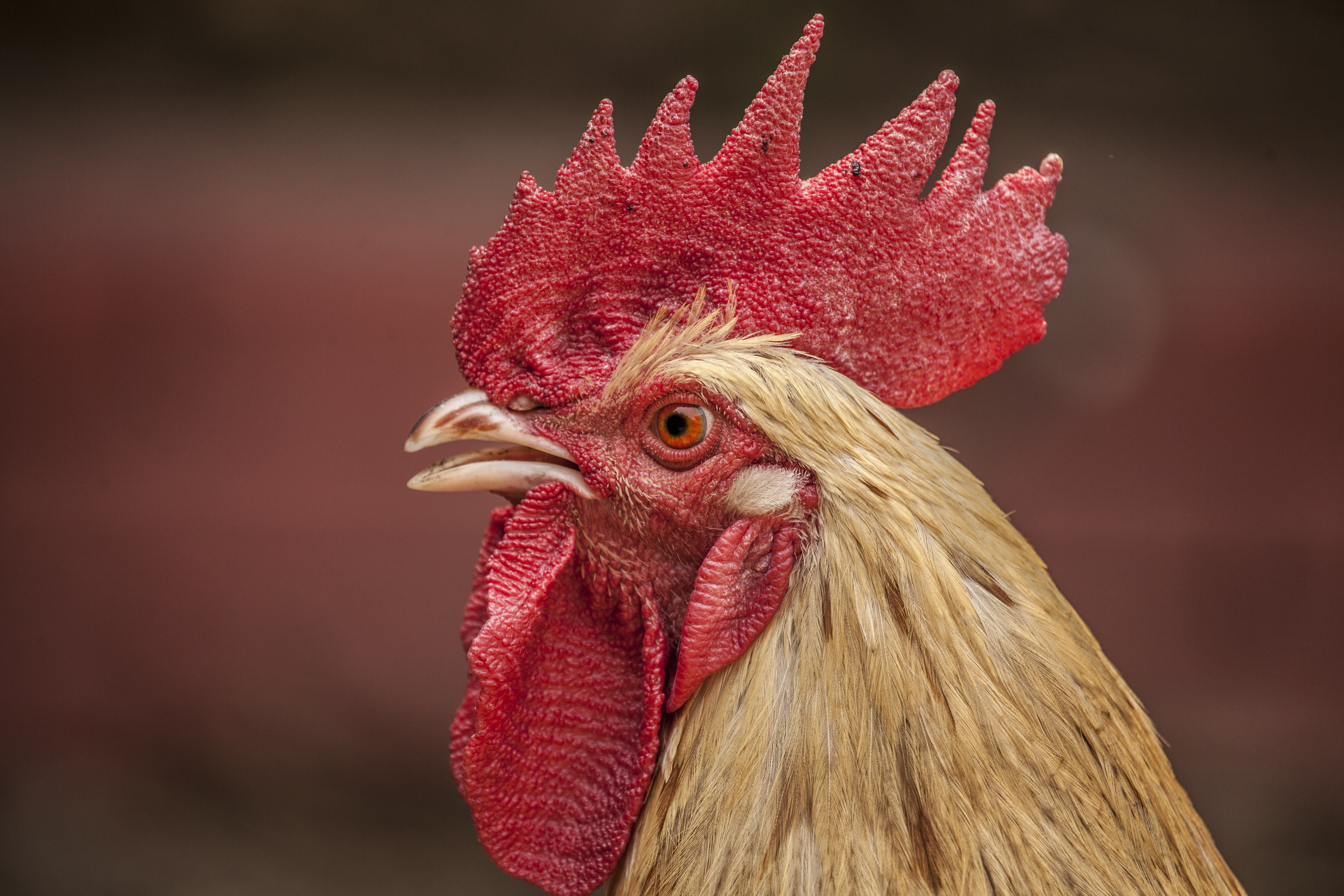

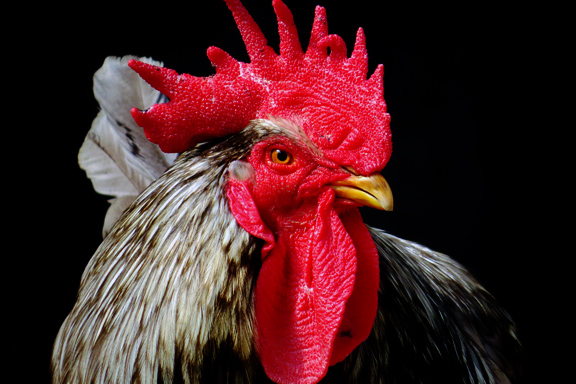

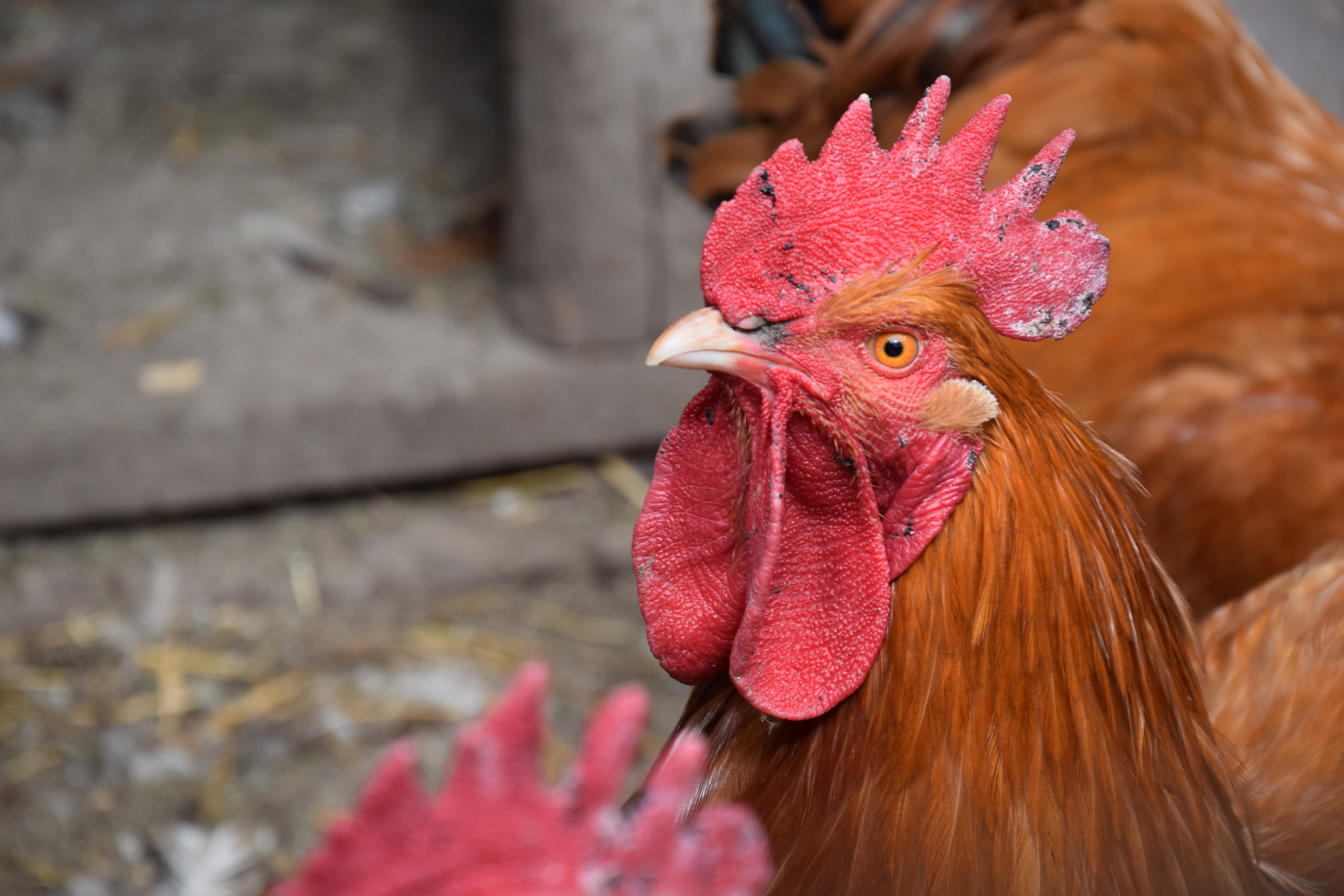

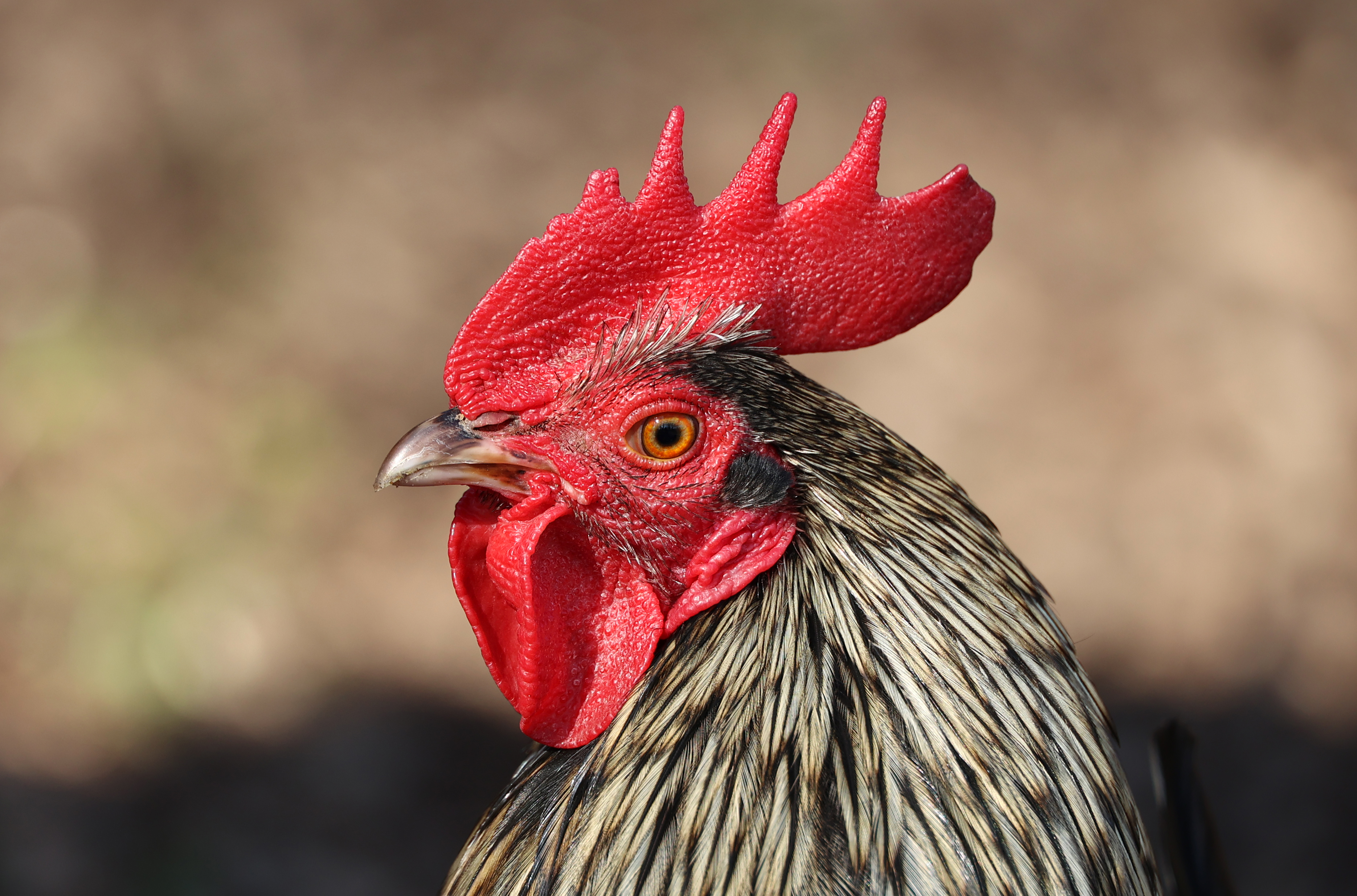

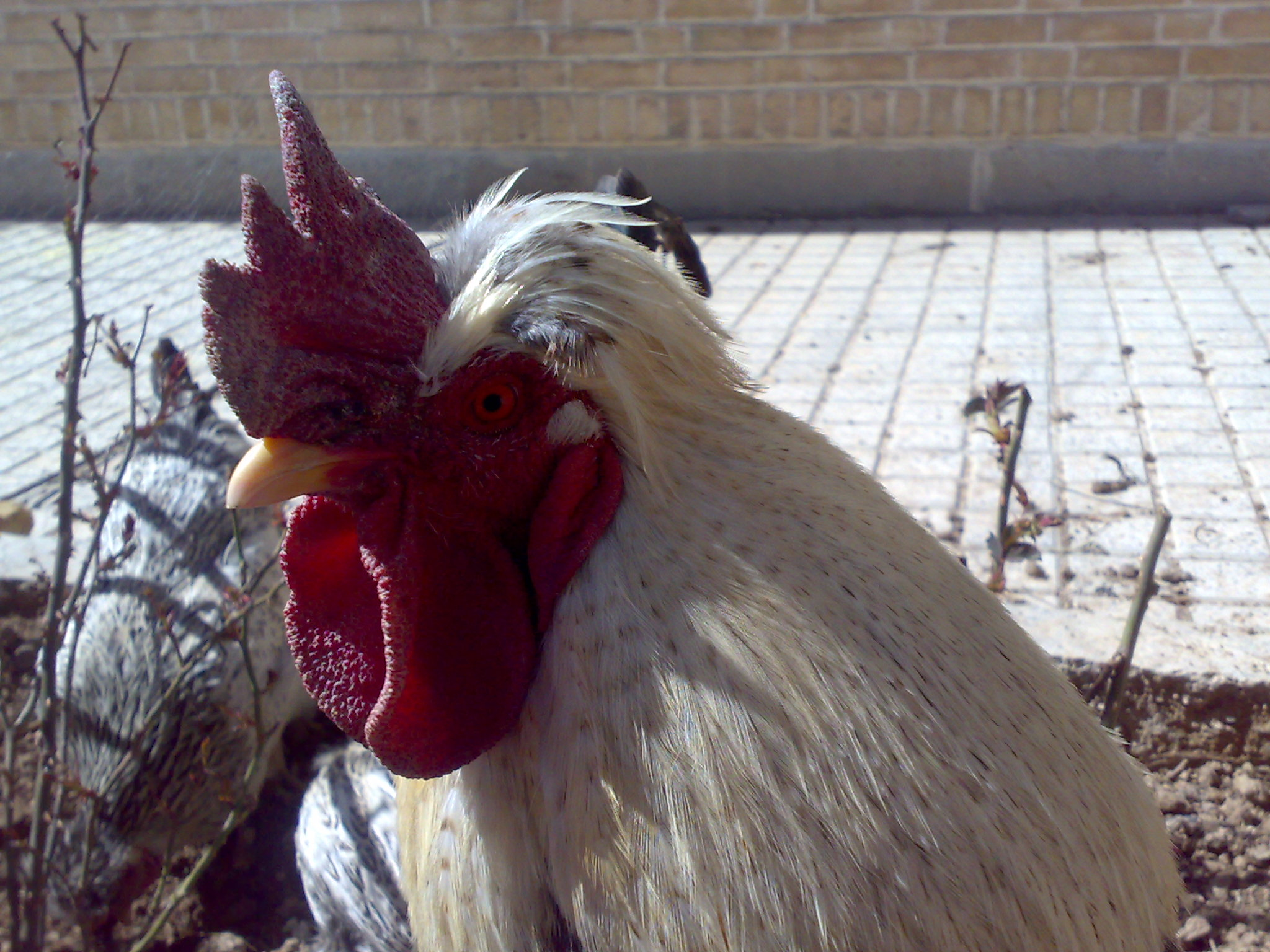

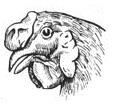

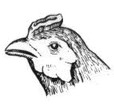

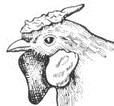

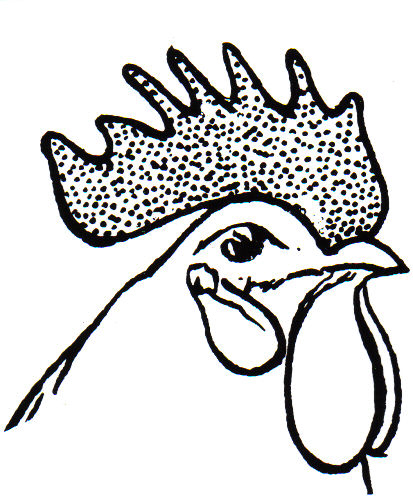

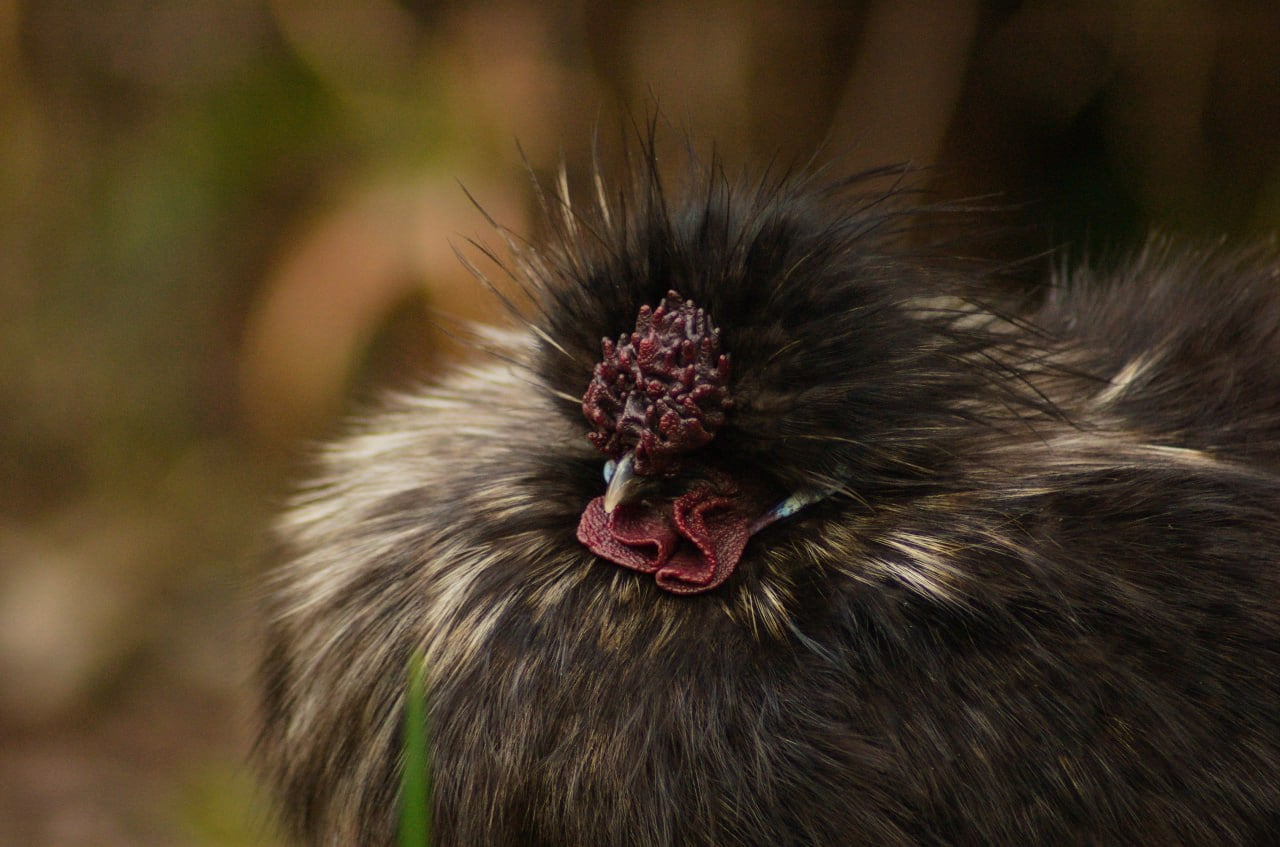
Silkie rooster with purple comb and wattle

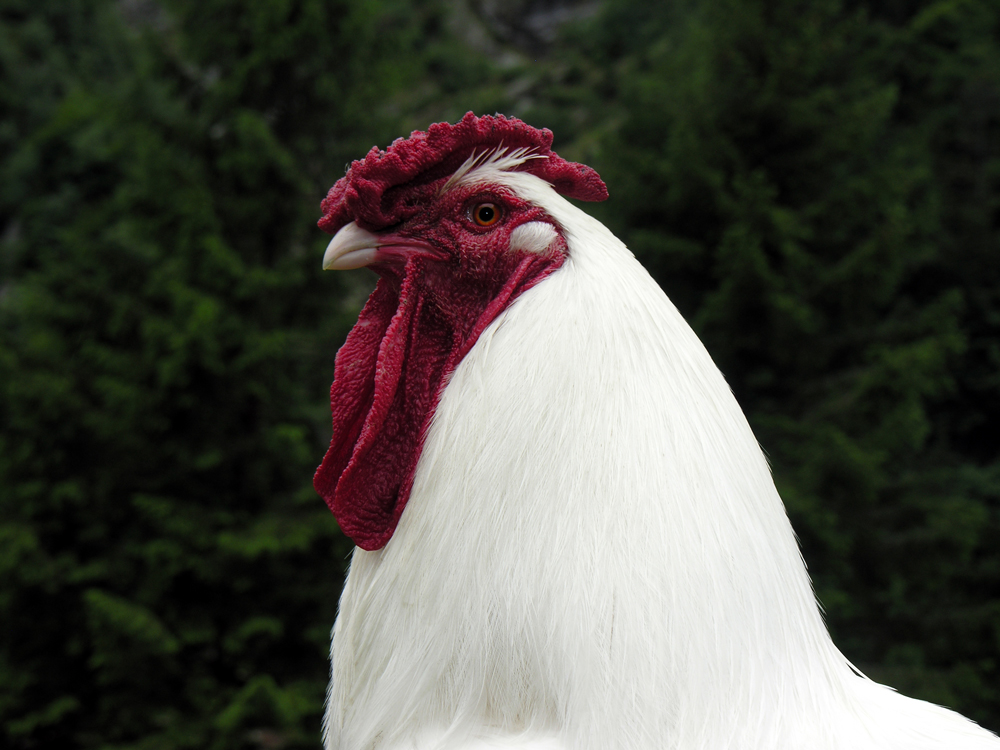
Schweizer rooster with rose comb

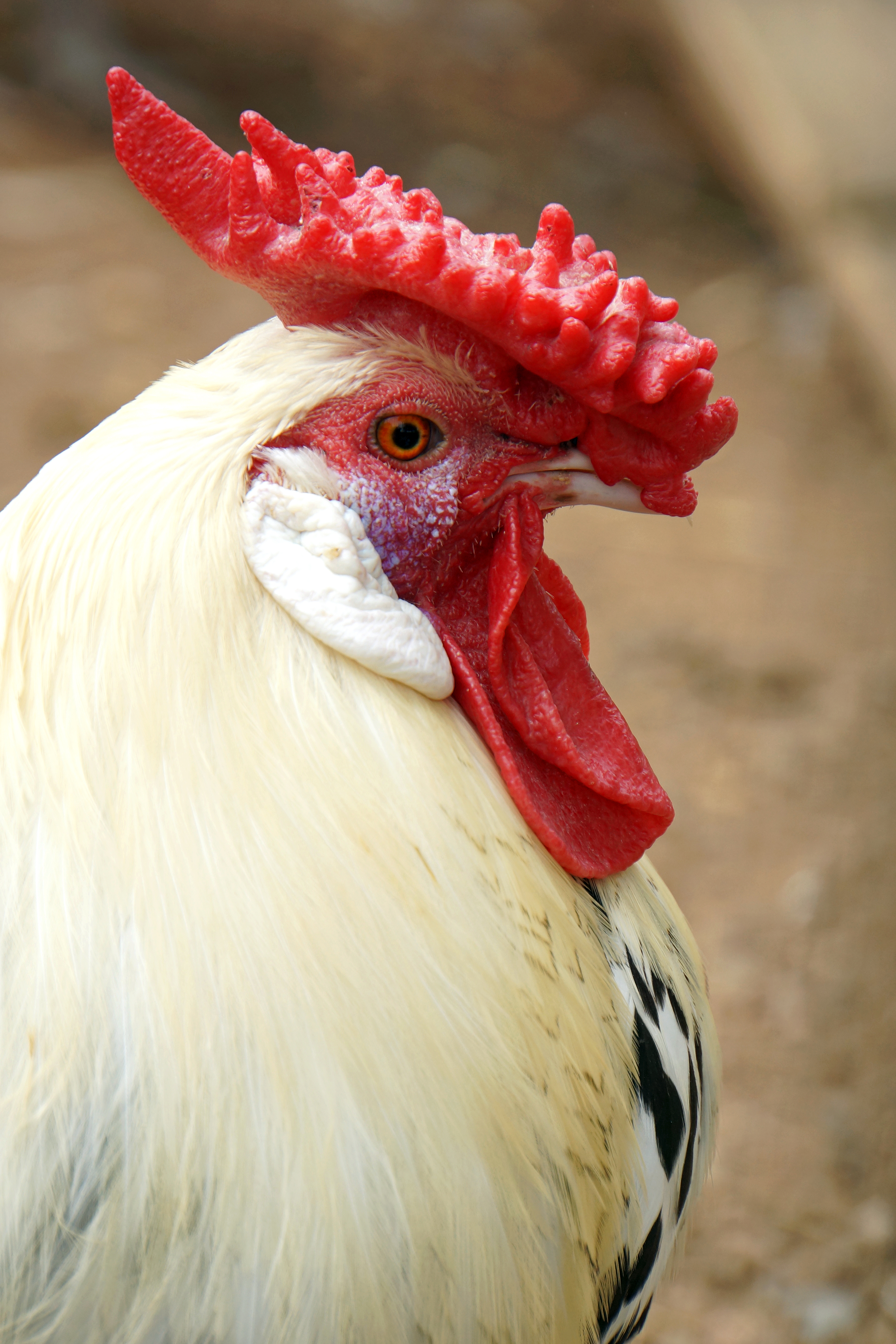
A Hamburg breed cock with rose comb

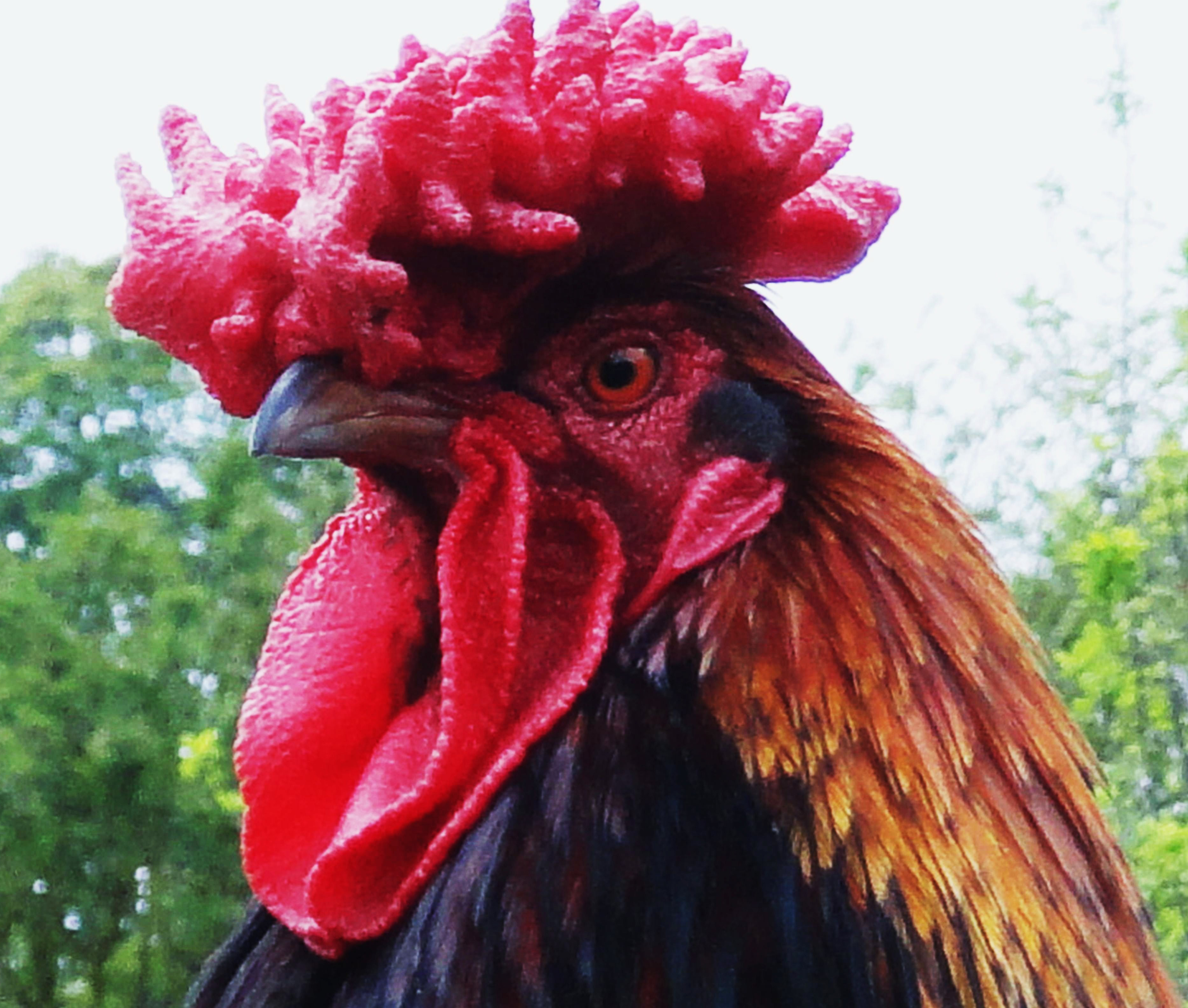

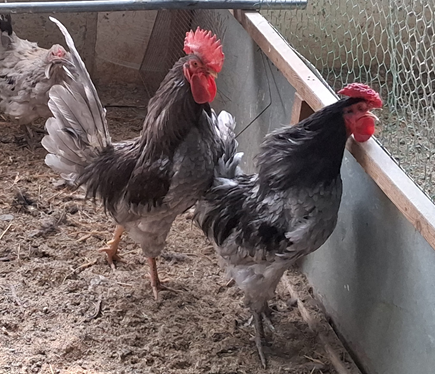
A single combed chunggye cockerel and a rose combed one

== See also ==
- Crest (feathers)
- Dubbing (poultry) – removal of the comb
- Larousse Gastronomique
- Snood (anatomy)
- Wattle (anatomy)
