= Crèvecœur chicken =

French breed of chicken

Crèvecœur
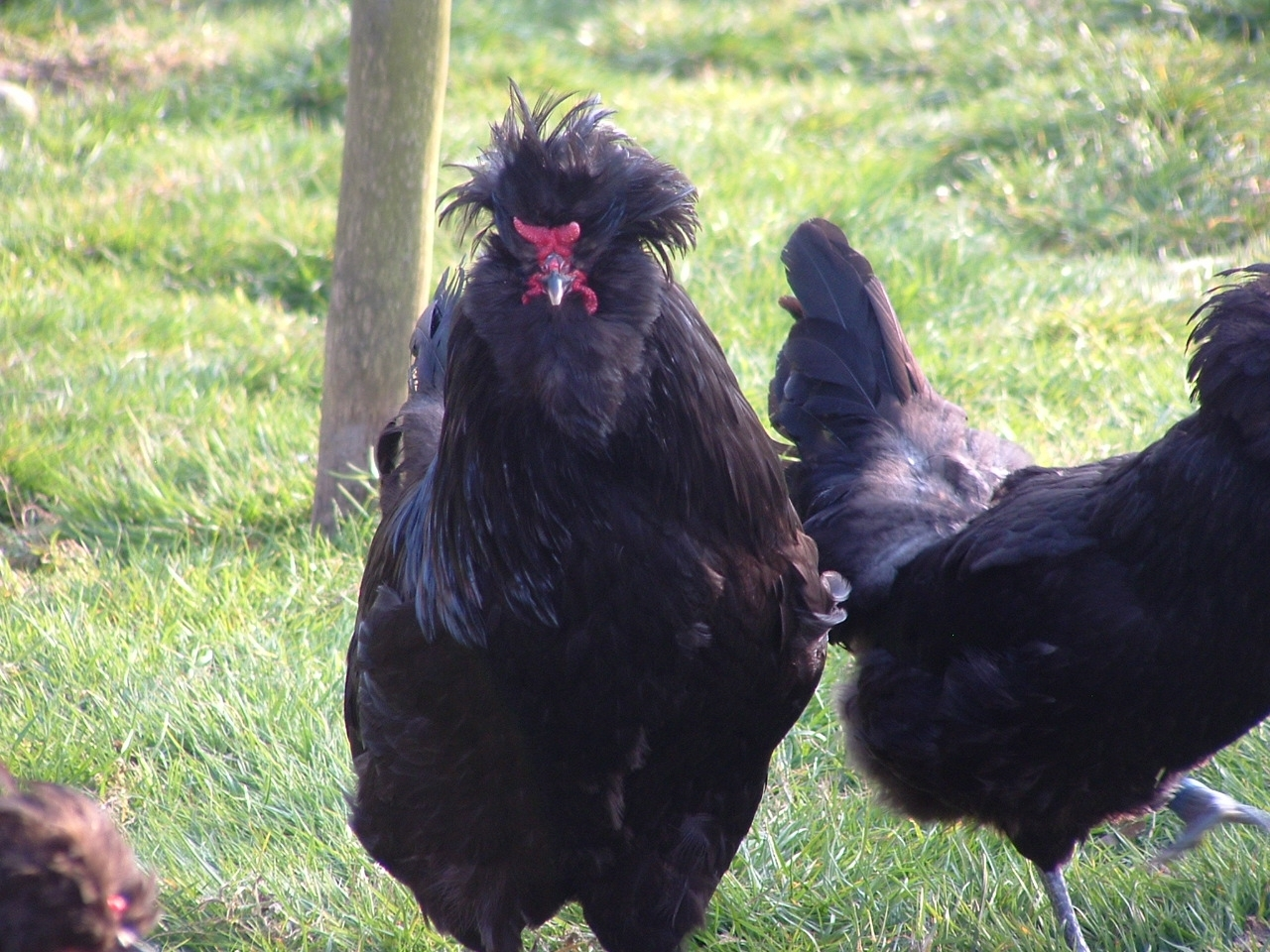
- A black cock (foreground)
- Conservation status: FAO (2007): no data
- Country of origin: France
- Use: dual-purpose, meat and eggs; exhibition

Traits
- Weight: Male: Standard: 3–3.5 kg; Bantam: 1100 g; Female: Standard: 2.5–3 kg; Bantam: 900 g
- Egg colour: white
- Comb type: v-shaped

Classification
- APA: continental
- ABA: all other comb clean legged
- PCGB: rare soft feather: heavy

Notes
- crested breed
- Chicken; Gallus gallus domesticus

The Crèvecœur (French pronunciation: [kʁɛvkœʁ]) is an endangered French breed of crested chicken from the Pays d'Auge, in the Calvados département of Normandy, in north-western France. It is named after the commune of Crèvecœur-en-Auge. It is related to the La Flèche and to other Norman breeds such as the Caumont and Caux and the extinct Pavilly; the Merlerault was formerly considered a sub-type of the Crèvecœur.

== History ==
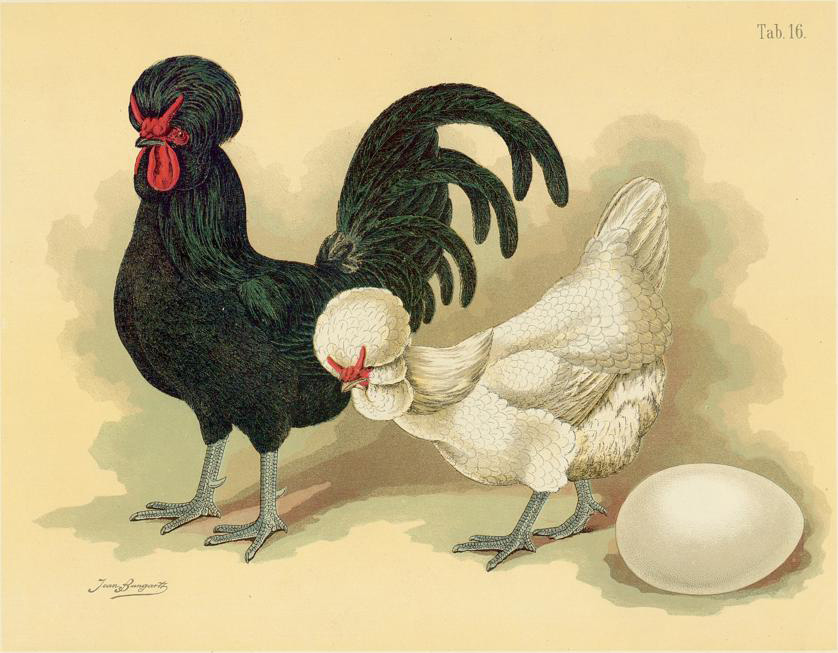
Illustration from the Geflügel-Album of Jean Bungartz, 1885

The Crèvecœur is among the oldest French breeds of chicken; its origins are unknown. It takes its name from the commune of Crèvecœur-en-Auge, near Lisieux in the historic region of the Pays d'Auge, in the Calvados département of Normandy. Crèvecoeur chickens won prizes at the Exposition Universelle of 1855 in Paris. The breed was described in detail by Louis Bréchemin in 1894, but the breed standard was not accepted by the Société d'Aviculture de Basse-Normandie until 1909.

The Crèvecœur was reared in the United Kingdom from the mid-nineteenth century, and was added to the Standard of Perfection of the American Poultry Association in 1874.

The French population of the breed suffered during both the First and Second World Wars; after the latter, it was thought to have virtually disappeared. Recovery was begun in 1976 by Jean-Claude Périquet. In 1995 numbers were reported to be between 100 and 1000 individuals; in 2007 the breed was listed by the Food and Agriculture Organization of the United Nations as "endangered".

Bantam versions were separately developed in the United States from about 1960, and in Germany towards 2000.

== Characteristics ==
The Crèvecœur has a crest similar to that of the Houdan breed. Unlike the Houdan, it is four-toed and has a v-shaped comb like that of the La Flèche.

It is most commonly black, and this is the only colour variant recognised in the United Kingdom and in the United States. Three other colours are recognised in France: blue, white, and cuckoo. The face, comb, ear-lobes and wattles are bright red, the legs and feet slate blue or black. The beak is a dark horn colour, the eyes may be red or sometimes black.

== Use ==
The Crèvecœur was traditionally kept as a dual-purpose chicken, raised both for its eggs and for its meat, which is of high quality. The eggs are white, and weigh about 55 g. In the twenty-first century it is raised primarily for poultry exhibition.
