= Crested chickens =

Group of chicken breeds

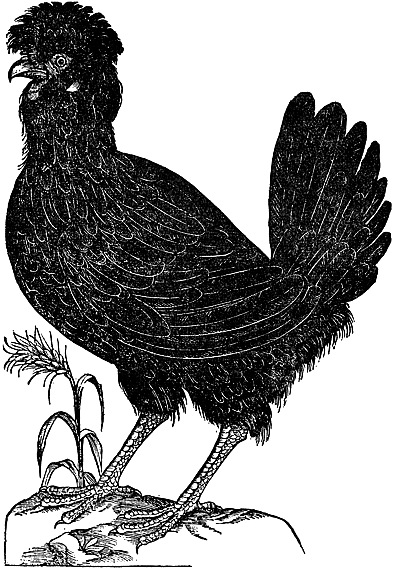
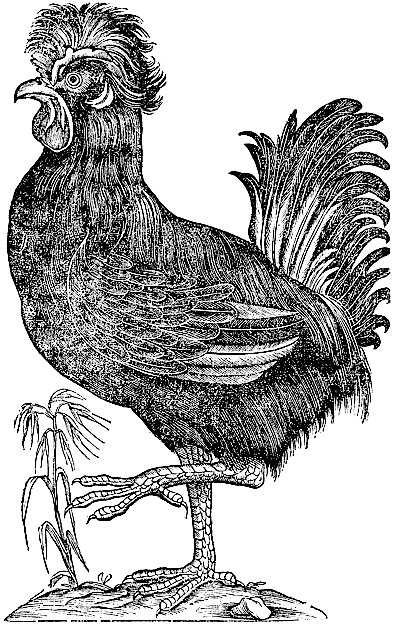
Ulisse Aldrovandi, illustrations of crested hen and cock, from the Ornithologiae tomus alter of 1600

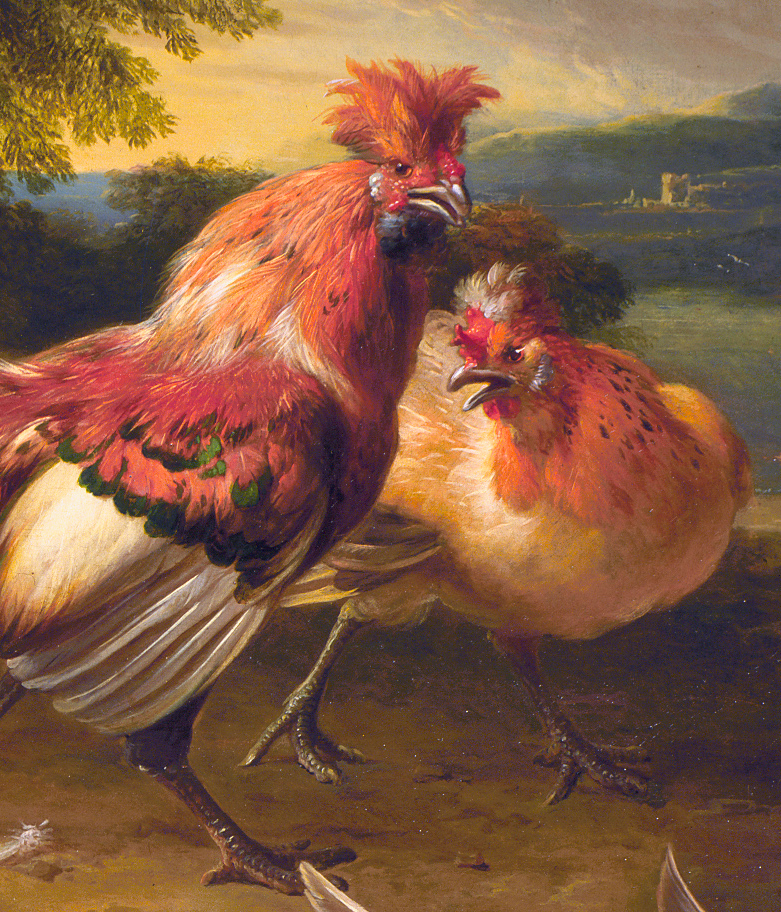
Detail of Kippen en eenden by Melchior d'Hondecoeter, circa 1680

Crested chickens are a group of ornamental chicken breeds characterised by a tuft or crest of upward-pointing feathers on the head.

== History and distribution ==
A skull excavated in England suggests that crested chickens were present there in Roman times. Early depictions of these birds are found in the Ornithologiae tomus alter of Ulisse Aldrovandi of 1600, and in the work of Dutch animalier painters such as Melchior d'Hondecoeter in the later seventeenth century. After the exhibition poultry breeding developed in Europe and North-America in the nineteenth century, several old crested breeds became widely known. Original crested chickens originate from the Netherlands, France, Italy, Poland, Russia, and in the Western Balkans. Apart from these breeds, crested chicken are found in Africa and Iceland.

== Genetics ==
The development of the feather crest is based on the mutation "Crest" (Cr). Its inheritance is incomplete autosomal dominant. This means, that homozygous but also heterozygous animals show a crest, which is however more pronounced in homozygotes.

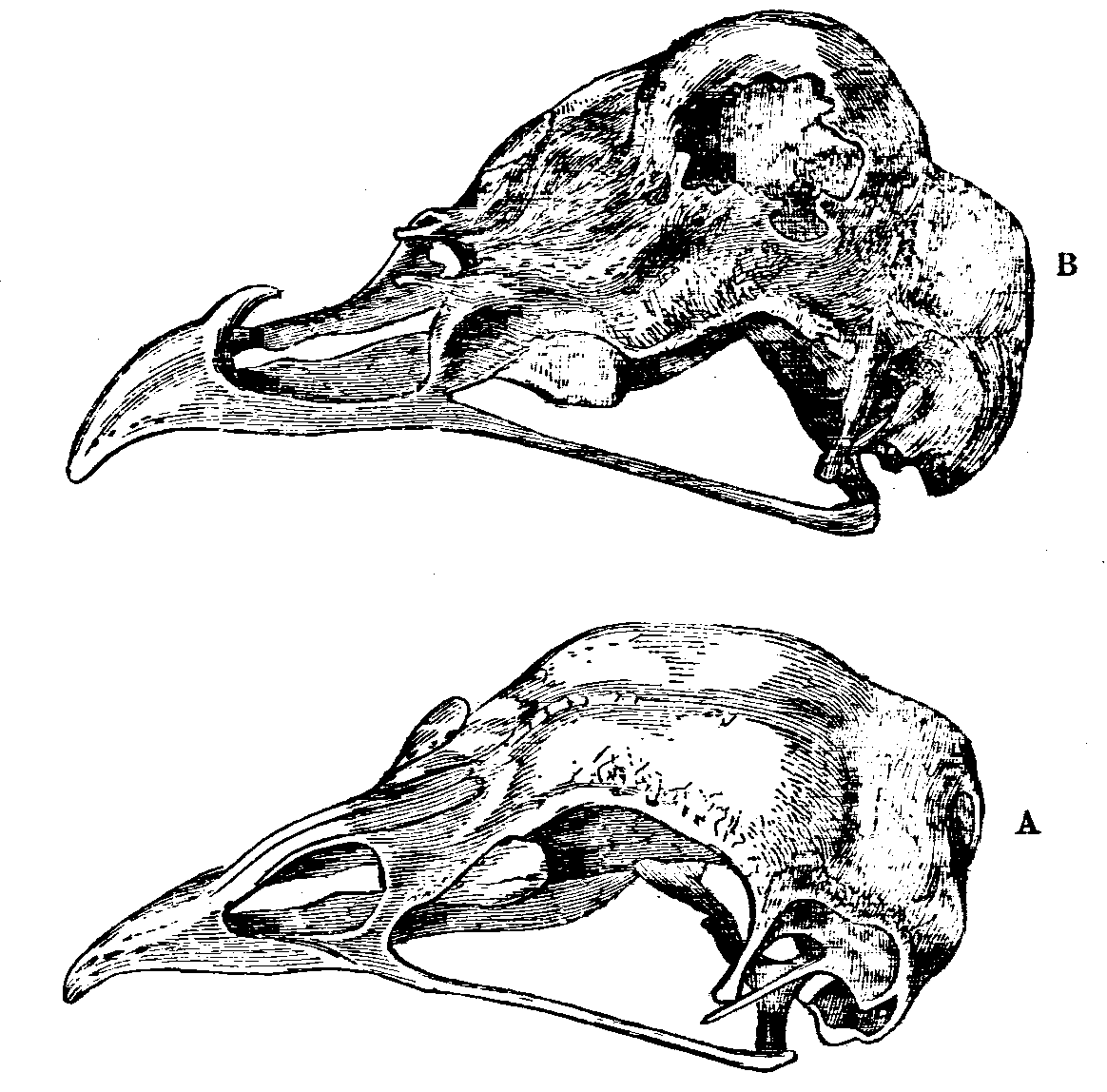
Skull form of a crested chicken (B) and of a bankiva (A)

== Vaulted skull ==
The extreme upright stand of the head feathers of many breeds, like the Polish, can be attributed to a skull malformation, which is known as cerebral hernia or vaulted skull. Neurobiological investigations showed that this malformation alters the brain anatomy without any functional relevance.

== List of crested chicken breeds ==
- Annaberger Haubenstrupphuhn
- Appenzeller Spitzhauben
- Brabanter
- Kraienkopp
- Burma
- Crèvecœur

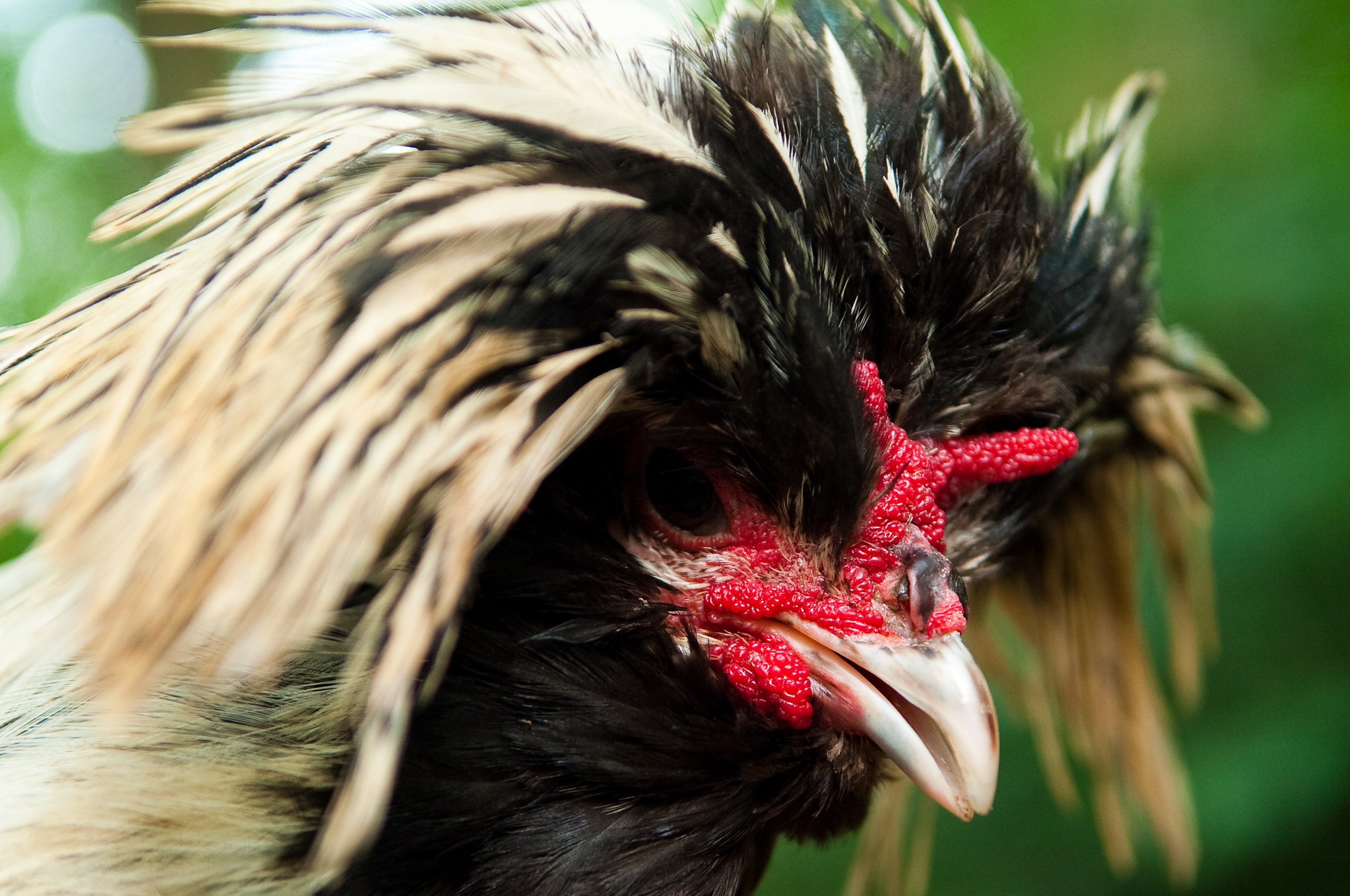
Dutch crested chicken or Polish

- Dutch Crested or "Polish"
- Houdan
- Kosova Long-crowing
- Nederlandse uilebaard
- Padovana
- Pavlovskaya
- Polverara
- Posavska kukmasta kokoš
- Sultan
- Ukrainian Crested
