= La Flèche chicken =

French breed of chicken

La Flèche
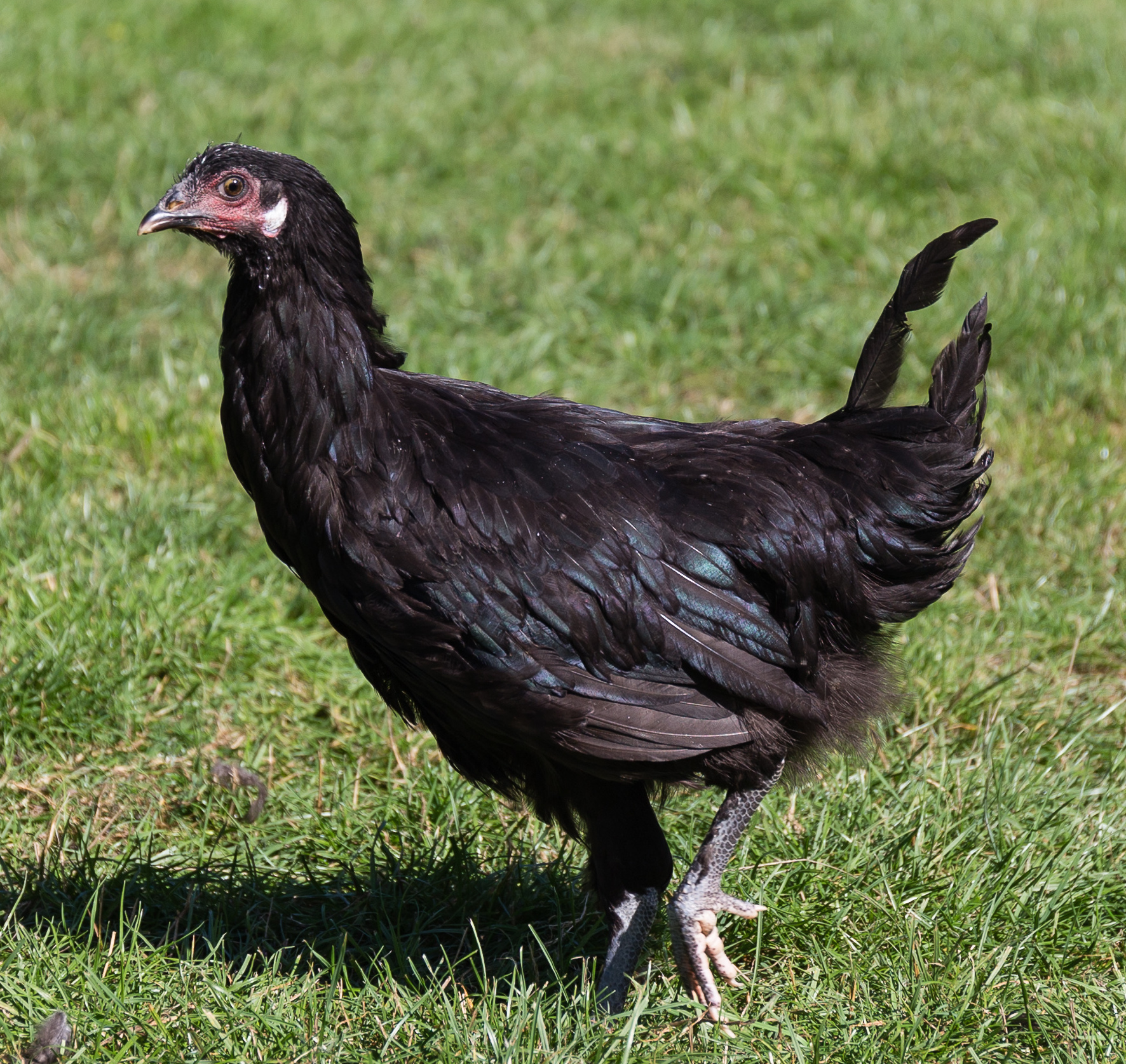
- Hen at the Écomusée du pays de Rennes
- Conservation status: FAO (2007): no data
- Other names: French: Poule de La Flèche
- Standard: France (in French)
- Use: dual-purpose

Traits
- Weight: Male: Standard: 3.5–4 kg; Bantam: 900 g; Female: Standard: 3–3.5 kg; Bantam: 800 g
- Skin colour: white
- Comb type: two vertical spikes

Classification
- APA: continental
- ABA: clean legged
- PCGB: rare soft feather: heavy
- Chicken; Gallus gallus domesticus

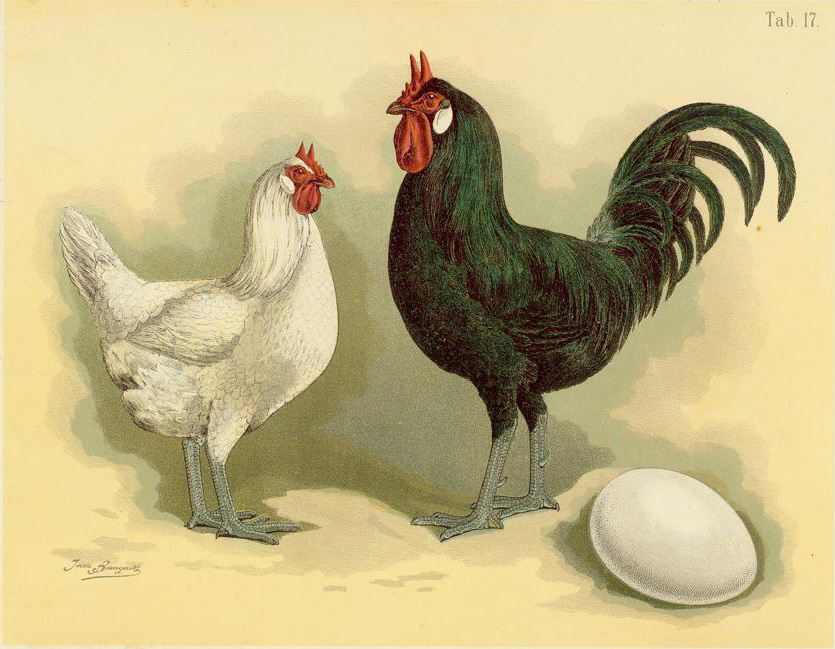
La Flèche cock and hen by Jean Bungartz (Geflügel-Album, 1885)

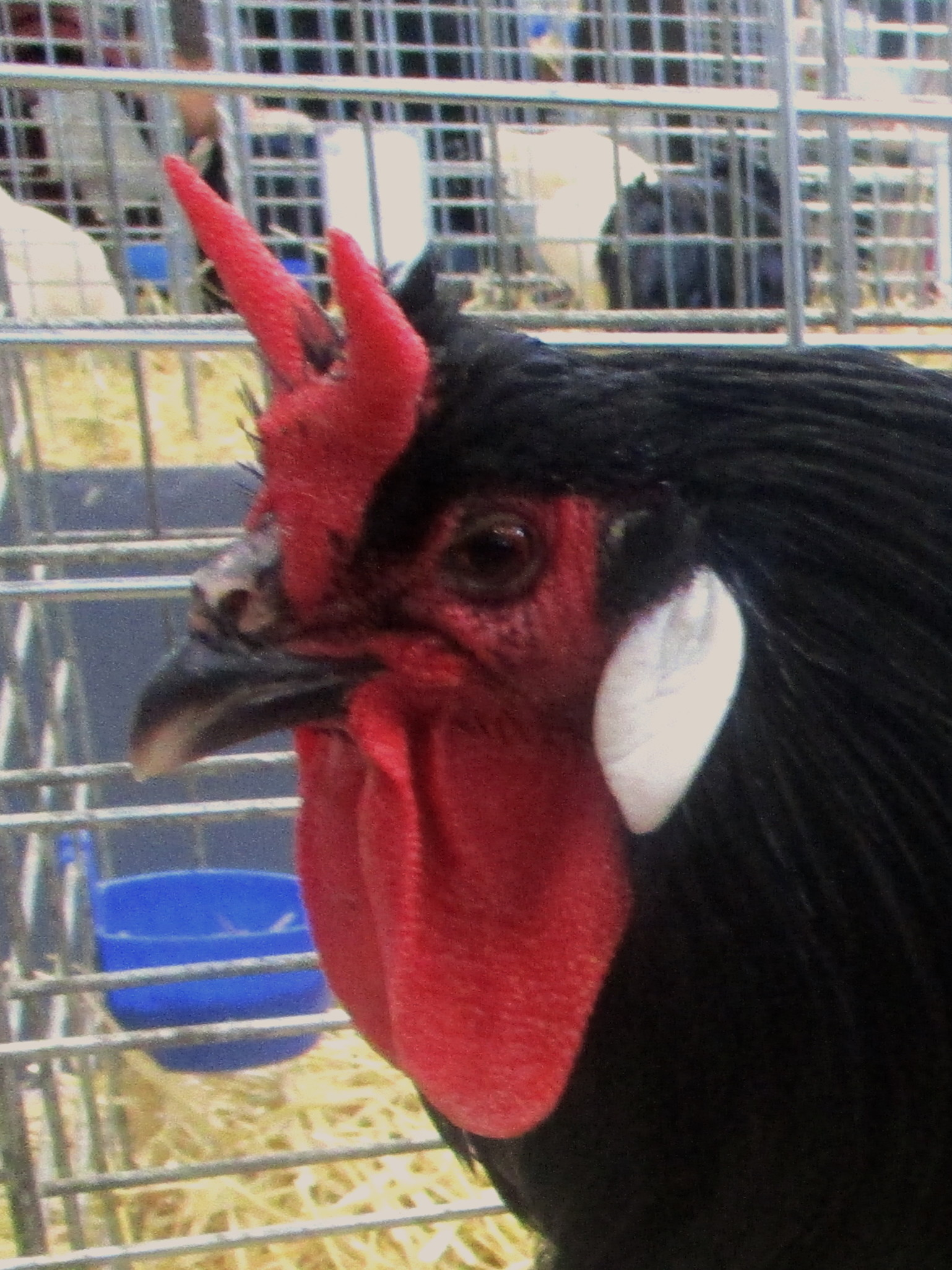
Head of a cock, showing the characteristic comb

The La Flèche, French: Poule de La Flèche, (Note: pronounced [pul də la flɛʃ])) is a rare French breed of dual-purpose domestic chicken. It originates from the département of the Sarthe, in the Pays de la Loire region, and is named for the town and commune of La Flèche in that area, not far from the capital of the Sarthe, Le Mans. The breed was once famous for the fine quality of its meat; since the Second World War, numbers have fallen very low.

== History ==
Many authors date the origins of the La Flèche breed to the fifteenth century. An early description dates from 1846. The breed enjoyed a period of fame and success in the first part of the twentieth century, but, as with all native French breeds other than the Bresse, numbers fell heavily after the Second World War.

In the 1960s and 1970s it came close to disappearing; there has since been a gradual recovery. In 2011 a rescue project was launched by the Conservatoire des races animales en Pays de la Loire, the regional animal breed conservation body of the Pays de la Loire region.

Some birds were exported to the United States in the 1850s, but were found too delicate for the climate. Some were exported to Germany in about 1860, and others were exported to Britain by William Bernhardt Tegetmeier in 1882.

== Characteristics ==
The La Flèche is of medium size: for large fowl, weights for cocks are usually between 3.5 and 4 kg and for hens between 3 and 3.5 kg; weights for bantams are about 900 g or 1000 g and 800 g respectively. Ring sizes are 22 mm for cocks and 20 mm for hens in large fowl, and 14 mm and 12 mm respectively in bantams.

Five colour varieties are recognised in the French standard: black, blue-laced, cuckoo, pearl-grey and white; the same five are recognised by the Entente Européenne. The legs and feet are flesh-coloured in the cuckoo and the white, slate-grey in the blue-laced and pearl-grey and dark lead-grey in the black; the beak is dark horn-coloured or black, the eyes dark red or black. The comb is u- or v-shaped; it and the face and wattles are a deep red, while the earlobes are a vivid white.

== Use ==
Hens may lay about 180 white eggs per year, with an average weight of 60 g.
