= Kosovo Longcrower =

Breed of chicken

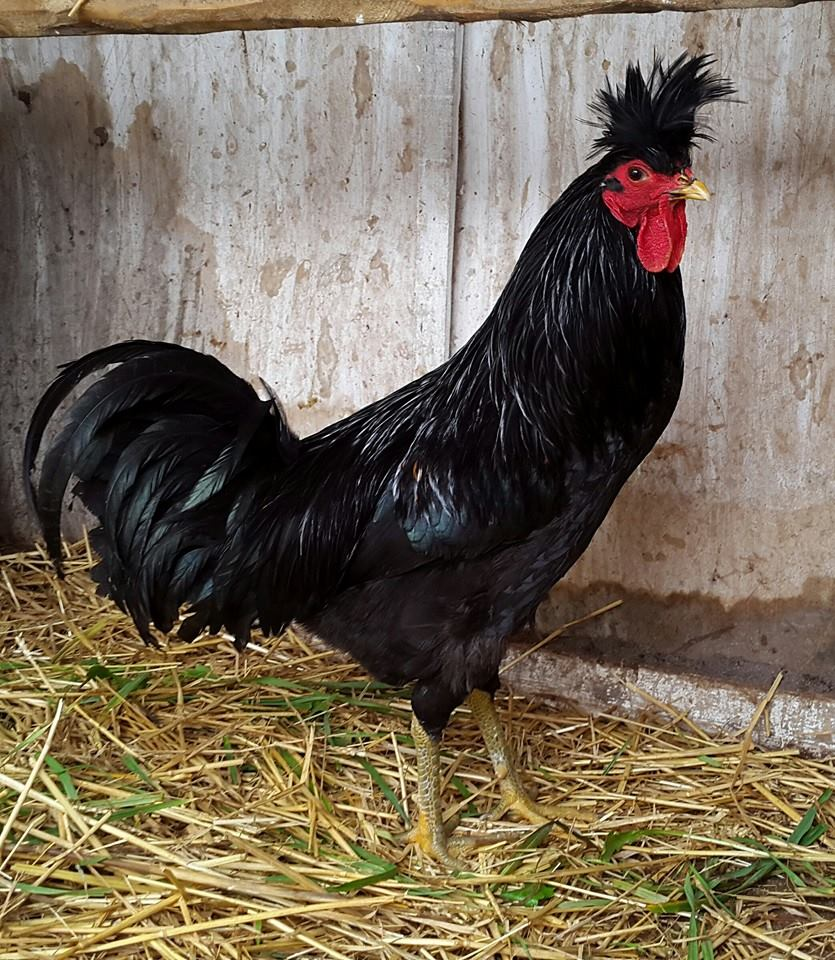
- Cock bird

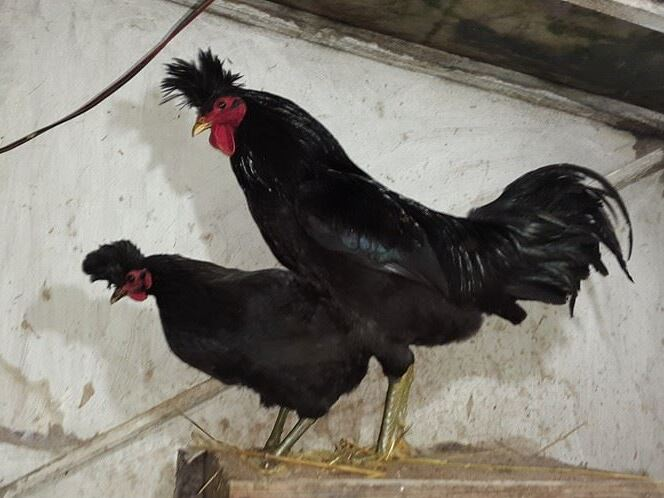
- Cock and hen
- Other names: Serbian Ekavian: Косовски певач / Kosovski pevač, Турски певач / Turski pevač Serbian Ijekavian Косовски пјевач / Kosovski pjevač, Турски пјевач / Turski pjevač Albanian: Pulat e Drenices, Pulat e Prishtinës, Pulat e Gjakoves
- Country of origin: Kosovo

Traits
- Weight: Male: 2–3.25 kg; Female: 1.5–2 kg
- Egg color: white
- Comb type: v comb

Classification
- Chicken; Gallus gallus domesticus

The Kosovo Longcrower or Kosovo Long Crowing Rooster is a breed of chicken originating in Kosovo. It developed as a landrace in the area of the Drenica in Kosovo, and thus in the Albanian language it is commonly called Rooster of Drenica.

== History ==
The breed originated in the region of Kosovo and surrounding areas. Before 2011 it was a rarely kept breed, however it is now widely kept across Europe. Due to its unique feature (long crowing) it became popular between poultry breeders. From Kosovo this breed spread into other Balkan countries as well. Nowadays, it is found in Kosovo, Serbia, Bosnia and Herzegovina, Montenegro, North Macedonia, Croatia, Slovakia, Czech Republic, Austria, Germany, Poland and Sweden.

== Characteristics ==
The birds are black. The cocks might have a few red or gold feathers on the wings. Over time, white spots can occur on its feathers, which is a sign of aging. On the head there is a characteristic crest of black feathers. They possess a V comb. In most cases their crest leans forward. Its beak is yellow (or gold), or even white, whereas the feet are mainly olive-green, as well as gray. The types that have green feet always have a yellow-gold beak, and their song lasts, or even exceeds, 1 minute. The rooster's tail has some longer sword shaped feathers and it is held straight (horizontal with the body).

The cocks weigh 2–3.25 kg and the hens 1.5–2 kg. The hens are non-sitters, and produce 160 white eggs per year of 55–60 g weight. Hens starts to produce eggs when eight months old. Chicks hatch out brown.

== Crow ==
This breed belongs to the group of long-crowing chicken breeds. Their crow averages 20–40 seconds, exceptional birds will go on for 60 seconds. The cocks starts to crow when six to seven months old.
