= Houdan chicken =

French breed of domestic chicken

Houdan
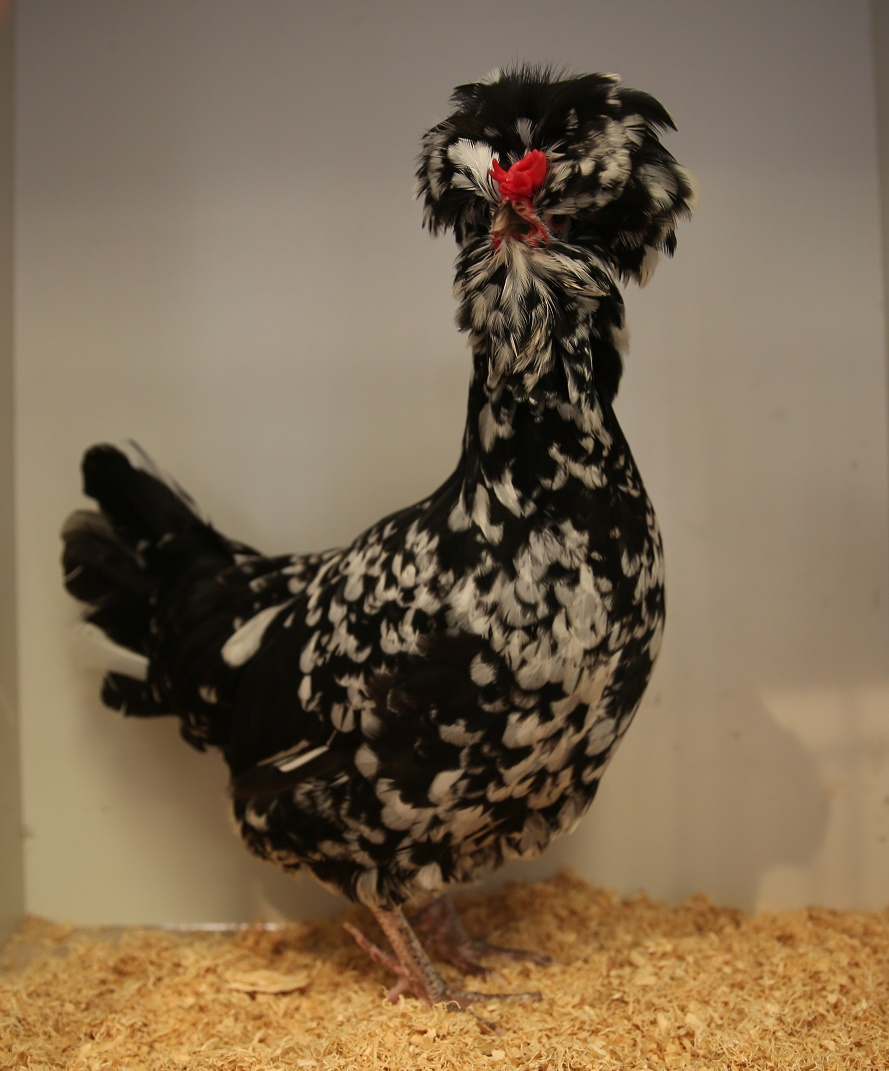
- A black mottled hen
- Other names: Poule de Houdan
- Country of origin: France
- Standard: Large fowl (in French); Bantam (in French)
- Use: meat, eggs, fancy

Traits
- Weight: Male: Standard: 2.5–3 kg; Bantam: 900 g; Female: Standard: 2–2.5 kg; Bantam: 800 g
- Egg colour: white
- Comb type: shaped like a butterfly or oak-leaf; Canada, USA: v-shaped

Classification
- APA: continental
- ABA: all other comb clean legged
- EE: yes
- PCGB: rare soft feather: heavy

Notes
- five-toed
- Chicken; Gallus gallus domesticus

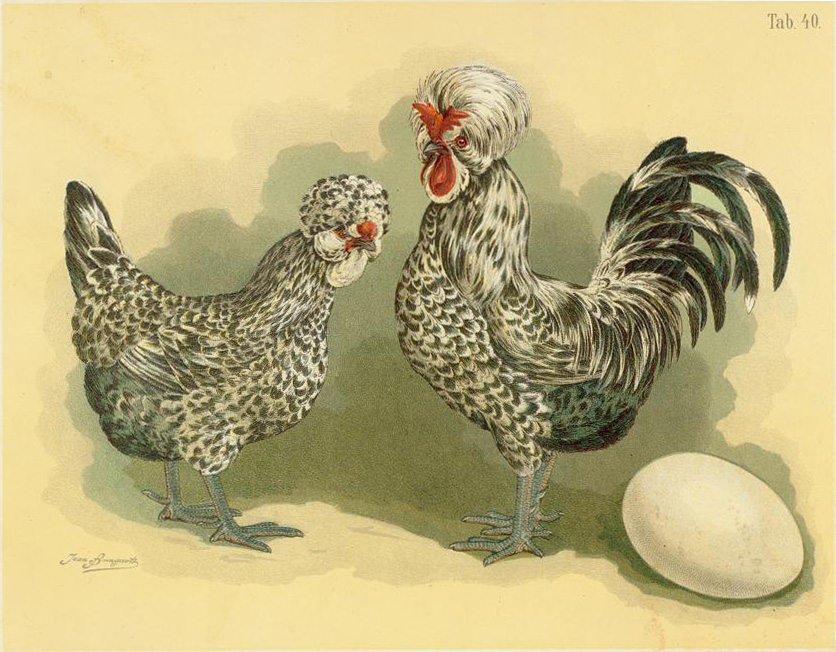
Houdan pair, historic illustration from the Geflügel-Album of Jean Bungartz, 1885

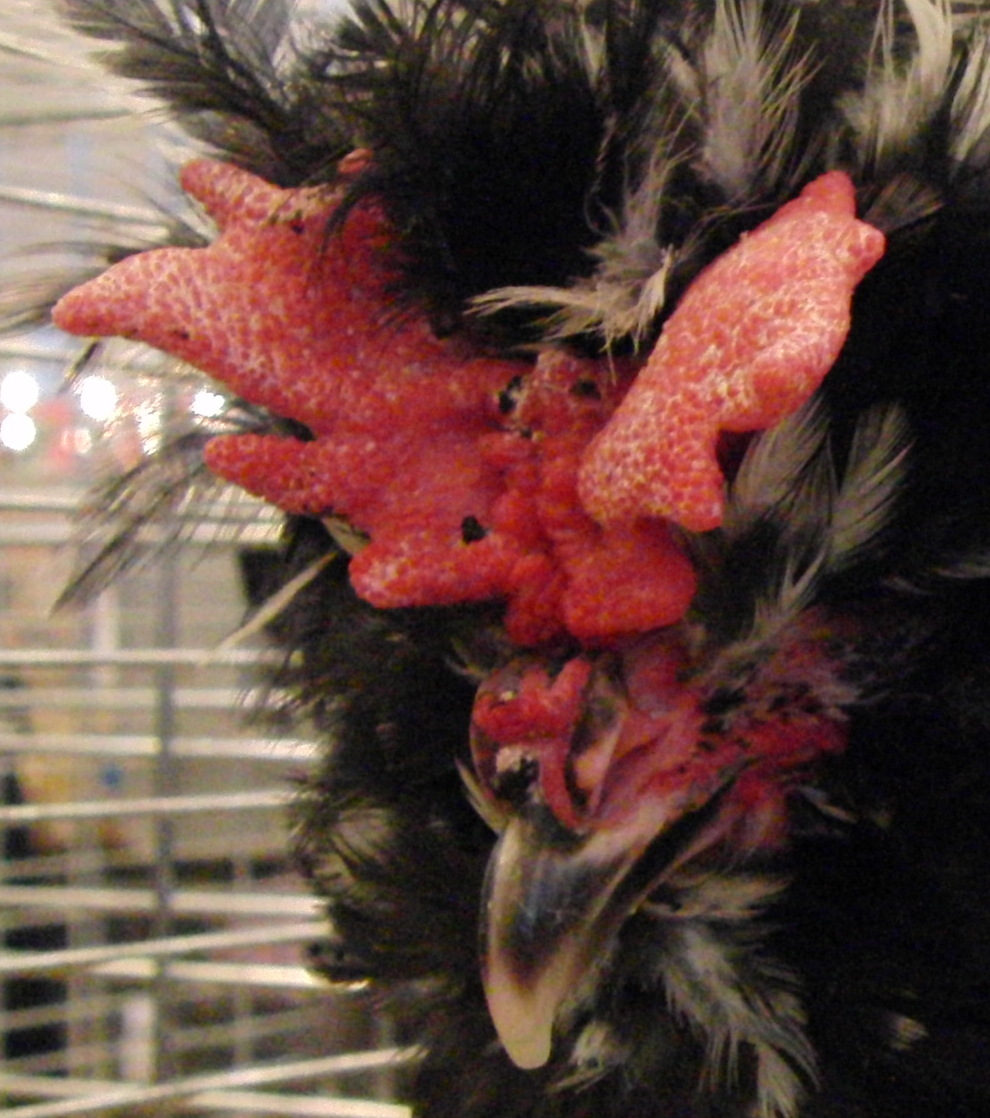
Detail of the head of a cock, showing the characteristic butterfly comb

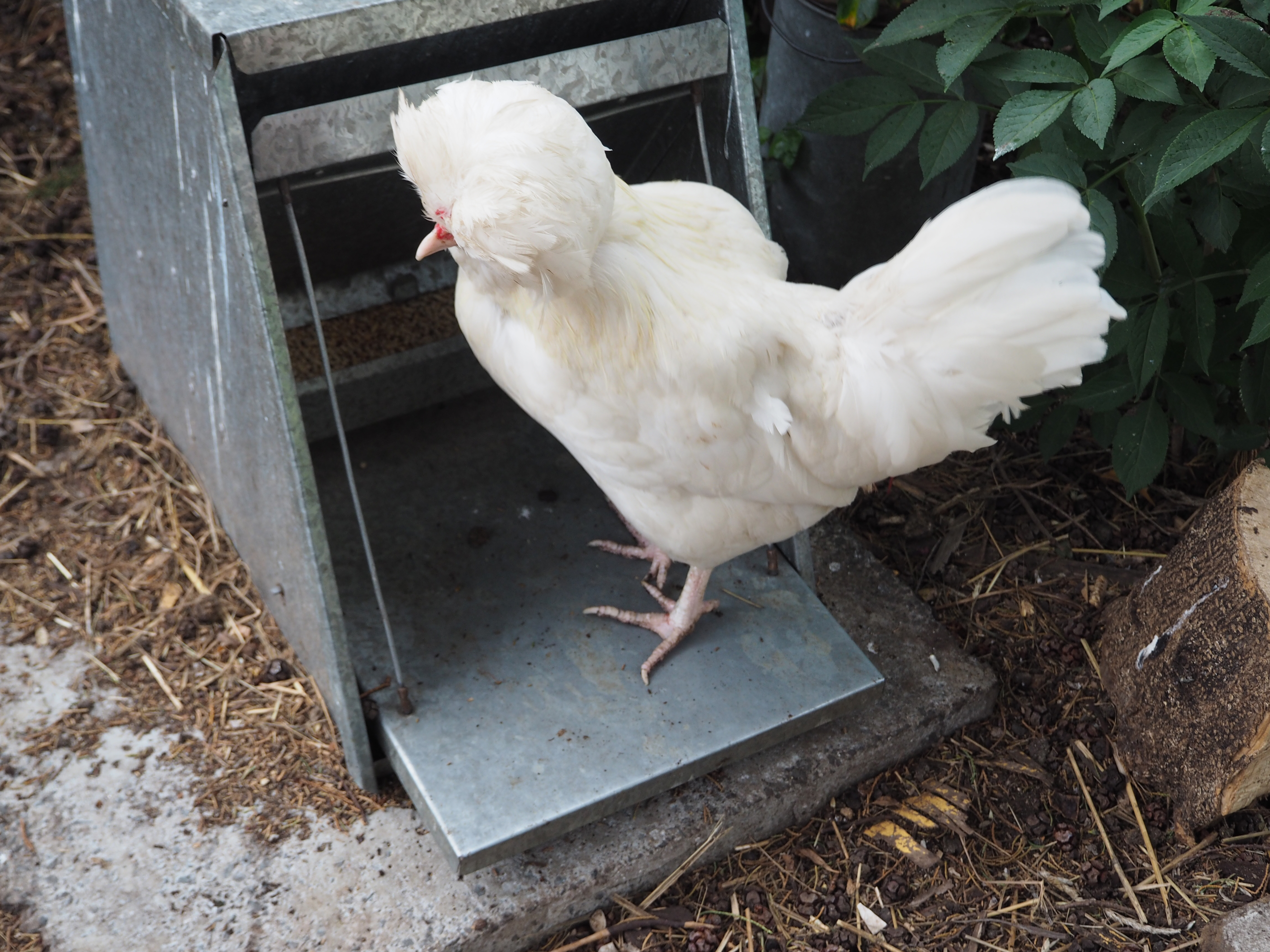
The white

The Houdan (Note: French pronunciation: [udɑ̃]) or Poule de Houdan (Note: French pronunciation: [pul də udɑ̃]) is a French breed of domestic chicken. It is named for its area of origin, the commune of Houdan, in the département of Yvelines to the west of Paris. It belongs to the crested chicken group, is muffed and bearded, has an unusual leaf-shaped comb, and has five toes on each foot rather than the usual four.

== History ==
The Houdan is a traditional French breed; its origins are unknown. It was described in detail by Charles Jacque in 1856 and 1858. The Houdan combines a number of distinctive features, which in the nineteenth century gave rise to speculation about the breeds that might have contributed to its development; the Crèvecœur, Dorking and Poland have been mentioned as possible "ancestors".

It was first imported into England in 1850, and to North America in 1865, where it appeared in the first edition of the American Standard of Perfection in 1874.

A bantam Houdan was created in Britain shortly after the end of the Second World War, and developed further in Germany and in France.

== Characteristics ==
The Houdan is crested, muffed and bearded, has an unusual leaf-shaped comb, and has five toes on each foot rather than the usual four. The earlobes and wattles are small, and may be mostly or completely hidden by the feathering. The comb is leaf- or butterfly-shaped in European and Australian standards; in the United States it is v-shaped.

The most common colour variety, and the only one recognised in the United Kingdom, is mottled (or caillouté, "pebbled" in France), a pattern of black with white spotting. In the past there was a lighter variation of the mottled pattern; in the 1800s, it may have been more similar to the splashy mixture of white and black which today is called exchequer. Three other colour varieties are recognised in France: black, pearl-grey, and white. In the Poultry Standard for Europe of the Entente Européenne d'Aviculture et de Cuniculture the black mottled, cuckoo, pearl-grey and white are recognised; a black variety is listed but unrecognised. The white variety was developed in the United States. Other colours were known in the past, including blue mottled and red.

Although it is classified by the Poultry Club of Great Britain as heavy, the Houdan is a light breed: in large fowl, cocks weigh 2.5–3 kg and hens 2–2.5 kg; bantams weigh up to 1100 g and 900 g respectively.

== Use ==
The Houdan was formerly a dual-purpose fowl, kept for both eggs and meat: for part of the nineteenth century it was one of the principal meat breeds of France. In the twenty-first century it is an endangered breed, and is reared primarily for showing.

Standard-sized hens may give some 140–160 eggs per year; they are white, and weigh on average 53 g. Bantam hens may be expected to lay about 120 eggs per year, with a median weight of 35 g.
