= Sultan chicken =

Turkish breed of chicken

Sultan
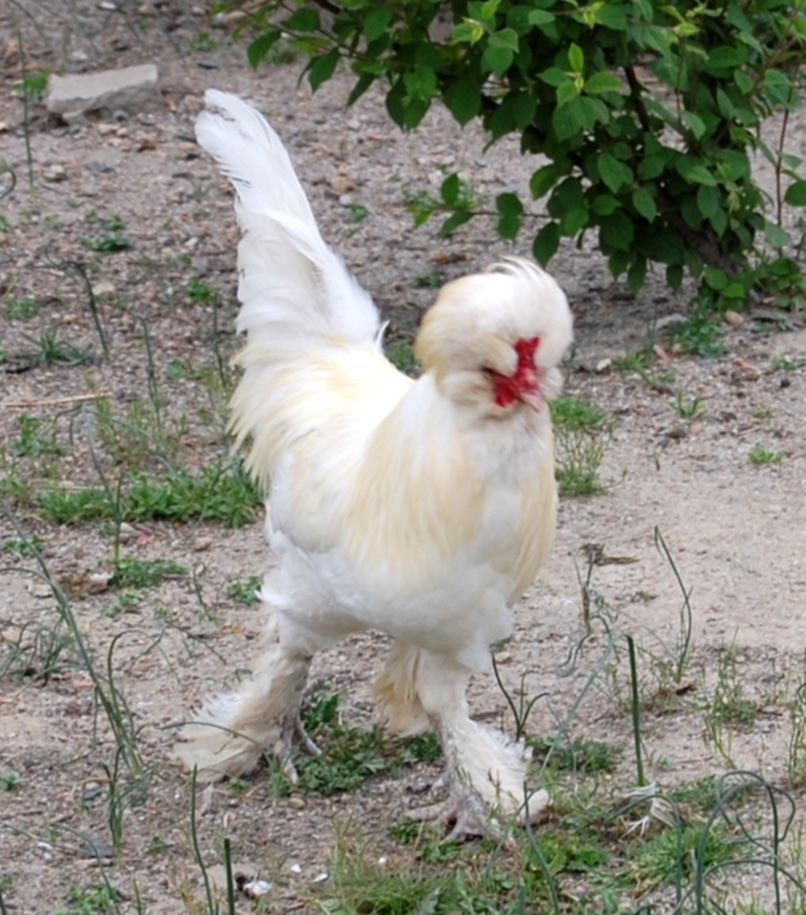

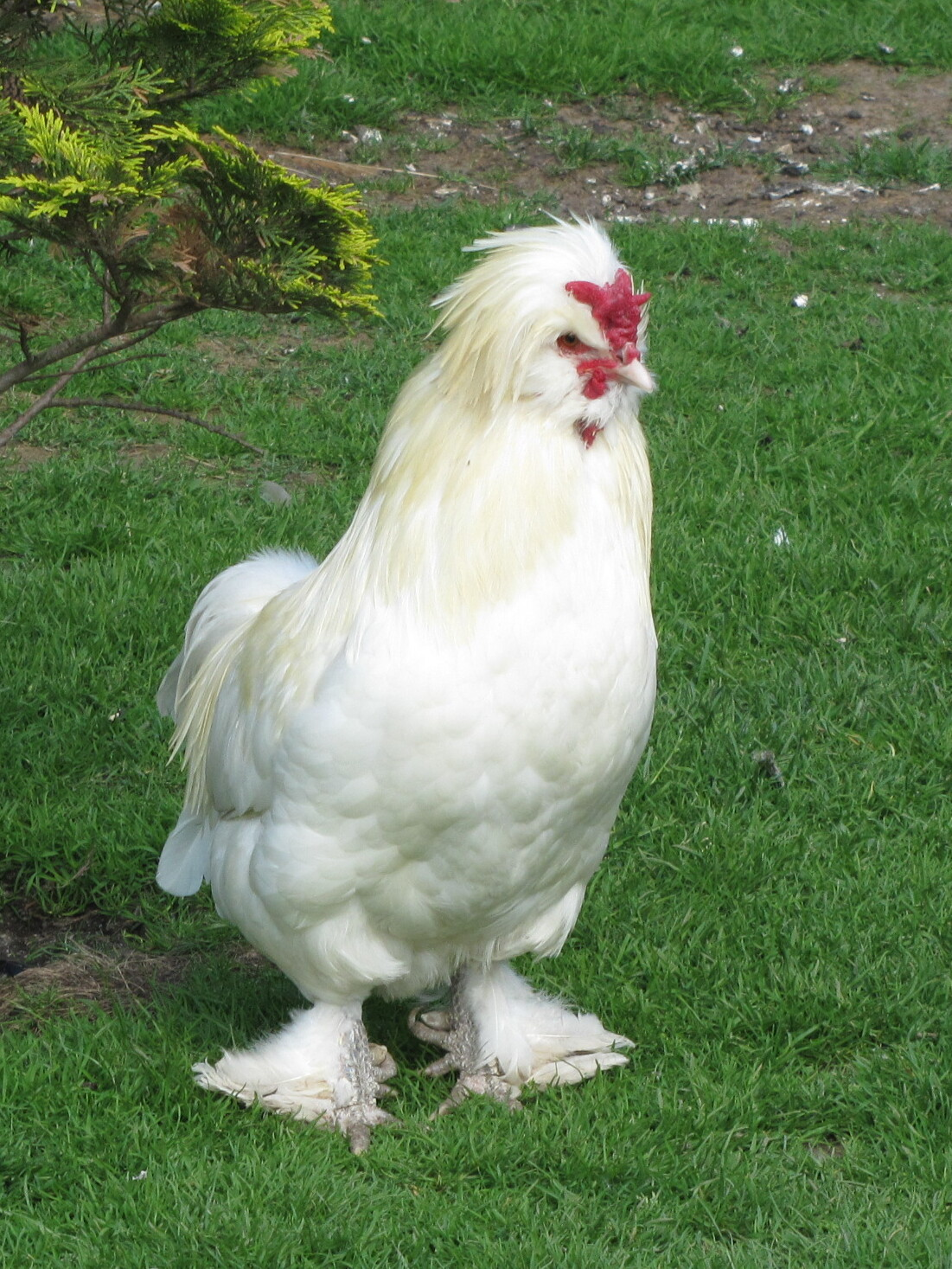
- Conservation status: FAO (2007): not at risk; DAD-IS (2026): at risk/critical; RBST (2026): priority; TLC (2026): threatened
- Other names: Sarai-Tavuk; Sarai-Täook
- Country of origin: Turkey
- Distribution: Australia; Ireland; Serbia; United Kingdom; United States

Traits
- Weight: Male: standard: 2.7 kg; bantam: 680–790 g; Female: standard: 2.0 kg; bantam: 510–680 g
- Egg colour: white
- Comb type: v-shaped
- Colour: white

Classification
- APA: all other standard breeds
- EE: yes
- PCGB: rare soft feather: light
- chicken; Gallus gallus domesticus

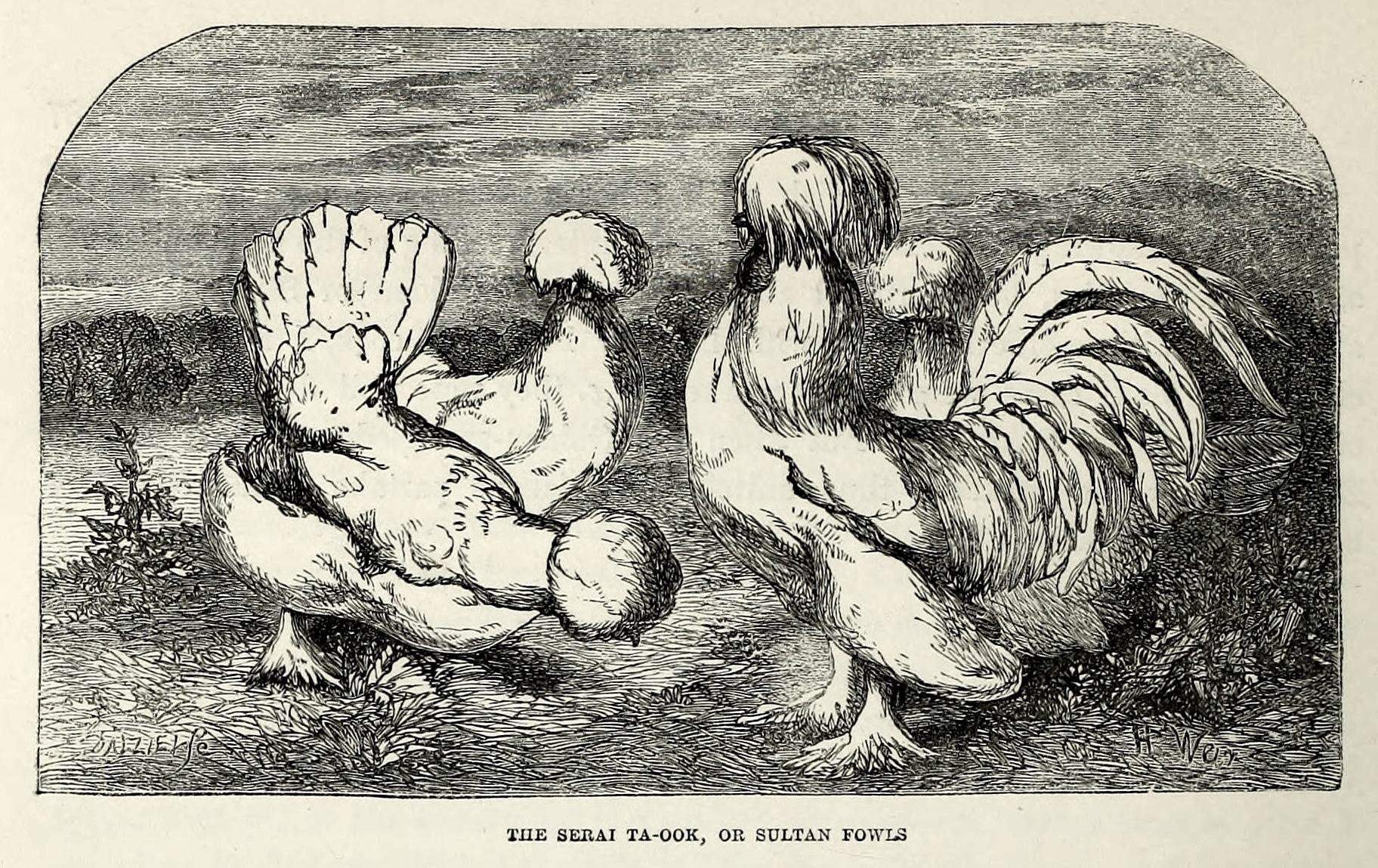
"Sultan Fowls", illustration by Harrison Weir from The Poultry Book, 1867

The Sultan is a Turkish breed of crested chicken. It has several other unusual features: it is bearded, muffed and five-toed, and has a v-shaped comb, heavily-feathered legs and feet, and vulture hocks. The name derives from the original Turkish name of Sarai-Tavuk, 'fowls of the sultan'. Birds of this type were supposedly kept in the gardens of the palace of one of the sultans of the Ottoman Empire. It is rarely seen and is an endangered breed – in 2026 the world population was estimated at 86 birds.

== History ==
The Sultan is believed to have originated in the part of the former Ottoman Empire now known as Turkey; according to legend, birds of this type were kept for ornament in the gardens of the palace of one of the sultans of the Empire.

A small number of the birds were sent from Constantinople in 1854 to the editor of The Poultry Chronicle, Elizabeth Watts of Hampstead in north London; all Sultans in the West descend from this stock. A full description, with an illustration by Harrison Weir, was included in The Poultry Book by William Bernhard Tegetmeier, published in 1867. The Sultan reached North America at about this time, and was included in the Standard of Perfection of the American Poultry Association in 1874; the bantam was added in 1960.

In the twenty-first century it is an endangered breed. It is reported to DAD-IS by six countries – Australia, Ireland, Serbia, Turkey, the United Kingdom and the United States – of which two report population data. In 2024 the number of the birds in Turkey was estimated at 20 to 30, and in 2026 the world population was estimated at 86 birds. Its conservation status was listed as "not at risk" by the Food and Agriculture Organization of the United Nations in 2007; in 2026 it was listed as "priority" by the Rare Breeds Survival Trust of the United Kingdom, as "threatened" by the Livestock Conservancy of the United States, and as "at risk/endangered" in DAD-IS.

== Characteristics ==
The Sultan displays a wide range of unusual features: it is crested, muffed and bearded; it has v-shaped comb, usually visible only in cock birds and hidden by the crest feathers in hens; it has heavy feathering on the shanks and toes, and vulture hocks on the thighs; and it is five-toed.

Only one colour – the white – is recognised by the Poultry Club of Great Britain, the American Poultry Association and the Entente Européenne d’Aviculture et de Cuniculture; the Entente Européenne also lists (but does not recognise) a black variant. The beak, shanks and toes are pale blue or white, and the comb, face, wattles and earlobes are bright red; in hens the comb is often hidden by the crest. The eyes are red.

Weights are variously reported: for large fowl, the Poultry Club of Great Britain gives 2.0 kg for hens and a maximum of 2.7 kg for cocks; the Bund Deutscher Rassegeflügelzüchter gives 1.0 to 1.5 kg for hens and 1.5 to 2.0 kg for cocks. According to the Poultry Club of Great Britain, bantam cocks weigh 680–790 g and bantam hens 510–680 g.

== Use ==
The Sultan is reared only for ornament or for showing – it is not suited to the production of either meat or eggs. Hens do not lay many eggs and have little maternal instinct or tendency to broodiness; they may lay approximately 70 white eggs per year, with a median weight of 53 g.
