= Broodiness =

Behavioral tendency to sit on a clutch of eggs to incubate them

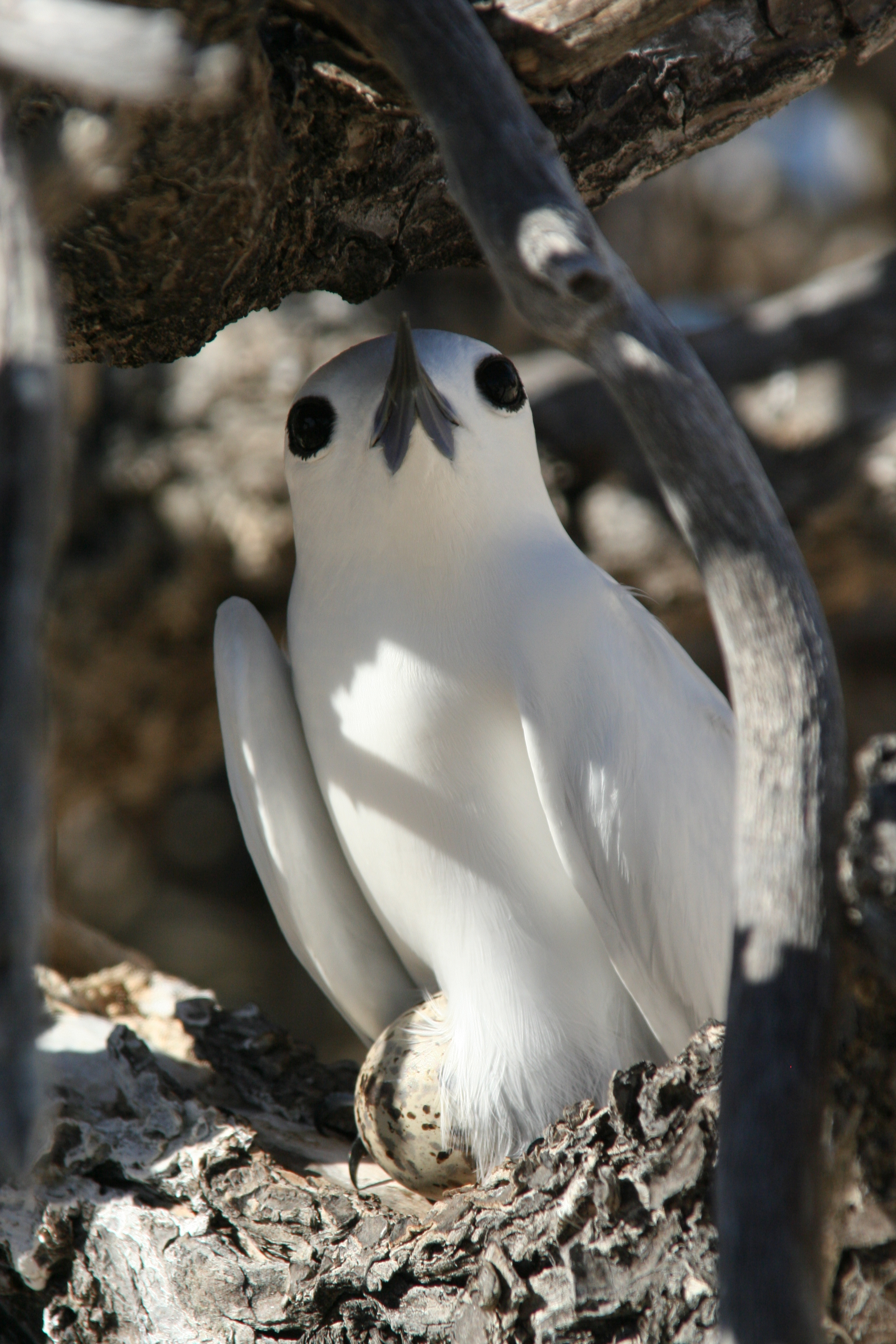
A brooding white tern (Gygis alba).

Broodiness is the action or behavioral tendency to sit on a clutch of eggs to incubate them, often requiring the non-expression of many other behaviors including feeding and drinking. Being broody has been defined as "Being in a state of readiness to brood eggs that is characterized by cessation of laying and by marked changes in behavior and physiology". Broodiness is usually associated with female birds, although males of some bird species become broody and some non-avian animals also show broodiness.

== In wild birds ==
In wild birds, egg incubation is a normal and essential phase in the process of reproduction, and in many families of birds, e.g. pigeons, the eggs are incubated by both male and female parents.

=== Broodiness in males ===
In all species of phalaropes, the males become broody rather than the female. The females leave the nest after finishing laying to let the males incubate the eggs and take care of the young. Male emus (Dromaius novaehollandiae) become broody after their mates start laying, and begin to incubate the eggs before the laying period is complete. Male cassowaries are the ones who brood and raise the chicks, with the females playing no role beyond laying the eggs.

=== Non-broodiness ===
A small number of atypical birds such as Passeriformes of the genus Molothrus (cowbirds) do not become broody but lay their eggs in the nests of other species for incubation, known as brood parasitism. The Australian brushturkey (Alectura lathami) also does not become broody, rather, it covers the eggs with a large mound of vegetable matter, which decomposes, keeping the eggs warm until hatching. The crab-plover (Dromas ardeola), which lives on the coasts and islands of the Indian Ocean, lets its eggs incubate primarily by the heat of the sun, and will leave its nest unattended, occasionally for days at a time.

== In domestic poultry ==
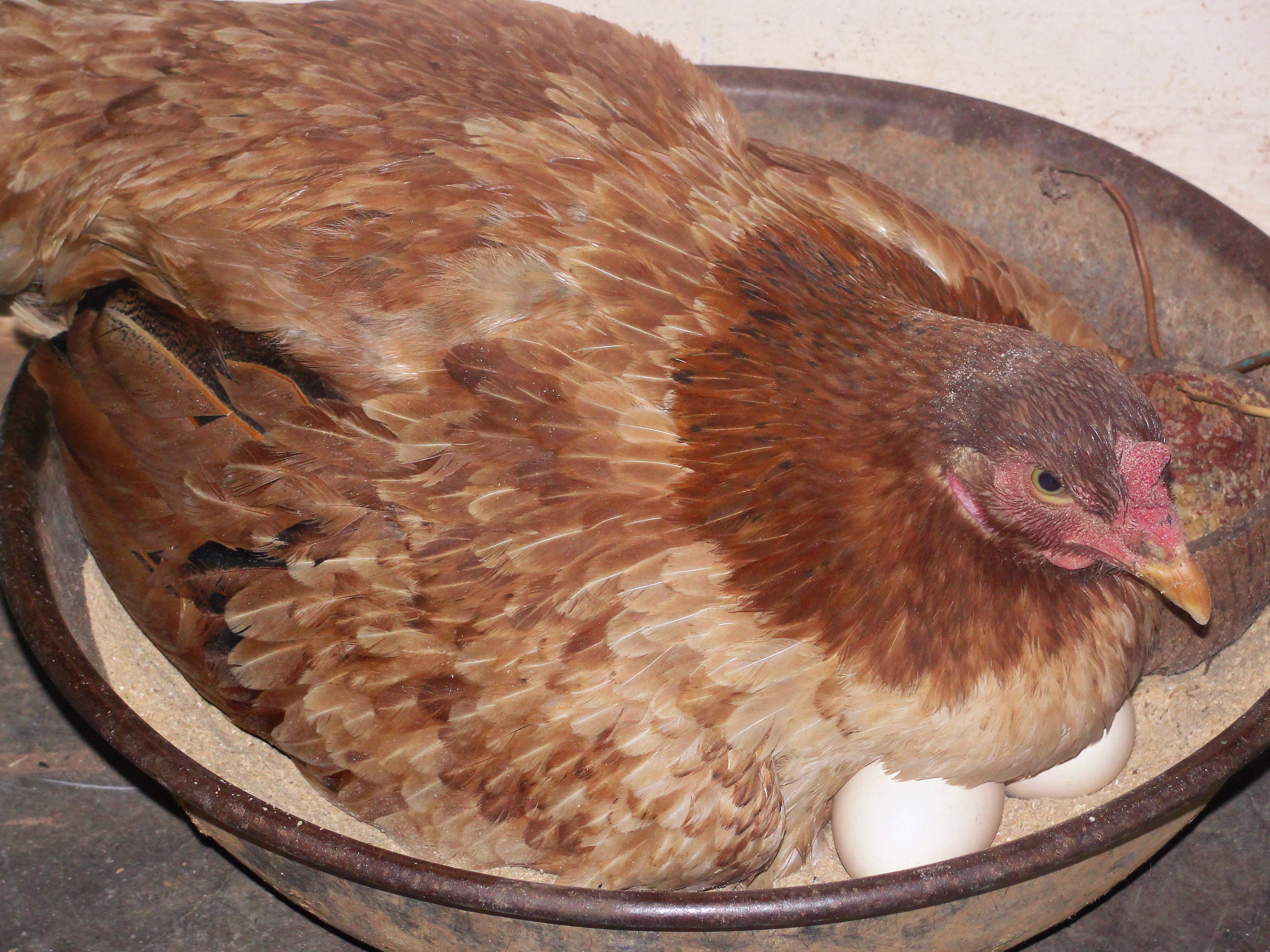
A brooding domestic hen.

Broody hens can be recognized by their behaviour. They sit firmly over the eggs, and when people approach or try to remove the eggs, they threaten the person by erecting their feathers, emitting a characteristic sound like clo-clo-clo and will peck aggressively. When broody, hens often temporarily cease eating or reduce their feed consumption.

Letting eggs accumulate in a relatively dark place near the floor often stimulates hens to become broody. Placing artificial eggs into nests also stimulates broodiness. Keeping hens in dark places with warm temperatures and in view of vocalising orphan chicks can induce broodiness, even in breeds that normally do not go broody.

Some environmental conditions stimulate broodiness. In heavy breeds of chickens, warm weather tends to bring about broodiness. Removing eggs each day, out of the sight of the hens, helps avoid broodiness not only in domestic poultry but also in some wild species in captivity. This continued egg laying means more eggs are laid than would occur under natural conditions. Poultry farming in battery cages also helps to avoid broodiness.

=== In commercial egg-laying ===
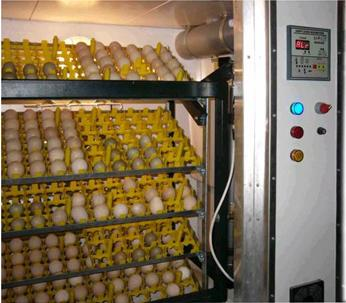
An egg incubator.

Because hens stop laying when they become broody, commercial poultry breeders perceive broodiness as an impediment to egg and poultry meat production. With domestication, it has become more profitable to incubate eggs artificially, while keeping hens in full egg production. To help achieve this, there has been intense artificial selection for non-broodiness in commercial egg laying chickens and parent stock of poultry. As a result of this artificial selection, broodiness has been reduced to very low levels in present-day breeds of commercial fowl, both among egg-laying and meat-producing breeds.

== Physiological basis ==
Broodiness is due to the secretion of the hormone prolactin by the anterior lobe of the hypophysis. Prolactin injection in hens provokes egg laying to stop within a few days, vitellum reabsorption, ovary regression (hens only have a left ovary) and finally broodiness. However, attempts to stop broodiness by the administration of several hormones have failed because this state, once evoked, requires time to revert.

Prolactin injections inhibit the production of gonadotropin hormone, a hormone that stimulates ovarian follicles which is produced in the frontal lobe of hypophysis.

Castrated males can go broody with baby chicks, showing that broodiness is not limited to females, however, castrated males do not incubate eggs.

Contrary to common opinion, the temperature of broody hens barely differs from that of laying hens. Broody hens pluck feathers from their chest, using them to cover the eggs. As a consequence of this, they develop one or several patches of bare skin on the ventral surface. These reddish, well-vascularized areas of skin are usually called brood patches which improve heat transfer to the eggs.

== Genetic basis ==
Broodiness is more common in some chicken breeds than others, indicating that it is a heritable characteristic. Breeds such as Cochin, Cornish and Silkie exhibit a tendency to broodiness, including brooding eggs from other species such as quails, pheasants, turkeys and geese. In some breeds such as the White Leghorn, broodiness is extremely rare.

Some studies on crosses of chicken breeds point to the hypothesis of complementary genes acting on broodiness. Other results point to the hypothesis of sex-linked genes, or, inheritance through the maternal chromosome. Although these studies have been made on different breeds of chickens, their results are not contradictory. There is common agreement that artificial selection for egg production succeeded in reducing the incidence of broody hens in chicken populations.

=== Chicken breeds that commonly exhibit broodiness ===
- Cochin
- Manx Rumpy
- Plymouth Rock
- Silkie
- Sussex
- Saipan Jungle Fowl
- Orpington
- Kraienköppe
- Belgian Bearded d'Anvers
- Icelandic Chicken
- Java (chicken)
- Philippine Native Chicken
- Belgian Bearded d'Uccle
- Iowa Blue
- Nankin
- Delaware
- Booted Bantam
- New Hampshire
- Pekin Bantam
- Dutch Bantam
- Indian Game (Cornish)

=== Chicken breeds that rarely exhibit broodiness ===
- Leghorn
- Polish
- Norwegian Jærhøne
- Brabanter
- Orloff
- Sultan
- Scots Grey
- Sebright
- Menorca
- Wyandotte
- Egyptian Fayoumi

== Broodiness in non-avian animals ==
There is some evidence that non-avian dinosaurs also practiced brooding. A specimen of the extinct Mongolian oviraptorid Citipati osmolskae was discovered in a chicken-like brooding position in 1993, which may indicate that they had begun using an insulating layer of feathers to keep the eggs warm.

Several deinonychosaur and oviraptorosaur specimens have also been found preserved on top of their nests, likely brooding in a bird-like manner.

Lungless salamanders in the family Plethodontidae lay a small number of eggs in a cluster among damp leaf litter. The female salamander often broods the eggs and in the genus Ensatinas, she has been observed to coil around them and press her throat area against them, effectively massaging them with a mucous secretion. The black mountain salamander mother broods her eggs, guarding them from predation as the larvae feed on the yolks of their eggs. They eventually break their way out of the egg capsules and disperse. Some species of Gymnophiona (caecilians, with long, cylindrical, limbless bodies) brood their eggs.

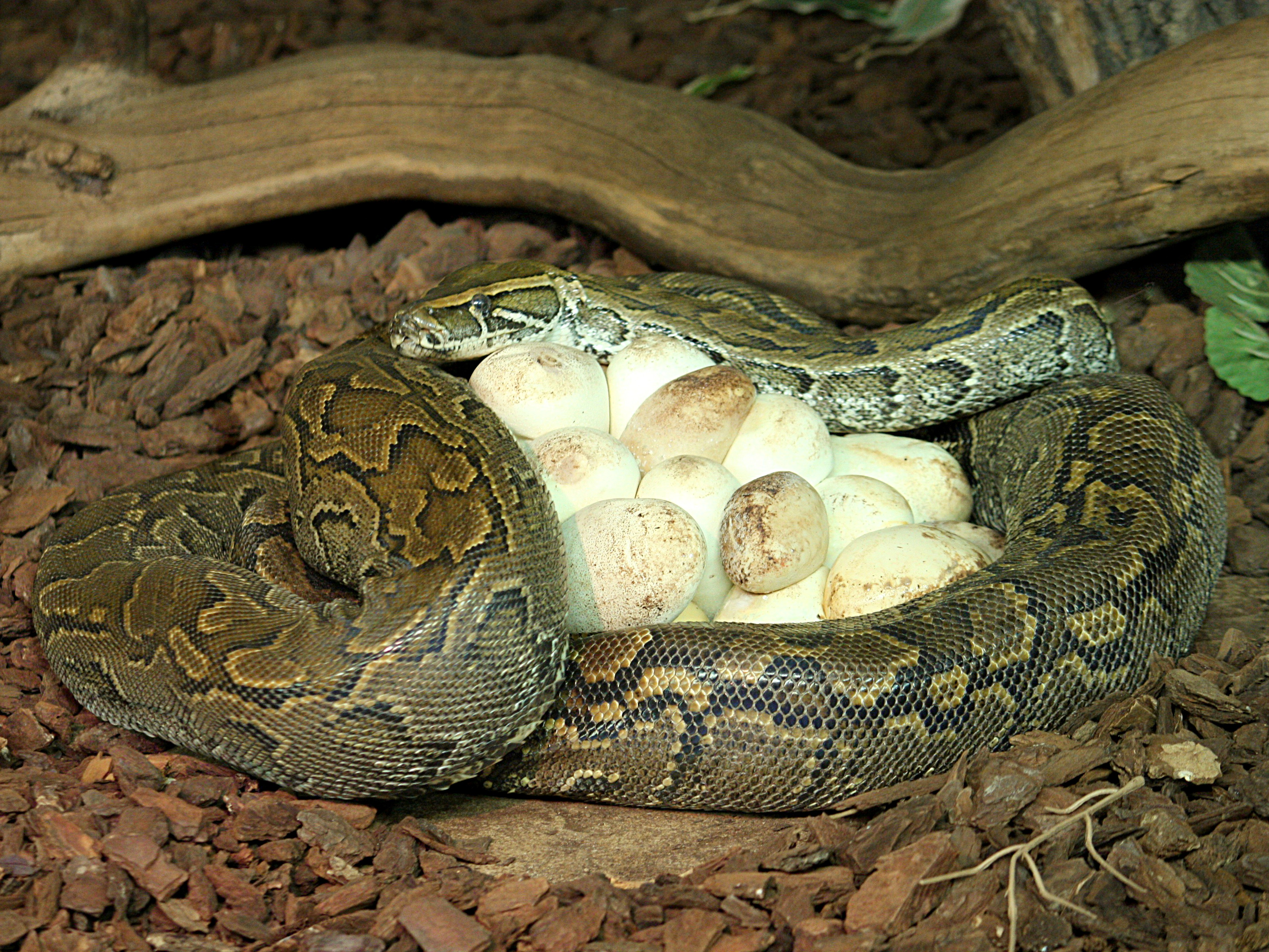
A brooding female python.

Most pythons coil around their egg-clutches and remain with them until they hatch. A female python will not leave the eggs, except to occasionally bask in the sun or drink water. She will even "shiver" to generate heat to incubate the eggs.

Some cichlid fish lay their eggs in the open, on rocks, leaves, or logs. Male and female parents usually engage in differing brooding roles. Most commonly, the male patrols the pair's territory and repels intruders, while females fan water over the eggs, removing the infertile and leading the fry while foraging. However, both sexes are able to perform the full range of parenting behaviours.

=== Mouthbrooding ===
Mouthbrooding, also known as oral incubation, refers to the care given by some groups of animals to fertilized eggs or their offspring by holding them in the mouth of the parent for extended periods of time. Although it has been observed in a variety of animals, most mouthbrooders are fish. The parent performing this behavior invariably feeds less often and afterwards will be underweight, requiring a period of feeding and restoring the depleted energy reserves.

=== Others ===
Marsupial frogs are so-called broody because they possess a dorsal brood pouch. In some species the eggs are fertilized on the female's lower back, and are inserted in her pouch with the aid of the male's toes. The eggs remain in contact with the female's vascular tissue, which provides them oxygen.

Some animals have a common name that includes the word 'brood' or its derivatives, although it is arguable whether the animals show 'broodiness' per se. For example, the female gastric-brooding frog (Rheobatrachus sp.) from Australia, now probably extinct, swallows her fertilized eggs, which then develop inside her stomach. She ceases to feed and stops secreting stomach acid and the tadpoles rely on the yolks of the eggs for nourishment. After six or seven weeks the mother opens her mouth wide and regurgitates the tadpoles which hop away from her mouth. The brooding sea anemone (Epiactis prolifera) is a colonial hermaphrodite that fertilizes and incubates its eggs internally. The motile larvae, after swimming out of the mouth, migrate down to the disk and become fixed there until they become little anemones, ready to move and feed independently.

In Darwin's frog (Rhinoderma darwinii), the female lays about 30 eggs and then the male guards them for about two weeks, until they hatch. The male then takes all the survivors and carries around the developing young in his vocal pouch. When the tiny tadpoles have developed they hop out and swim away. In this animal, the parents hold the hatched young rather than eggs in their mouths, so is arguably not showing 'broodiness'.

== See also ==
- Bee brood
- Brood parasite
- Brood patch
- Nesting instinct
- Allomothering
