= Frizzle (chicken breed) =

Breed of chicken

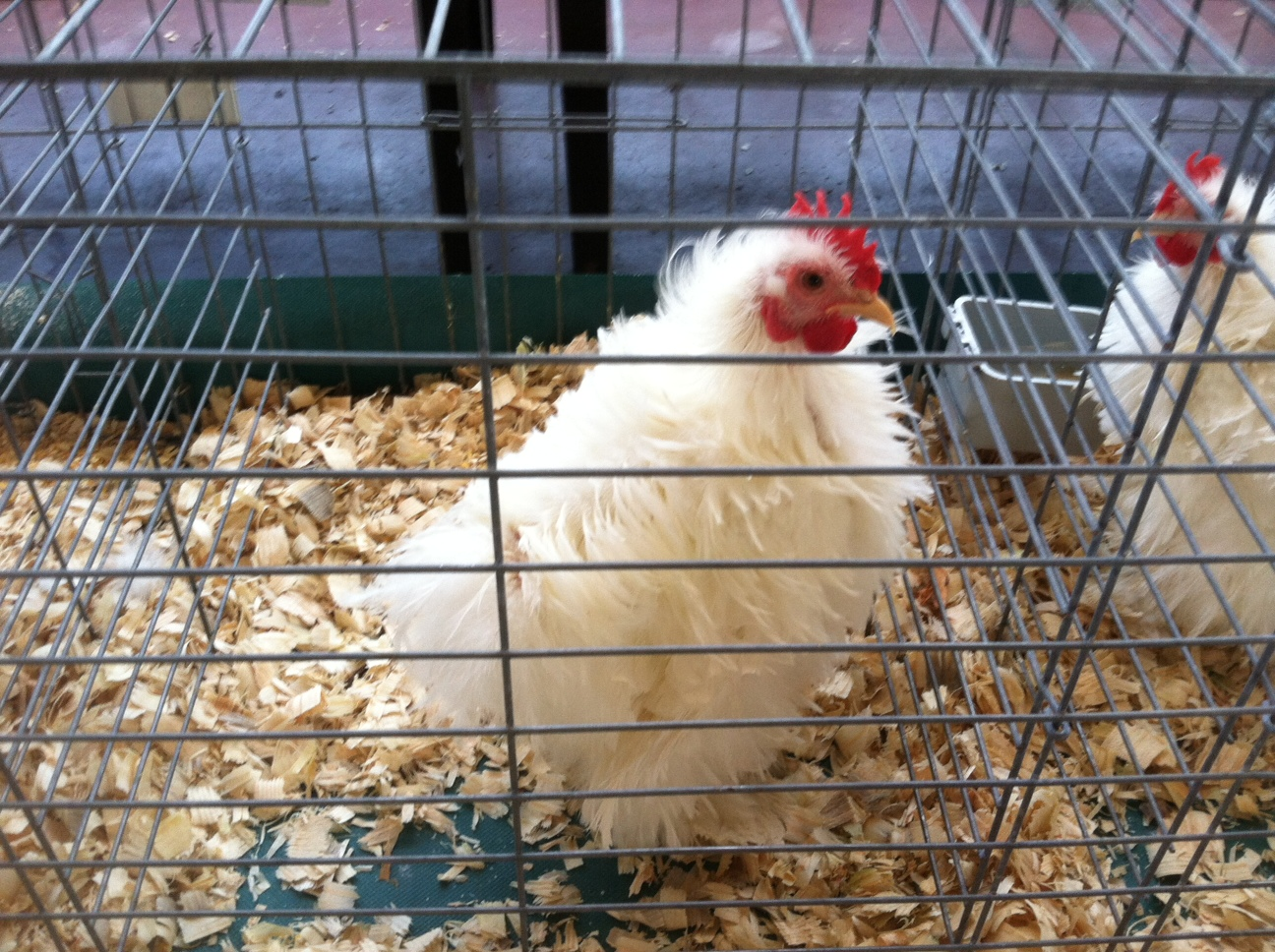
- A frizzle-feathered chicken at the Minnesota State Fair in Falcon Heights, Minnesota, USA; possibly not of the frizzle breed
- Use: fancy

Traits
- Weight: Male: Standard: 3.2–3.6 kg; Bantam: 680–790 g; Bantam, Australia: 960–1075 g; Female: Standard: 2.25–2.7 kg; Bantam: 570–680 g; Bantam, Australia: 790–910 g
- Egg colour: white or tinted
- Comb type: single

Classification
- APA: no
- EE: standard and bantam recognised
- PCGB: soft feather: heavy
- APS: heavy breed softfeather

Notes
- clean-legged
- Chicken; Gallus gallus domesticus

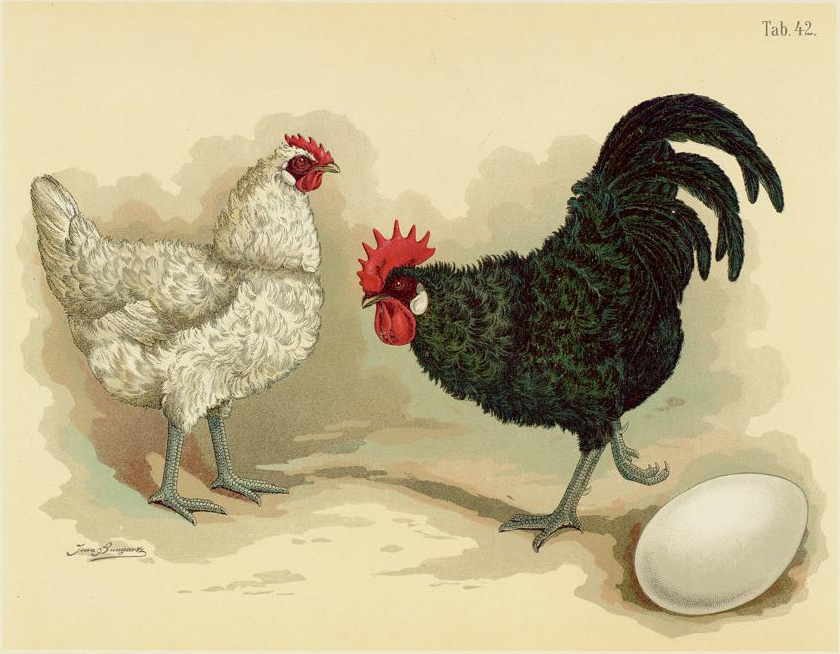
Illustration from the Geflügel-Album of Jean Bungartz, 1885

The Frizzle is a breed of chicken with characteristic curled or frizzled plumage. While the frizzle gene can be seen in many breeds, such as the Pekin and Polish, the Frizzle is recognised as a distinct breed in a number of European countries and Australia. In the United States, frizzled chickens are not considered a breed, and at shows are judged by the standards of the breed they belong to.

== History ==
The origin of the Frizzle is unknown. The frizzle gene is thought to have originated in Asia; frizzled chickens have been reported from the Far East since the eighteenth century. The Frizzle breed is the result of selective breeding for exhibition. It is recognised in nine European countries: Belgium, the Czech Republic, France, Germany, Ireland, Italy, Poland, Slovakia and the United Kingdom.

== Characteristics ==
The gene for the curling of the feathers is incompletely dominant over normal plumage; not all members of the breed have frizzled feathers. Frizzled birds are heterozygous for the gene; when two are bred, the offspring inherit the gene in the usual Mendelian 1:2:1 ratio: 50% are heterozygous and frizzled like the parents, 25% have normal feathering, and 25% are "over-frizzled", with brittle feathers resembling pipe-cleaners. The Frizzle has a single comb and is clean-legged – without feathers on the shanks. It is a good forager and is hardy.

Four colours are recognised in the Entente Européenne standard: black, blue, cuckoo and white. The Poultry Club of Great Britain recognises nineteen colours for both standard and bantam sizes; not all of them are currently bred. The Australian Poultry Standards recognise black, blue, buff, white, Columbian, red and "any recognised colour".

Research suggests that the frizzled phenotype comes from a mutation within the keratin gene KRT75. A deletion that removed part of exon 5 and intron 5 ameliorated the splice site. This caused a 69 base pair deletion of the KRT75 gene.

== Use ==
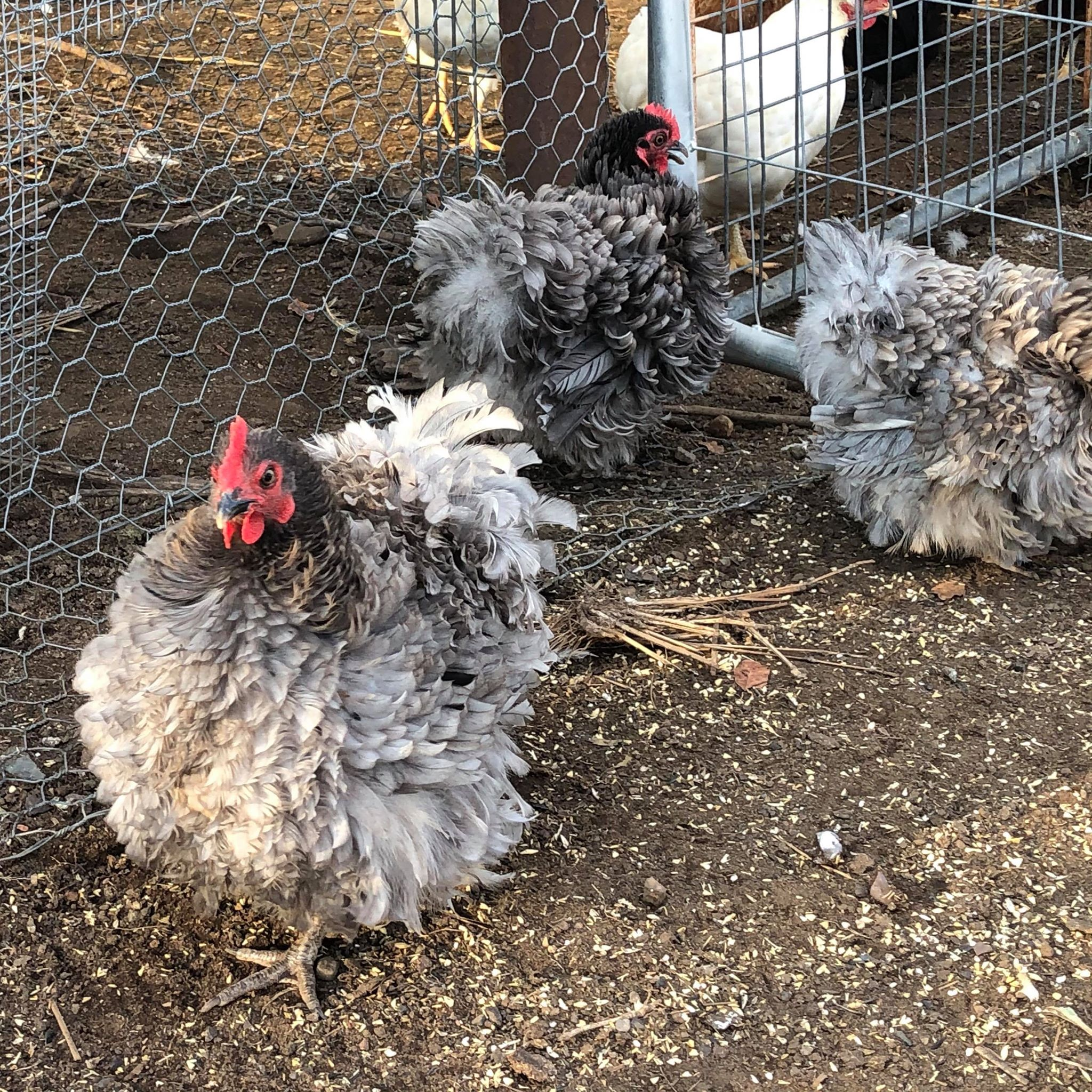
Blue Frizzle Pullets bred in Jandowae, in Queensland, Australia

The Frizzle is reared exclusively for exhibition. It is a good layer of white or tinted eggs, and frequently gets broody.
