= Frizzle chicken =

Frizzle chicken may refer to:

- Frizzle (chicken plumage), a curled-feather type of chicken plumage common to certain breeds of domestic chicken
- Frizzle (chicken breed), a specific breed of domestic chicken with this feature
