= Iowa Blue =

Breed of chicken

- Conservation status: not recognized
- Country of origin: United States

Traits
- Weight: Male: 7 lb (3.2 kg); Female: 6 lb (2.7 kg)
- Comb type: single

Classification
- Chicken; Gallus gallus domesticus

The Iowa Blue is a breed of chicken that originated near Decorah, Iowa, in the early 20th century. Despite its name, the breed is not actually blue, but is gray, white, and black. It is an exceedingly rare fowl, and is not recognized for showing by the American Poultry Association. They are a dual-purpose breed laying brown eggs and known to be good foragers.

== History ==
The Iowa Blue's exact origin is unknown, but is the subject of a folk legend that is said to have involved White Leghorns, Black Minorcas, Rhode Island Reds, and a pheasant (which is a genetic impossibility, as pheasants and chickens cannot interbreed). This is especially unlikely considering that Leghorns are light-weight birds with white earlobes, yellow skin, and which lay white eggs.

Iowa Blues have never been recognized officially by the American Poultry Association, American Bantam Association, or any other breed standard. Into the 1960s, several hatcheries around Iowa sold the breed, but after these hatcheries either closed or stopped selling them, the Iowa Blue nearly disappeared. Dedicated breed enthusiasts have preserved the breed into the 21st century, though their numbers remain small. It is listed as "Study" by the American Livestock Breeds Conservancy, entailing that is of conservation interest but lacks the documentation to be firmly categorized.

== Characteristics ==
Iowa Blues are a dual-purpose chicken. With males weighing 7 pounds (3.2 kg) and hens 6 lb (2.7 kg), they can produce a fair amount of meat. Hens lay a good amount of brown eggs, and will go broody. They are also known to be good foragers, and will do well in free range conditions. They can be a little skittish. Male Iowa Blues are among the best guardians of a flock, being particularly competent hawk fighters. The breed has red earlobes, and a single comb. They appear in a single color variety, which is not actually the blue color defined by poultry breed standards. It has a silvery white head, and the body plumage is dark brown or black with white lacing. The back is also white in roosters, and the overall color is technically referred to as "penciling". When mated with other breeds, especially White Plymouth Rocks or New Hampshires, Iowa Blues will produce sex linked hybrid offspring.
