= Egg incubation =

Process by which certain egg-laying animals hatch their eggs

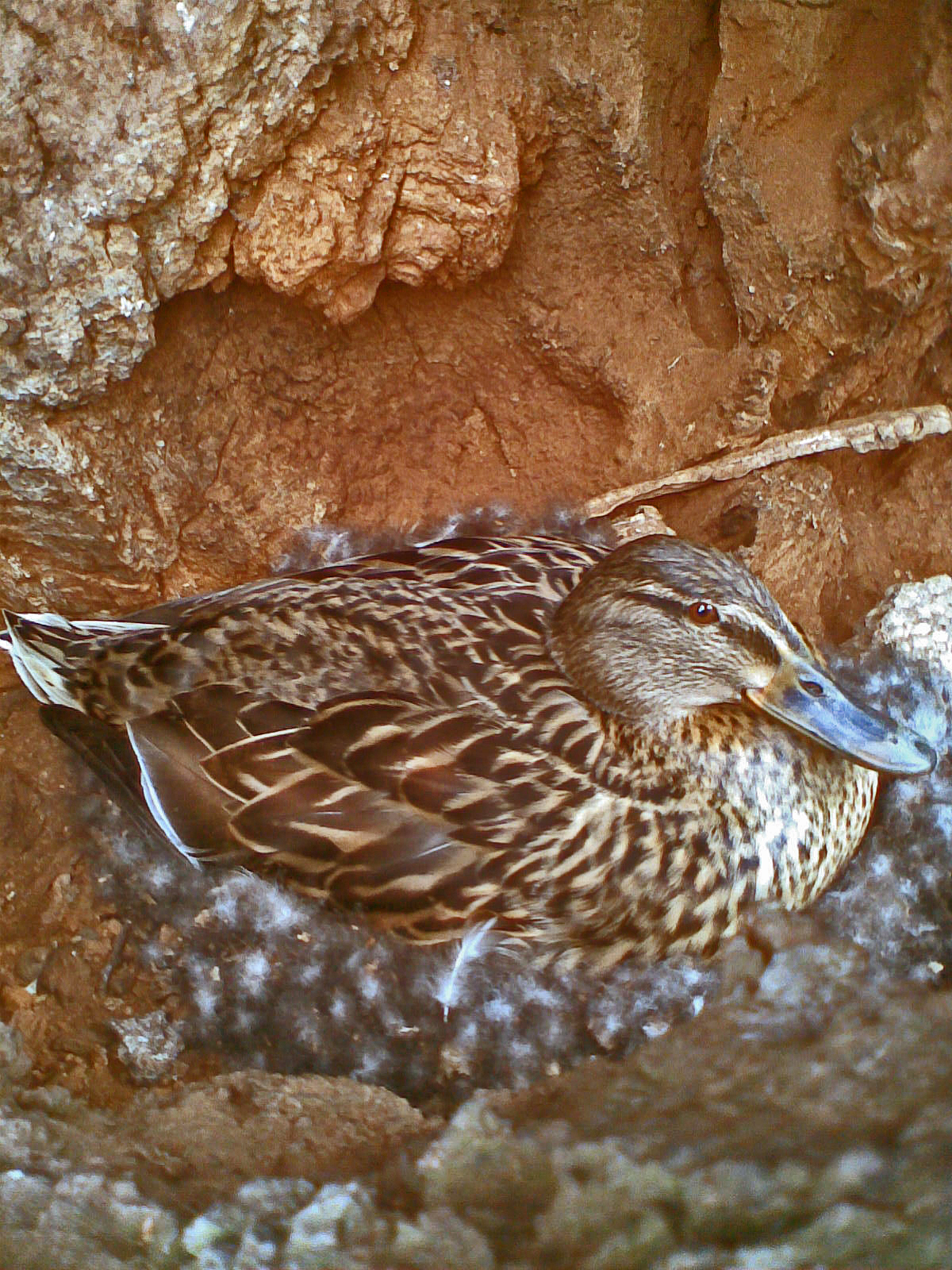
A female mallard duck incubates her eggs

Egg incubation is the process by which an egg, of oviparous (egg-laying) animals, develops an embryo within the egg, after the egg's formation and ovipositional release. Egg incubation is done under favorable environmental conditions, possibly by brooding and hatching the egg.

Multiple and various factors are vital to the incubation of various species of animals. In many species of reptile for example, no fixed temperature is necessary, but the actual temperature determines the sex ratio of the offspring. In birds, the sex of offspring is genetically determined, but in many species a constant and particular temperature is necessary for successful incubation. Especially in poultry, the act of sitting on eggs to incubate them is called brooding. The action or behavioral tendency to sit on a clutch of eggs is also called broodiness, and most egg-laying breeds of poultry have had this behavior selectively bred out of them to increase production.

== Avian incubation ==
A wide range of incubation habits is displayed among birds. In warm-blooded species such as bird species generally, body heat from the brooding patch of the brooding parent provides the constant temperature. Several groups, notably the megapodes, instead use heat generated from rotting vegetable material, effectively creating a giant compost heap, while crab plovers make partial use of heat from the sun. The Namaqua sandgrouse of the deserts of southern Africa, needing to keep its eggs cool during the heat of the day, stands over them drooping its wings to shade them. The humidity is also critical, because if the air is too dry the egg will lose too much water to the atmosphere, which can make hatching difficult or impossible. As incubation proceeds, an egg will normally become lighter, and the air space within the egg will normally become larger, owing to evaporation from the egg. During incubation, the inner layers of the shell are dissolved by their acidic environment and the calcium carbonate that had been part of the shell is incorporated into the skeleton of the foetus.

Experiments with great tits show that females compensate for the potential effects of differential heating by moving the eggs homogeneously within the clutch.

In the species that incubate, the work is divided differently between the sexes. Possibly the most common pattern is that the female does all the incubation, as in the Atlantic canary and the Indian robin, or most of it, as is typical of falcons. In some species, such as the whooping crane, the male and the female take turns incubating the egg. In others, such as the cassowaries, only the male incubates. The male mountain plover incubates the female's first clutch, but if she lays a second, she incubates it herself. In hoatzins, some birds (mostly males) help their parents incubate later broods.

The incubation period, the time from the start of uninterrupted incubation to the emergence of the young, varies from 11 days (some small passerines and the black-billed and yellow-billed cuckoos) to 85 days (the wandering albatross and the brown kiwi). In these latter, the incubation is interrupted; the longest uninterrupted period is 64 to 67 days in the emperor penguin. In general smaller birds tend to hatch faster, but there are exceptions, and cavity nesting birds tend to have longer incubation periods. It can be an energetically demanding process, with adult albatrosses losing as much as 83 g of body weight a day. Megapode eggs take from 49 to 90 days depending on the mound and ambient temperature. Even in other birds, ambient temperatures can lead to variation in the incubation period. Normally the egg is incubated outside the body. However, in one recorded case, the egg incubation occurred entirely within a chicken. The chick hatched inside and emerged from its mother without the shell, leading to internal wounds that killed the mother hen.

Embryo development remains suspended until the onset of incubation. The freshly laid eggs of domestic fowl, ostrich, and several other species can be stored for about two weeks when maintained under 5 °C. Extended periods of suspension have been observed in some marine birds. Some species begin incubation with the first egg, causing the young to hatch at different times; others begin after laying the second egg, so that the third chick will be smaller and more vulnerable to food shortages. Some start to incubate after the last egg of the clutch, causing the young to hatch simultaneously.

Incubation periods for birds:

| Bird | Incubation period (days) |
|---|---|
| Chicken | 21 |
| Duck | 28, Muscovy duck 35 |
| Canary | 13 |
| Goose | 28–33 |
| Ostrich | 42 |
| Pheasant | 24–26 |
| Pigeons | 16–19 |
| Coturnix Quail | 16–18 |
| Bobwhite Quail | 23–24 |
| Swan | 35 |
| Turkey | 28 |
| Scarlet macaw | 26 |

== Mammalian incubation ==
The only living mammals that lay eggs are echidnas and platypuses. In the latter, the eggs develop in utero for about 28 days, with only about 10 days of external incubation (in contrast to a chicken egg, which spends about one day in the tract and 21 days externally). After laying her eggs, the female curls around them. The incubation period is divided into three phases. In the first phase, the embryo has no functional organs and relies on the yolk sac for sustenance. The yolk is absorbed by the developing young. During the second phase, the digits develop. In the last phase, the egg tooth appears.

== Reptilian incubation ==
Methods of incubation vary widely among the many different kinds of reptiles.

Various species of sea turtles bury their eggs on beaches under a layer of sand that provides both protection from predators and a constant temperature for the nest.

Snakes may lay eggs in communal burrows, where a large number of adults combine to keep the eggs warm. Some species coil their torsos around the eggs to provide heat for incubation.

Alligators and crocodiles either lay their eggs in mounds of decomposing vegetation or lay them in holes they dig in the ground.

== Incubation by other vertebrates ==
Fish generally do not incubate their eggs. However, some species mouthbrood their eggs, not eating until they hatch.

Some amphibians brood their eggs. The female salamander Ensatina (Ensatina eschscholtzii) curls around the clutch of eggs and massages individual eggs with her pulsating throat. Some aquatic frogs such as the Surinam toad (Pipa pipa) have pouches in their skin into which the eggs are inserted. Other neotropical frogs in the family Hemiphractidae also have pouches in which the eggs develop, in some species directly into juvenile frogs and in others into tadpoles that are later deposited in small water bodies to continue their development. The male Darwin's frog carries the eggs around in his mouth until metamorphosis, and the female stomach-brooding frog of Australia swallows the eggs, which develop in her stomach.

== Incubation by invertebrates ==
Brooding occurs in some invertebrates when the fertilised eggs are retained inside or on the surface of the parent, usually the mother. This happens in some cnidarians (sea anemones and corals), a few chitons, some gastropod molluscs, some cephalopods, some bivalve molluscs, many arthropods, some entoproctans, some brachiopods, some bryozoans, and some starfish.

== See also ==
- Artificial incubation
- Broodiness
- Incubator (egg)
