= Frizzle (chicken plumage) =

Type of chicken with feathers that curl outwards

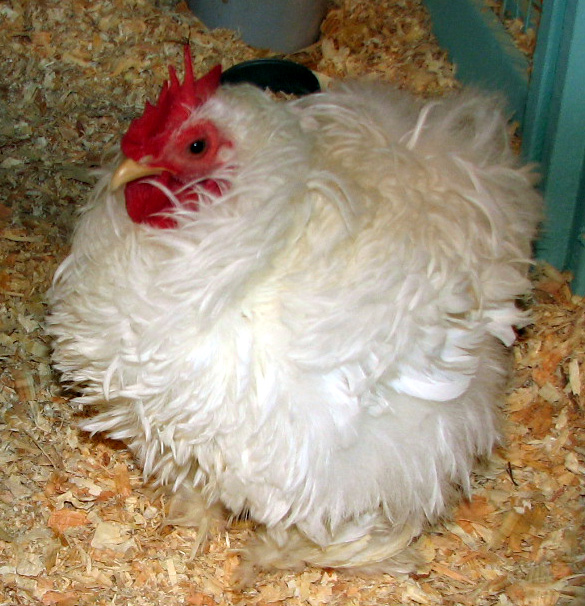
A Frizzle White Pekin

A frizzle refers to a plumage pattern in domesticated chickens (Gallus gallus domesticus) characterized by feathers that curl outwards, rather than lying flat as in most chickens. The frizzle type is not a separate breed, but a variety within breeds. Though all breeds of chickens may be frizzled; it is most commonly seen in breeds such as the Cochin, Pekin, and Polish. Chickens with this pattern are sometimes referred to as frizzles. The gene which causes the frizzles' peculiar feathering is an incomplete dominant trait.

== Common Breeds ==
Almost all breeds can be frizzled, but the most common are listed below:

- Cochin
- Polish
- Silkie (Commonly referred to as "Sizzle")
- Plymouth Rock
- Buff Orpington

Bantam Breeds:

- Japanese Bantams
- Pekin

== Genetics ==
Research suggests that the frizzled phenotype comes from a mutation within the keratin gene KRT75. A deletion that removed part of exon 5 and intron 5 ameliorated the splice site. This caused a 69 base pair deletion of the KRT75 gene.

== Uses ==
As a result of its unusual look, frizzles are primarily used as exhibition birds, and are included in most English language poultry standards.

There is a pure breed of chicken with this feature, known as the Frizzle breed.

== See also ==
- Frizzle (chicken breed), a specific breed with this feature
