= Kraienkopp =

Breed of chicken

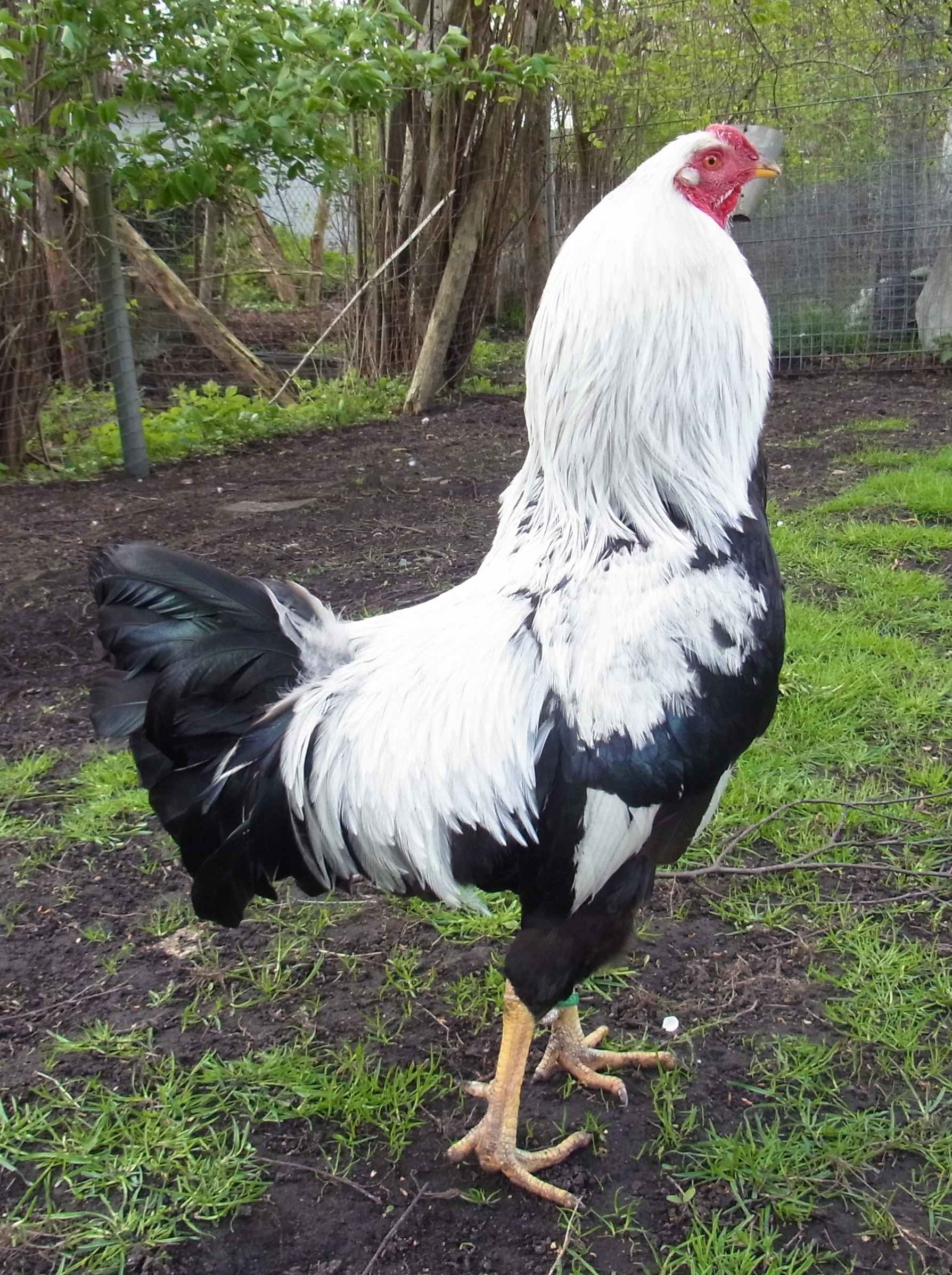
- A silver duckwing cock
- Other names: Twents Hoen; Twentse
- Country of origin: Germany; Netherlands

Classification
- PCGB: rare soft feather: light
- Chicken; Gallus gallus domesticus

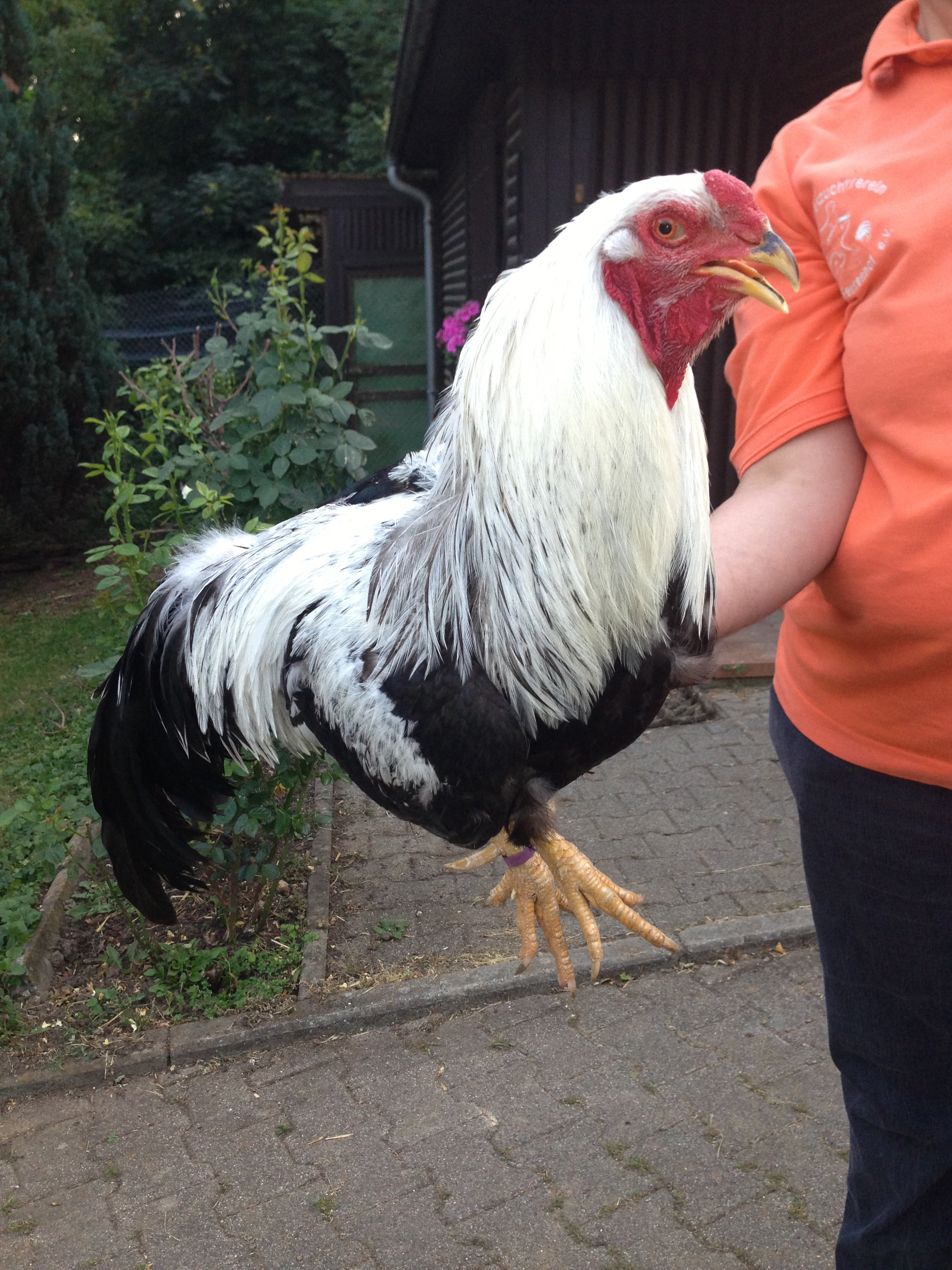
Another cock bird

The Kraienkopp (German pronunciation: [ˈkʁaɪənˌkɔp]) or Twents Hoen (Dutch pronunciation: [ˈtʋɛnts ˈɦun]) is a breed of chicken originating on the border region between Germany and the Netherlands. The latter of the two names is the Dutch language version, while the former is German.

== History ==
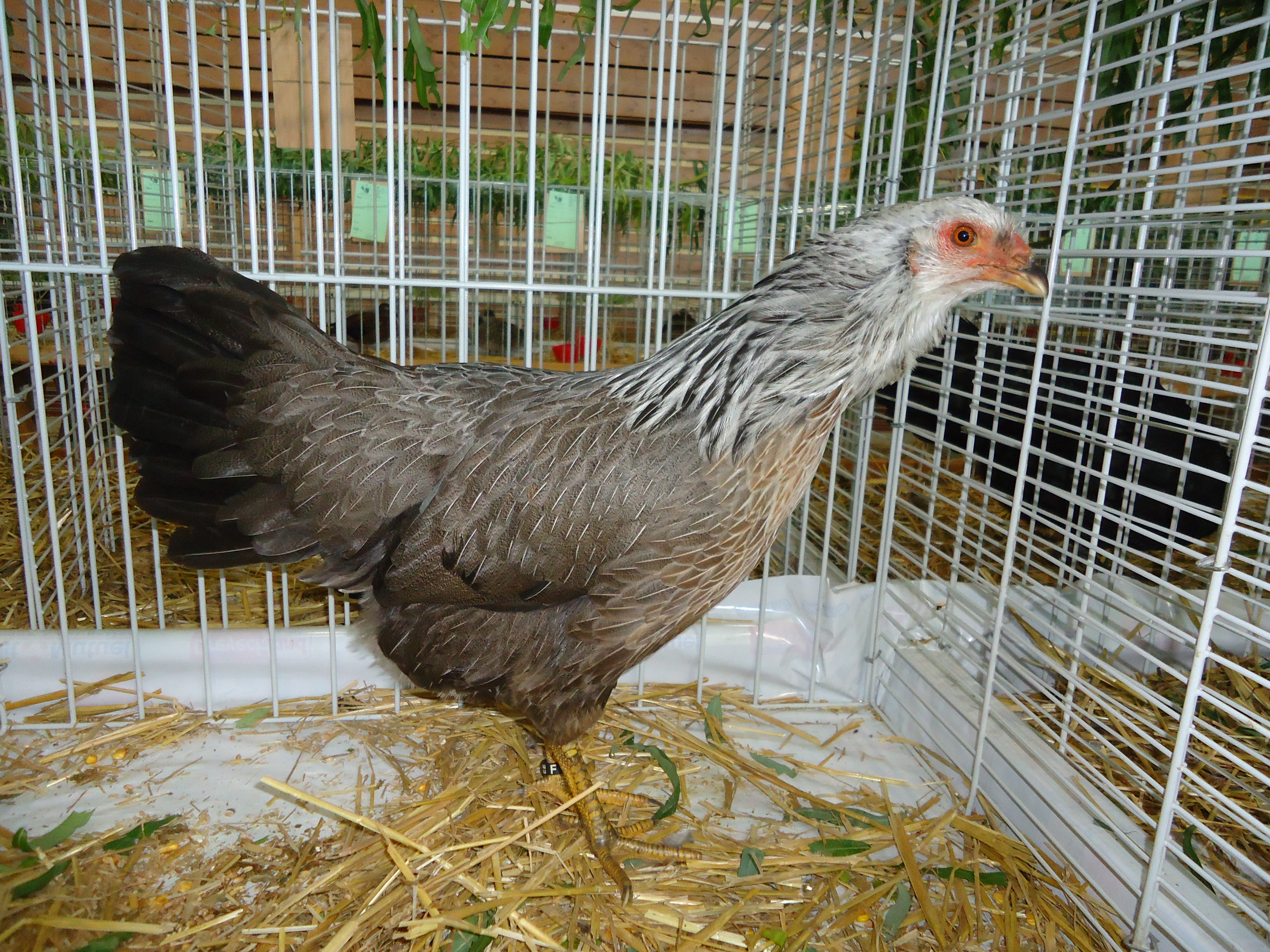
Silver hen bird

The Kraienkopp breed was developed in the late nineteenth century from crosses of local types with Malays, and later with silver duckwing Leghorns. It was first shown in the Netherlands in 1920, and was shown in Germany in 1925.

== Characteristics ==
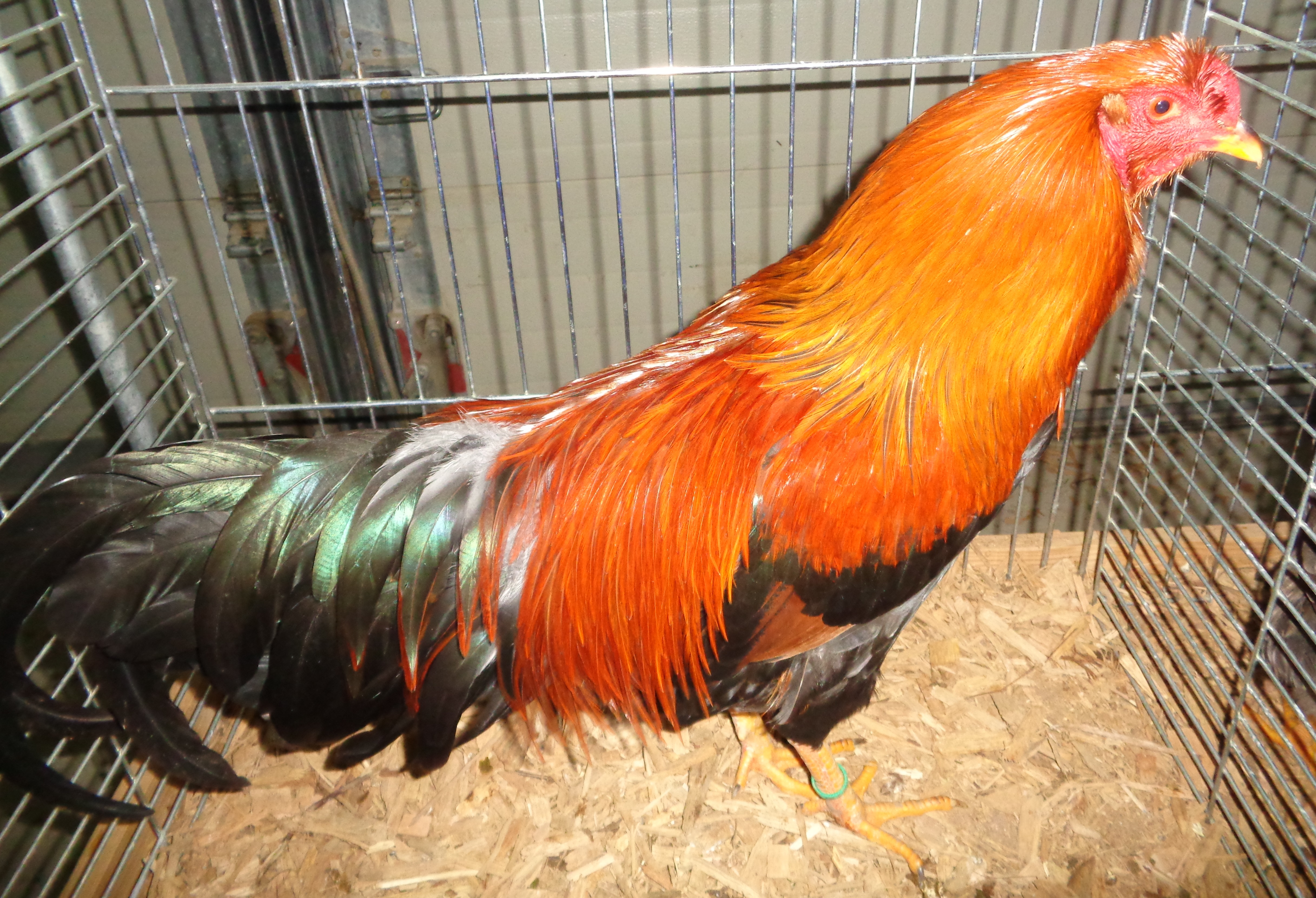
Black breasted red cock

The Kraienkopp appears in numerous colour varieties: in the United Kingdom silver, gold, orange/lemon, blue-gold, crele, pile, blue-silver, cuckoo and silver cuckoo are recognised. Males weigh 2.75 kilos (6 pounds), and females weigh 1.8 kilos (4 pounds). They have yellow skin and a small walnut-type comb.

== Use ==
It is a rare breed, and is usually kept as a layer or as a show bird. Hens lay a fair number of off-white eggs, and will go broody. It is an active bird with excellent foraging abilities.
