= Taiwanese Game =

Breed of chicken

- Conservation status: FAO (2007): not listed; DAD-IS (2022): unknown
- Other names: Taiwan; Taiwanese Shamo
- Country of origin: Taiwan

Traits
- Weight: Male: 5–7 kg; Female: 4–5.5 kg

Classification
- APA: no
- EE: no
- PCGB: Asian hard feather
- Chicken; Gallus gallus domesticus

The Taiwanese Game or Taiwan is a breed of large game chicken originating in the island of Taiwan. It is among the largest of chicken breeds, and may exceed 10 kg in body weight. It shows some similarity to large Japanese Shamo birds and, although it does not originate in Japan, may also be known as the Taiwanese Shamo. Large game chickens of this type but of indeterminate breed may sometimes be marketed as "Taiwan" or – in the United States – as "Saipan", "Saipan Jungle Fowl" or "Chinese Shamo".

== Characteristics ==
The Taiwanese Game is a very large game chicken similar in type to the Malay. It is among the heaviest of chicken breeds, and may exceed 10 kg in body weight; typical weights are in the range 5–7 kg for cocks, and 4–5.5 kg for hens.

It may be of any colour, but is most often wheaten. The feet and legs are yellow, sometimes marked with black, the beak is yellowish or horn-coloured, and the face, ear-lobes, comb and throat are all a vivid red.
