= Brood patch =

Area of bare skin on the underside of nesting birds

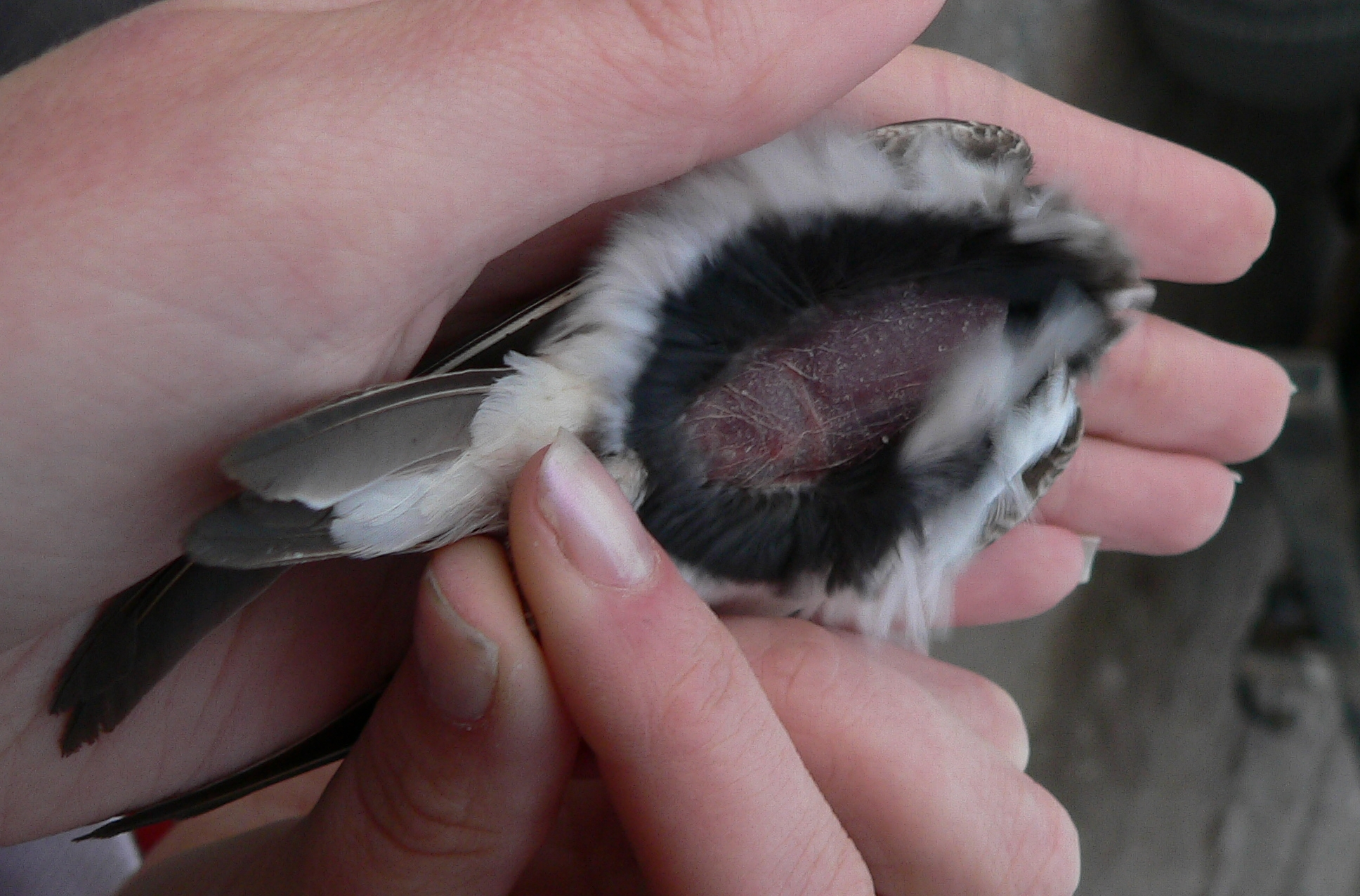
Brood patch of a sand martin

A brood patch, also known as an incubation patch in older literature, is an area of featherless skin on the underside of birds that exists during the nesting season. Feathers act as inherent insulators and prevent efficient incubation, to which brood patches are the solution. This patch of skin is well supplied with blood vessels at the surface, enabling heat transfer to the eggs when incubating.

== Location ==
The positions of brood patches can vary. Many have a single brood patch in the middle of the belly, while some shorebirds have one patch on each side of the belly. Great Auks and Razorbills develop two brood patches on the side of the body. Gulls and Galliformes may have three brood patches. American kestrels develop three brood patches.

Pelicans, boobies, and gannets do not develop brood patches but cradle the eggs on their feet. Brood parasitic cuckoos do not develop brood patches. In species where both parents incubate, brood patches may develop in both sexes, though the size of the patch may vary by sex and size of the bird.

== Formation ==
Shortly before egg laying, hormones such as oestrogen, prolactin, and progesterone cause a bird’s belly feathers to loosen and fall out, thus forming a patch of bare skin. In most species, the feathers in the region shed automatically, but ducks and geese may pluck and use their feathers to line the nest. Feathers regrow sooner after hatching in precocial birds than for those that have altricial young.

== Function ==
=== Incubation ===
Brood patches help carry heat close to the skin surface during incubation. Additionally, birds may accumulate fat around the patch to increase its pliability. Upon settling on a nest, birds will shift in a characteristic side to side manner to ensure full contact of the brood patch with eggs or young.

=== Clutch size ===
Brood patch can help regulate number of eggs produced in one cycle, or clutch size. Once eggs are laid, the touch sensors in the brood patch detect the eggs and trigger hormonal responses to limit ova production. However, if the eggs are removed or broken shortly after the eggs are laid, this hormonal regulation will not happen, and eggs can be continuously produced.

== See also ==
- Broodiness
