= New Hampshire Red =

American breed of chicken

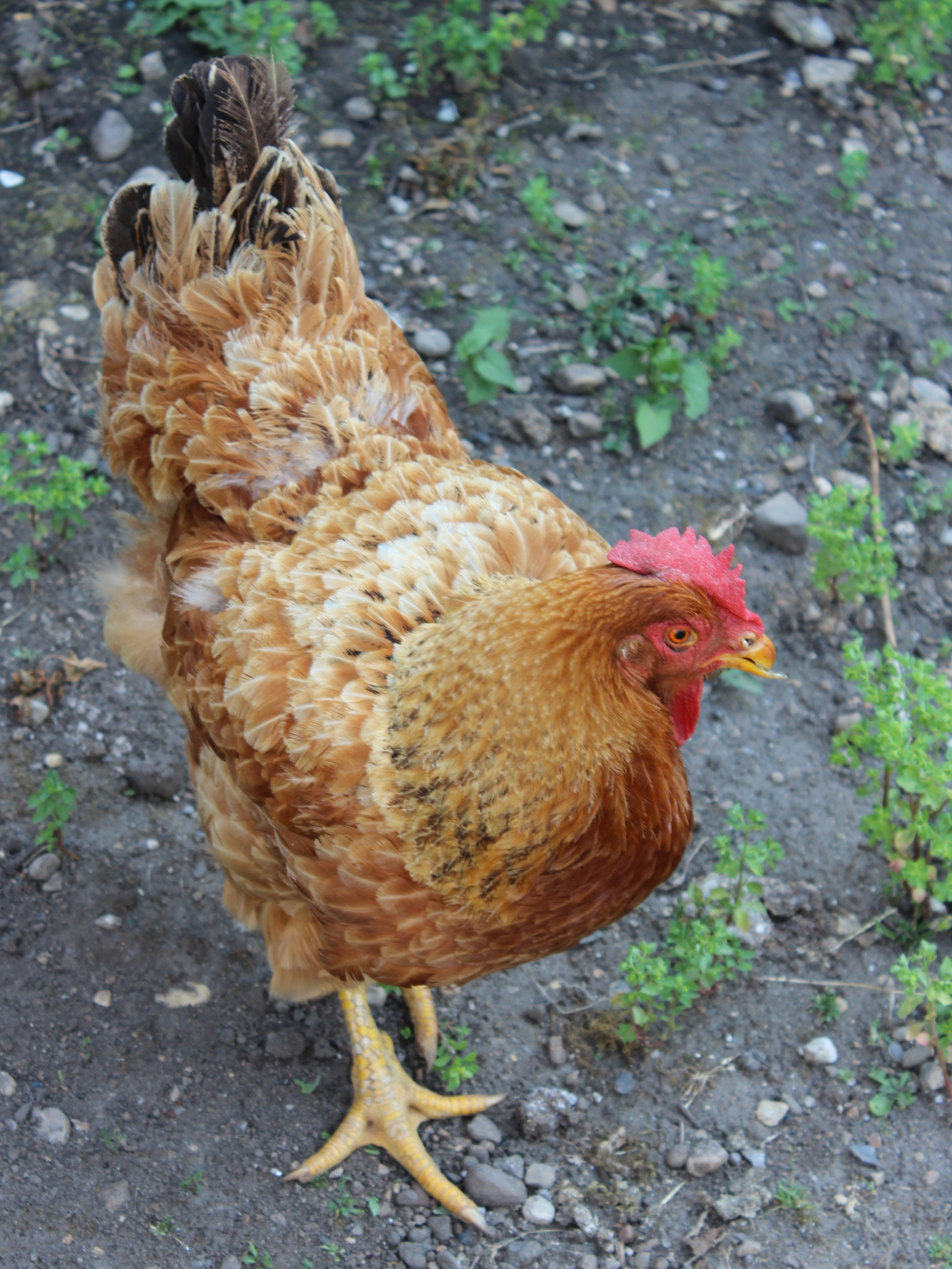
- Conservation status: FAO (2007): not at risk; DAD-IS (2022): not at risk; Livestock Conservancy (2022): watch
- Other names: New Hampshire
- Country of origin: United States of America
- Use: dual-purpose, meat and eggs

Traits
- Weight: Male: Large fowl: 3.9 kg (8.5 lb); Bantam: 1000 g (35 oz); Female: Large fowl: 3.0 kg (6.5 lb); Bantam: 750 g (26 oz)
- Skin color: yellow
- Egg color: brown
- Comb type: single

Classification
- APA: American
- ABA: single comb, clean legged
- EE: yes
- PCGB: soft feather: heavy
- Chicken; Gallus gallus domesticus

The New Hampshire Red or New Hampshire is an American breed of chicken. It was developed in the early twentieth century in the state of New Hampshire by selective breeding of Rhode Island Red stock; no other breed was involved. It is fast-growing, early-maturing, quick-feathering, and yields a meaty carcass. Mature birds are a light or medium red in color; they may fade in sunlight.

== History ==
The New Hampshire Red was developed over a period of about thirty years in the early twentieth century in the state of New Hampshire, partly by farmers in the state and partly through research conducted at the New Hampshire Agricultural Experiment Station at Durham. Birds of the Rhode Island Red breed were selectively bred for rapid growth and rapid feathering, with an emphasis on meat production; no other breed was involved. Color was not a criterion for selection, and the resulting birds were of a somewhat lighter red than the original Rhode Island stock. The New Hampshire Red was admitted to the American Standard of Perfection in 1935; the bantam was added in 1960.

In the 1940s New Hampshire hens contributed to the development of the Delaware breed of that state.

In 2018 the New Hampshire Red was designated the official poultry of the state following a proposal from students at Canaan Elementary School.

The conservation status of the breed is reported to DAD-IS as "not at risk"; the most recent population data is from 2015, when it was reported to be approximately 3300 birds. The Livestock Conservancy lists it as "watch".

== Characteristics ==
The New Hampshire Red is of medium-large size, males weighing about 3.9 kg (8.5 lb) and hens approximately 3.0 kg (6.5 lb). Bantams weigh roughly a quarter of the weights of large fowl. In the United States and the United Kingdom only the red color variant is recognized; the Entente Européenne recognizes two further colors, white and blue-tailed red. The white was bred in Germany in 1954, and was separately created in the United States at about the same time.

In the red variant, the plumage varies from a golden bay to a chestnut color; the tail feathers of the cock bird are black, and the hen has some black in the tail, in the neck feathers and in the wing primaries. The comb is single and five-pointed, the earlobes are a long oval in shape, the wattles are fairly large; all these are red, as is the face. The beak is a reddish brown or horn color, the eyes bay. The legs and feet are yellow with reddish-brown overtones.

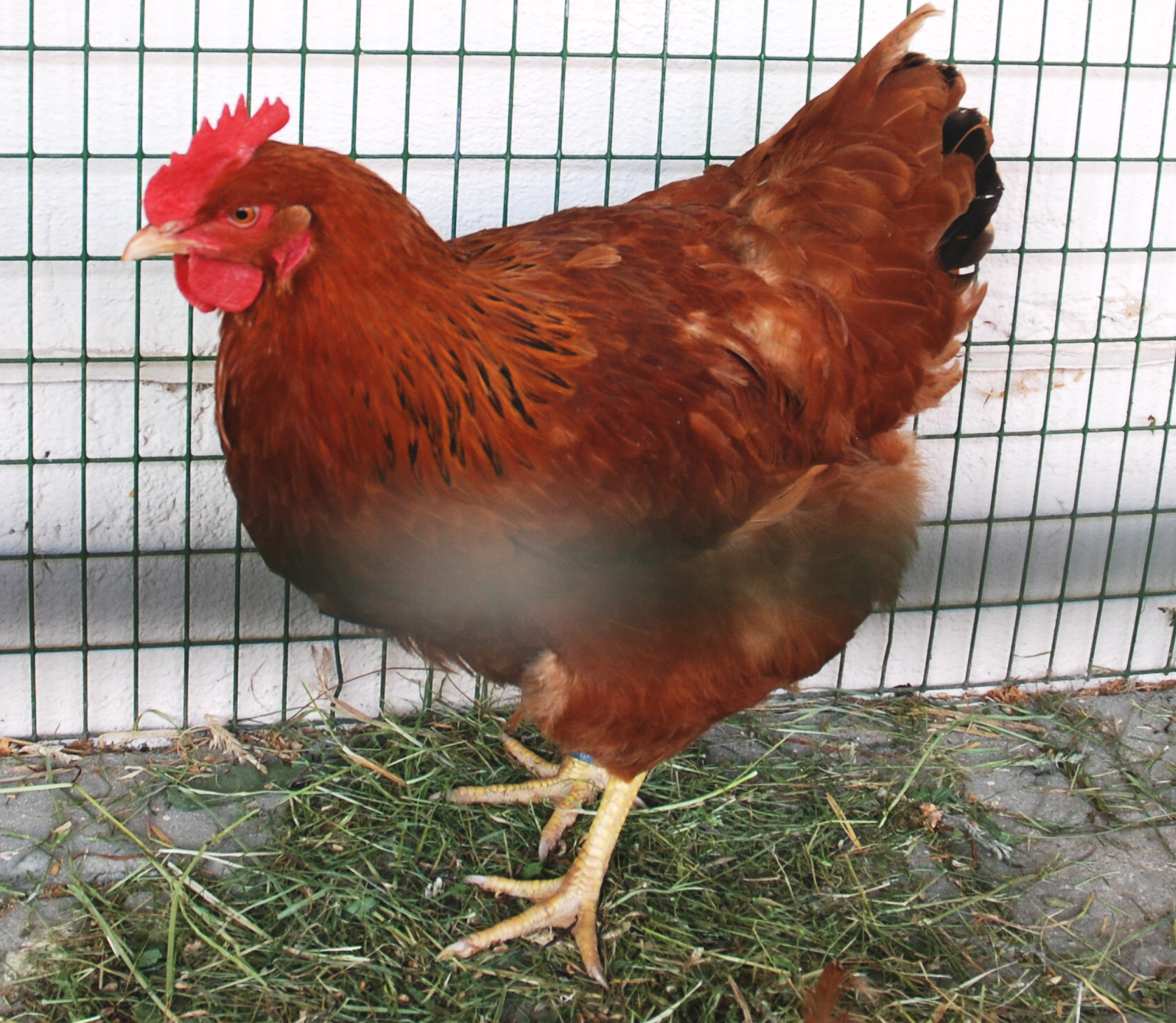
Show bird, hen

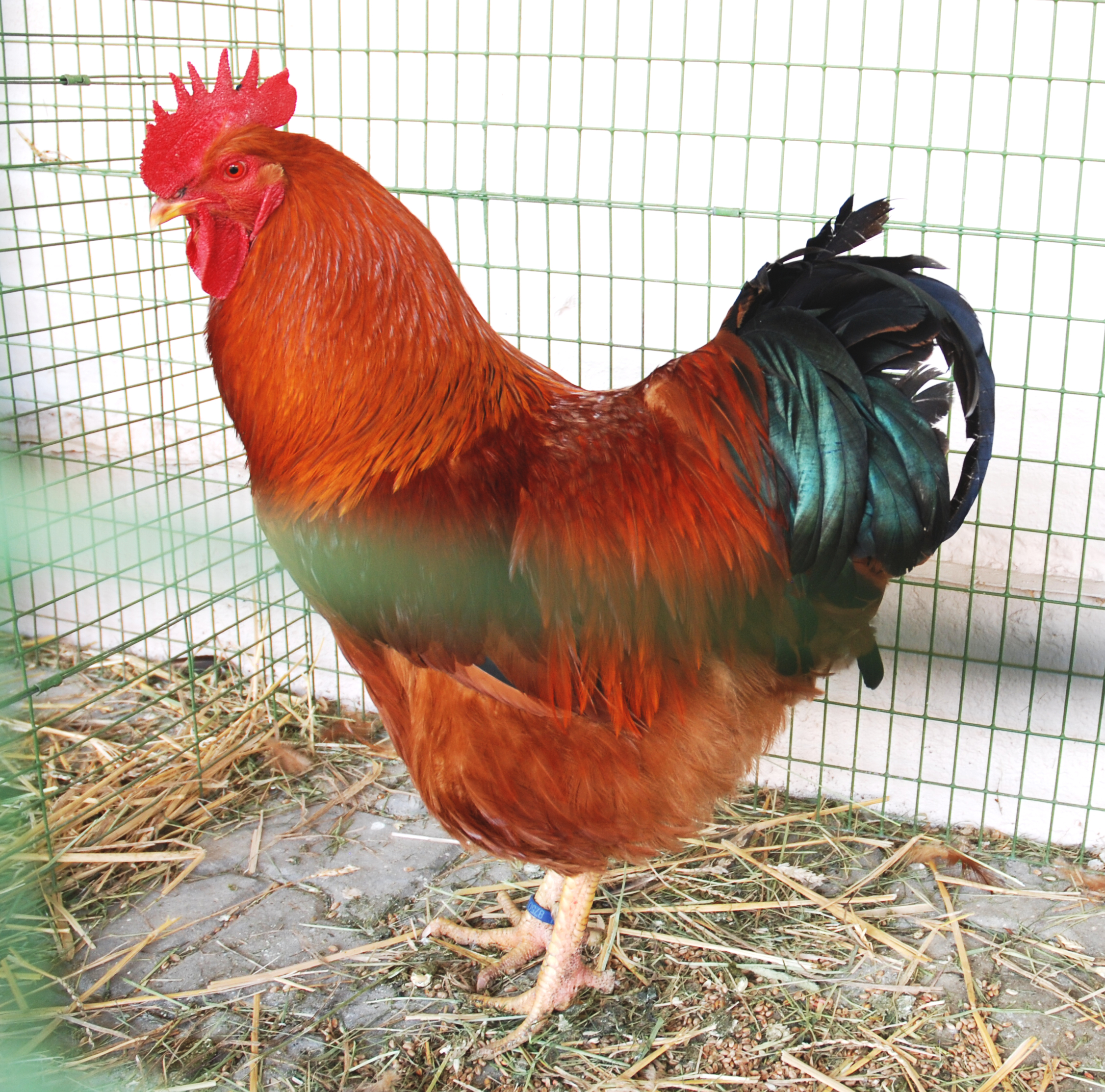
Show bird, cock

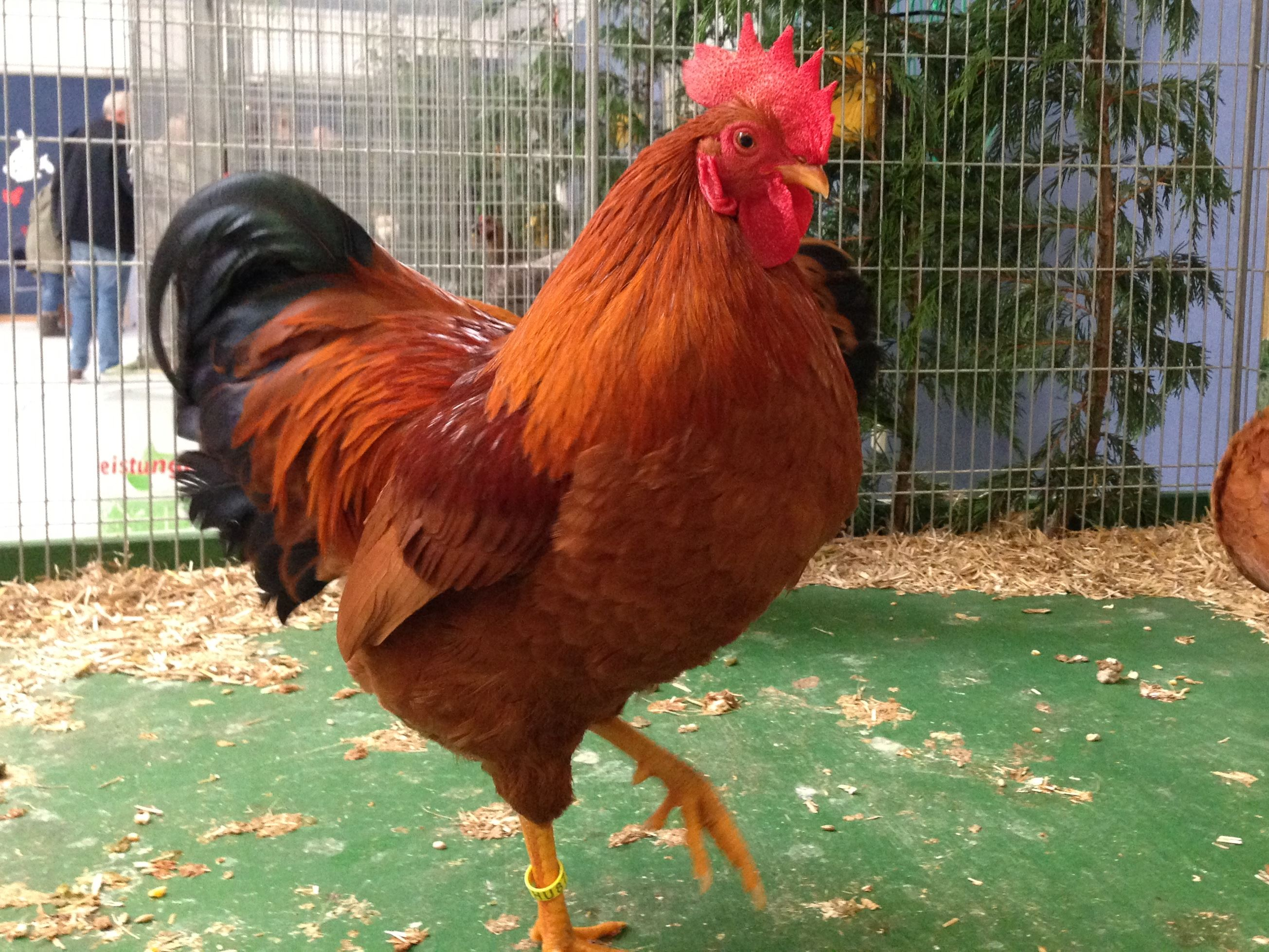
Bantam cock

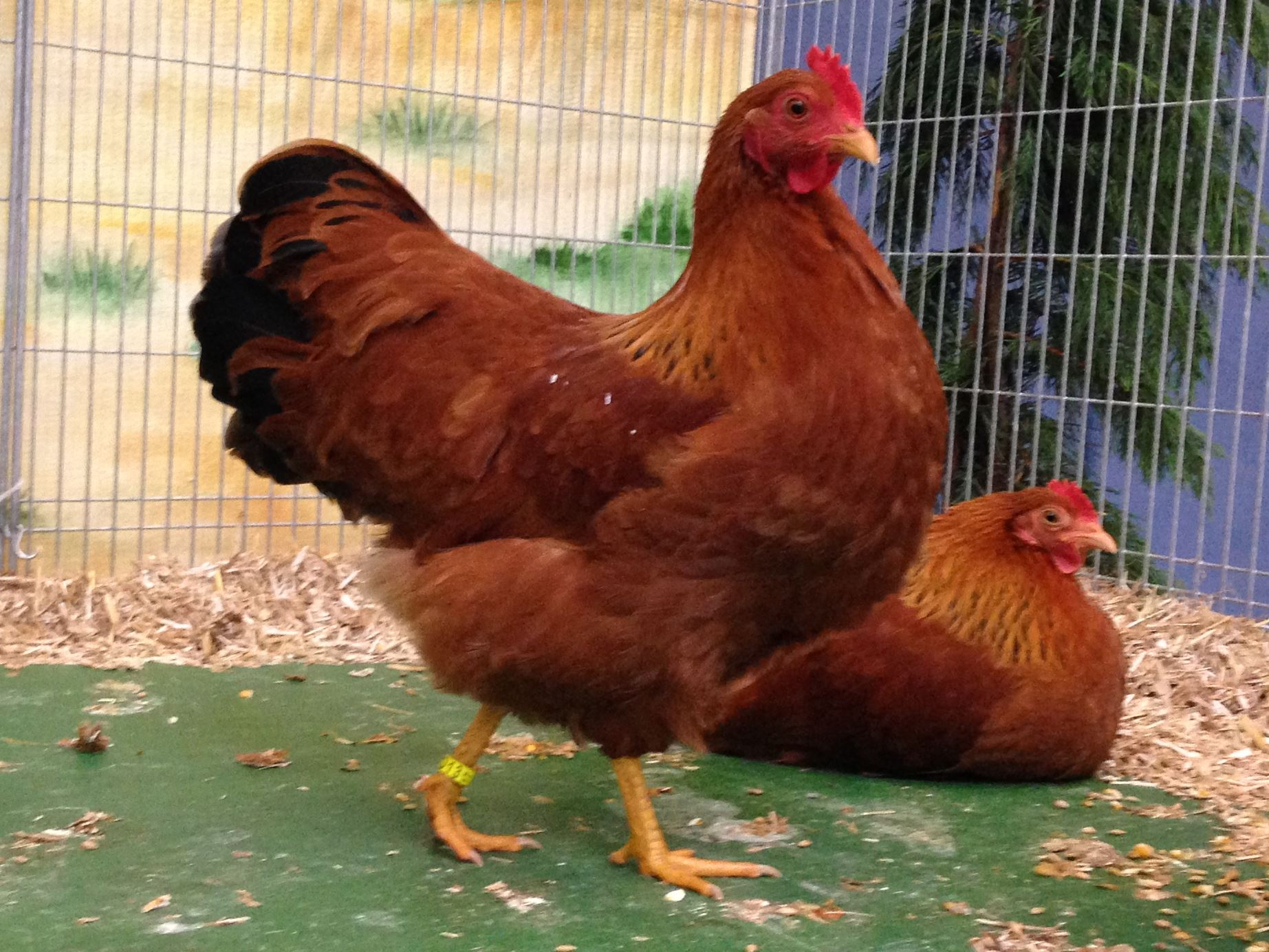
Bantam hens

== Use ==
The New Hampshire Red was bred to be a dual-purpose breed, suitable for production of both meat and eggs. It adapts well to either intensive or extensive management, and yields a meaty carcass. Hens lay approximately 220 brown eggs per year, with an average weight of about 55 g; they sit well, and are good mothers.
