= List of native Philippine chicken breeds =

The domestic chicken breeds native to the Philippine islands include:

Name	Image	Notes
Banaba		From Batangas province, Calabarzon.
Bolinao		Found in Pangasinan province, Ilocos Region.
Camarines		From Bicol region. Used for cock-fighting.
Darag		From Panay Island, Visayas.
Joloanon		
Paraoakan or Parawakan		From Palawan, in Mimaropa region. Black, used for cock-fighting.
