= KRT75 =

Gene involved in hair shaft structure in mice

Identifiers
- Aliases: KRT75, K6HF, KB18, PFB, keratin 75, CK-75, hK6hf, K75
- External IDs: OMIM: 609025; MGI: 1923500; GeneCards: KRT75

Gene location (Human)
Chr.	Chromosome 12 (human)
Band	12q13.13	Start	52,424,070 bp
Band	12q13.13	End	52,434,371 bp

Gene location (Mouse)
Chr.	Chromosome 15 (mouse)
Band	15 F2|15 56.91 cM	Start	101,471,780 bp
Band	15 F2|15 56.91 cM	End	101,482,339 bp
RNA expression pattern
Bgee	Human / Mouse (ortholog); Top expressed in: hair follicle; skin of abdomen; skin of limb; skin of leg; nipple; mucosa of esophagus; pharynx; cervix; vagina; tonsil / Top expressed in: hair follicle; lip; conjunctival fornix; skin of back; urethra; molar; skin of abdomen; embryo; skin of external ear; cornea; More reference expression data
BioGPS	n/a
Gene ontology
Molecular function	structural molecule activity
Cellular component	keratin filament; extracellular exosome; intracellular anatomical structure; intermediate filament; cytosol
Biological process	hematopoietic progenitor cell differentiation; keratinization; cornification
Sources:Amigo / QuickGO
Orthologs
Databases	NCBI: entry; OMA: entry
Species	Human	Mouse
Entrez	9119	109052
Ensembl	ENSG00000170454	ENSMUSG00000022986
UniProt	O95678	Q8BGZ7
RefSeq (mRNA)	NM_004693	NM_133357
RefSeq (protein)	NP_004684	NP_579935
Location (UCSC)	Chr 12: 52.42 – 52.43 Mb	Chr 15: 101.47 – 101.48 Mb
PubMed search
- Wikidata
View/Edit Human	View/Edit Mouse

Keratin, type II cytoskeletal 75 is a protein that in humans is encoded by the KRT75 gene. It is a type of keratin involved in hair shaft structure in mice. In chickens, mutations in KRT75 cause animals to have frizzled feathers.
