= Polish chicken =

European breed of crested chicken

Polish
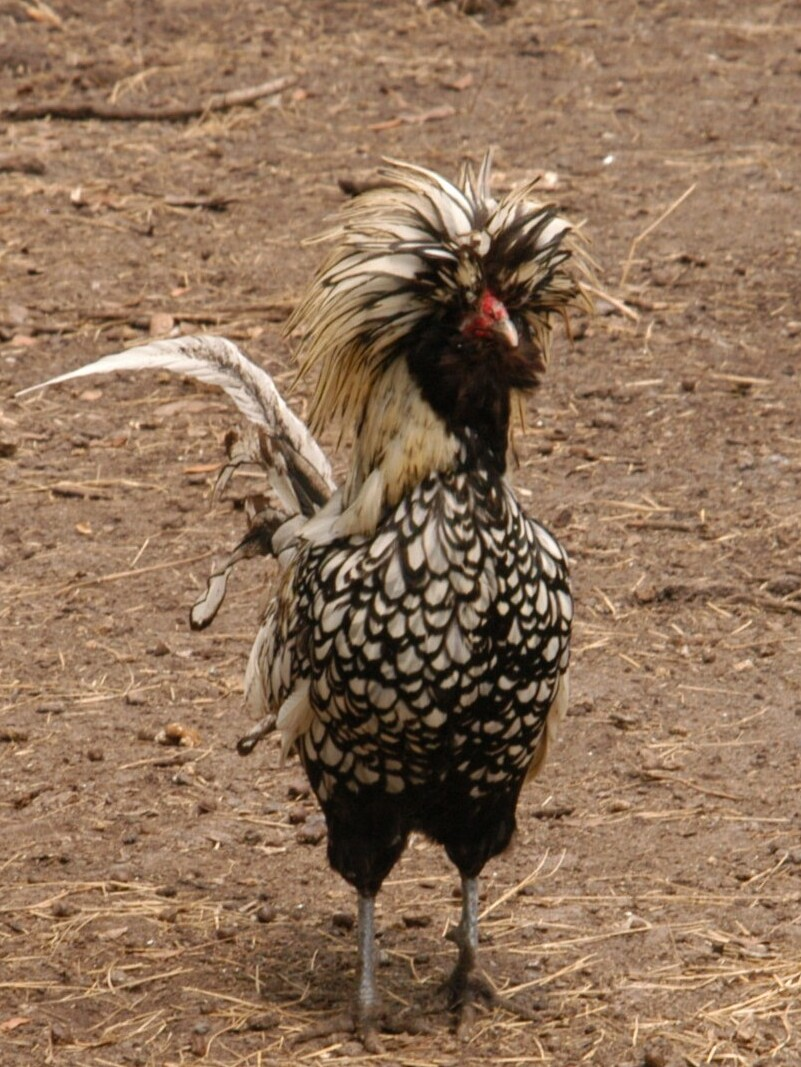
- A silver-laced cock

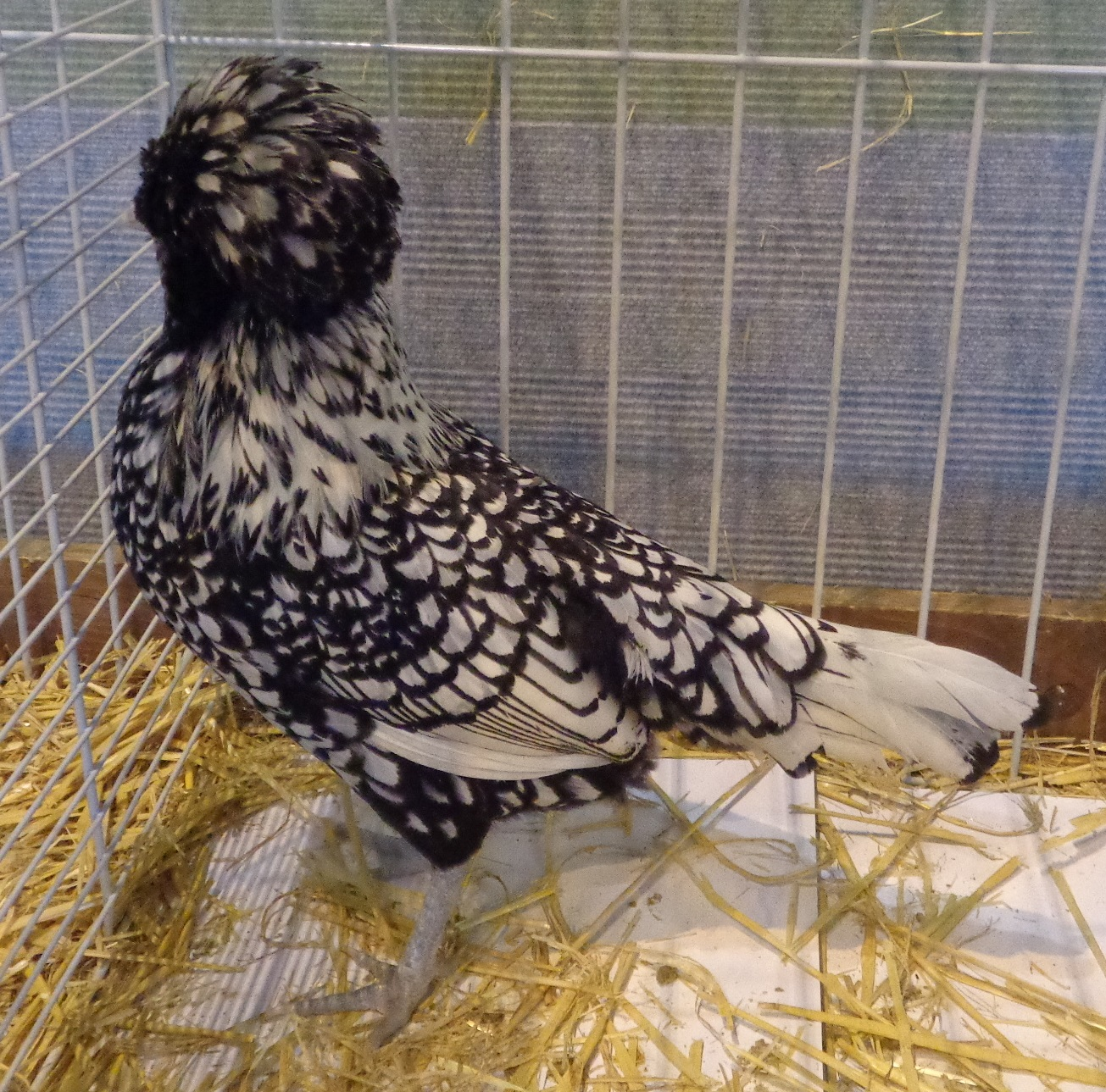
- Silver-laced hen
- Other names: Poland

Traits
- Weight: Male: Standard: 2.75 kg; Bantam: 850 g; Female: Standard: 2 kg; Bantam: 740 g
- Egg color: white
- Comb type: v-shaped

Classification
- APA: continental
- ABA: all other combs, clean legged
- Chicken; Gallus gallus domesticus

The Polish or Poland is a European breed of crested chicken. Its origins are unknown; similar birds are shown in fifteenth-century images from Italy and the Netherlands. The breed was officially recognised in the 16th century.

The birds have a small v-shaped comb and an abundant crest of feathers on the crown of the head. They are kept for show or for ornament. There are bearded, non-bearded and frizzle varieties.

== Etymology ==
The origins of the name of the breed are uncertain. It could have been named after the country of Poland. Its name could have also come from the Middle Dutch word pol 'head' (compare origin of poll tax), in reference to its domed skull.

In some European countries the breed is known as "Dutch crest fowl" in the respective languages. In Poland it is known as the Czubatka Polska ('Polish crest fowl'); the old type of the breed is known as the Czubatka Staropolska ('old Polish crest fowl').

== History ==
Though the derivation of the Polish breed is unclear, one theory suggests that their ancestors were brought by Asian Mongols to Central and Eastern Europe during medieval times, and thus, could have originated in Poland. Crested chickens are seen in paintings from the 15th century, and in Dutch and Italian paintings from the sixteenth to eighteenth centuries.

Though usually only a fair layer at best today, in France they were formerly kept for their eggs. Three colour varieties were included in the first edition of the Standard of Perfection in 1874; additional varieties were added in 1883, 1938 and 1963.

== Characteristics ==
The Polish has a small v-shaped comb, which may be hidden by the crest. The earlobes and wattles are small and may also be completely hidden. Some varieties possess "beards" and thus may also hide the appearance of the wattles. The earlobes are white, the comb and wattles bright red.

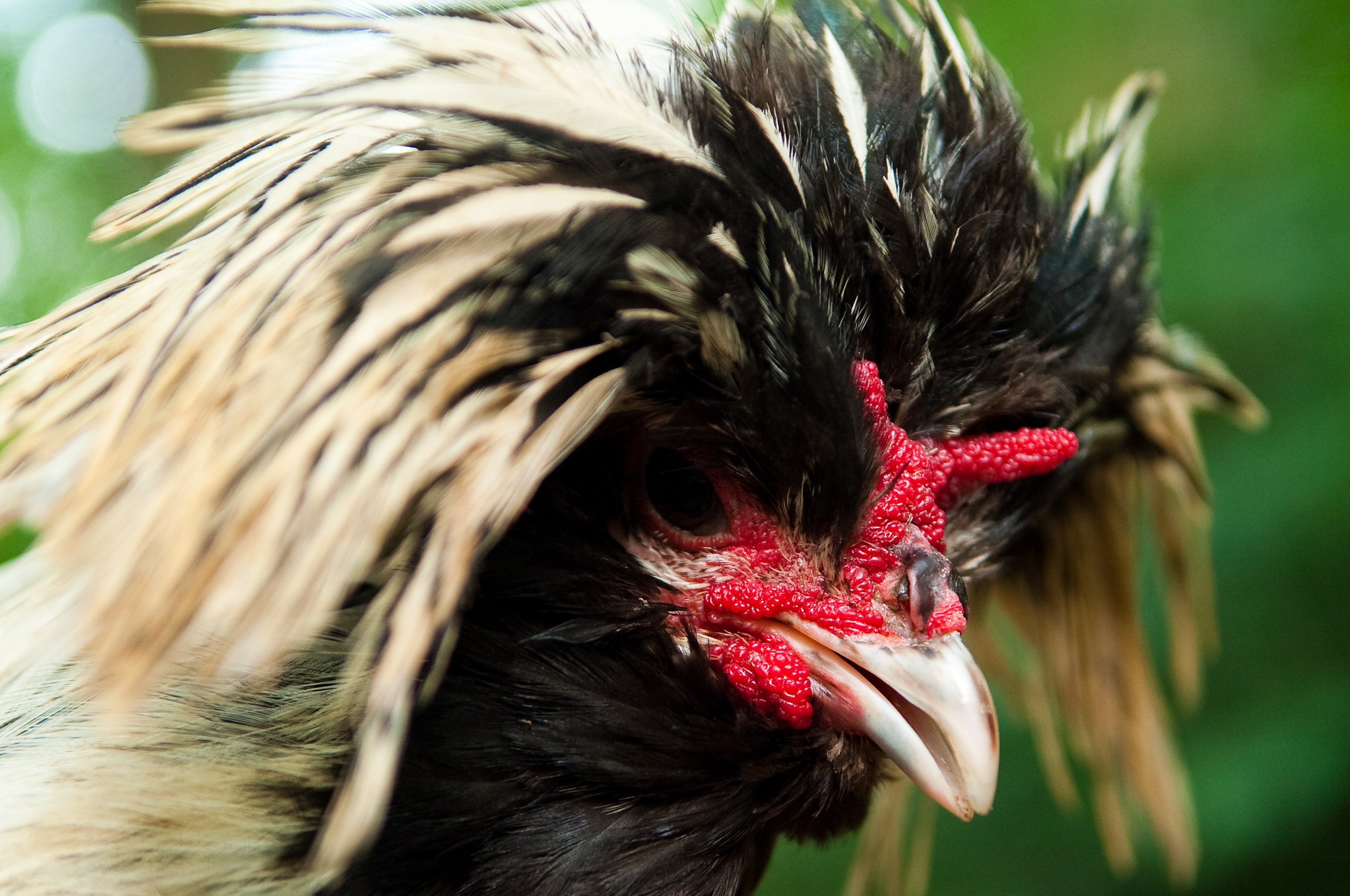
Head of a silver-laced cock

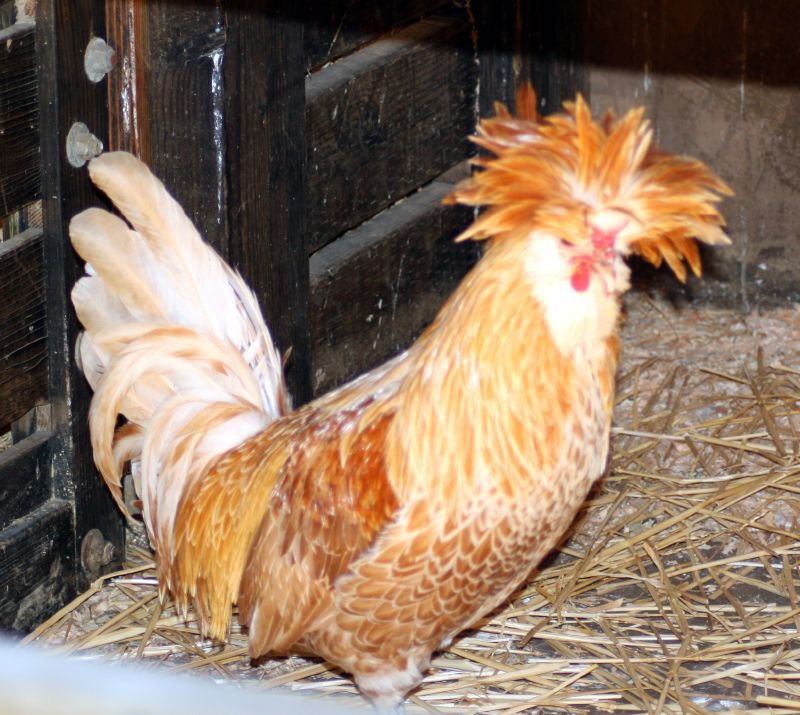
Buff-laced cock

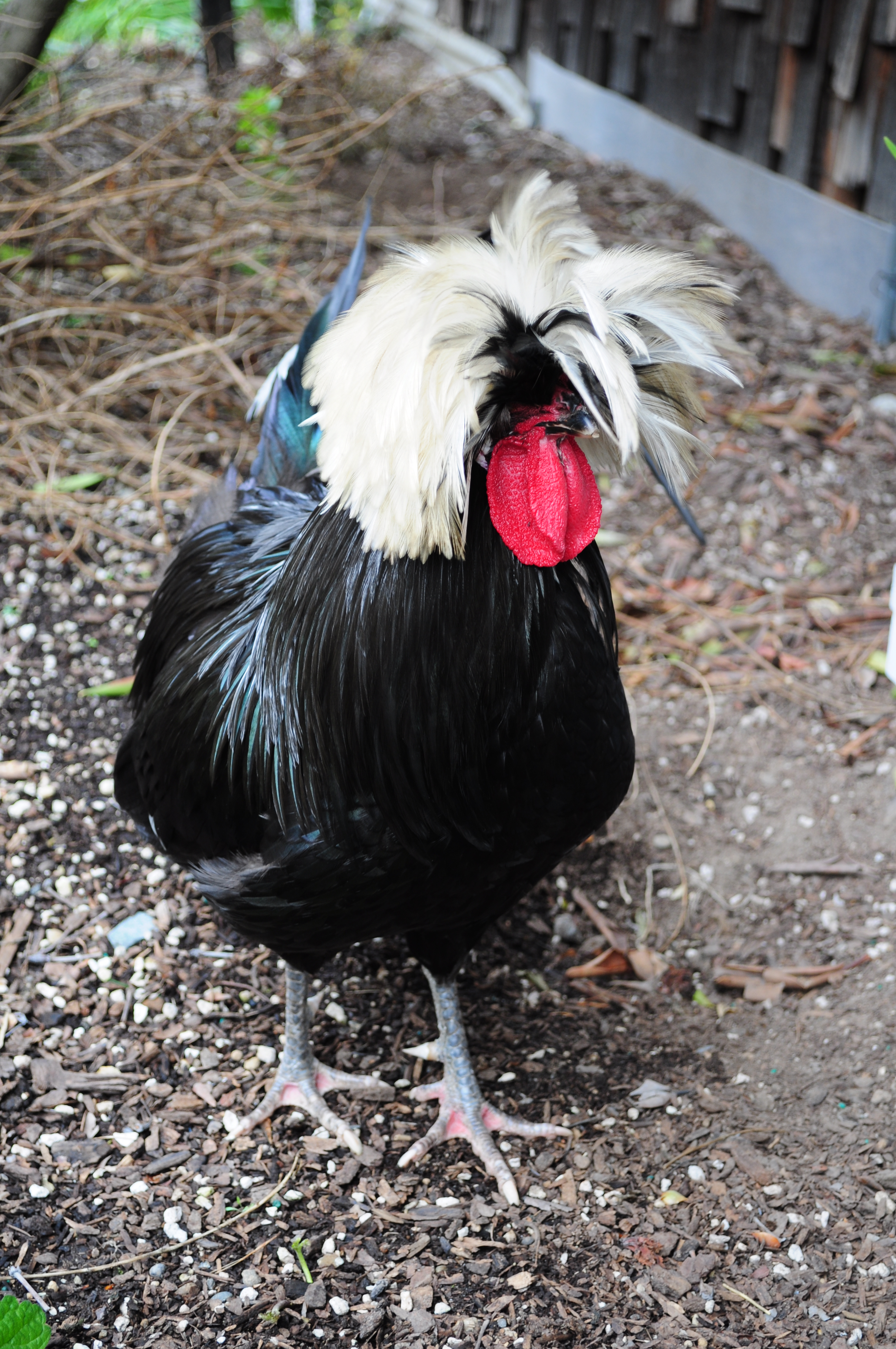
White-crested black cock

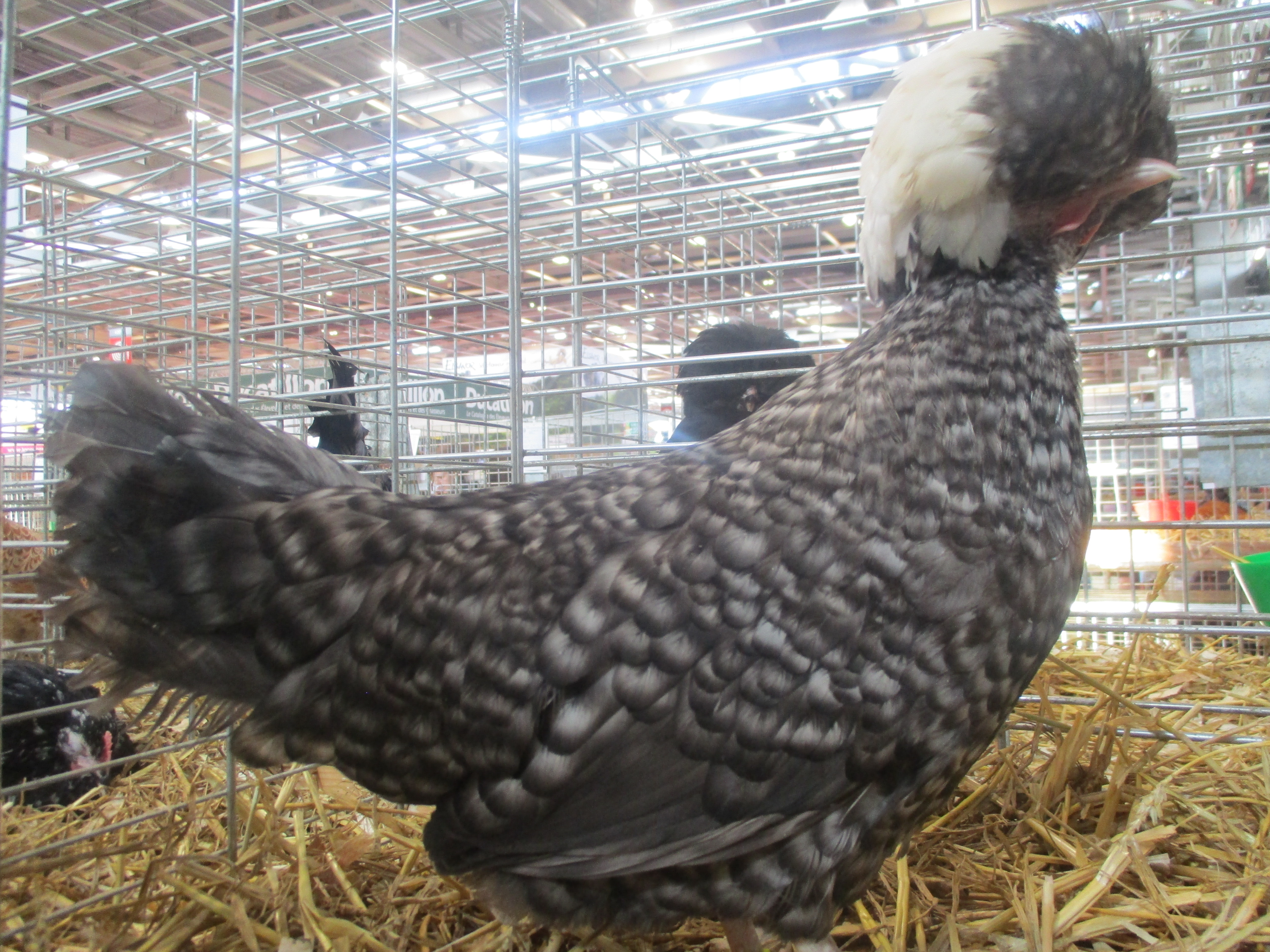
White-crested barred hen
