= Pekin Bantam =

British breed of bantam chicken

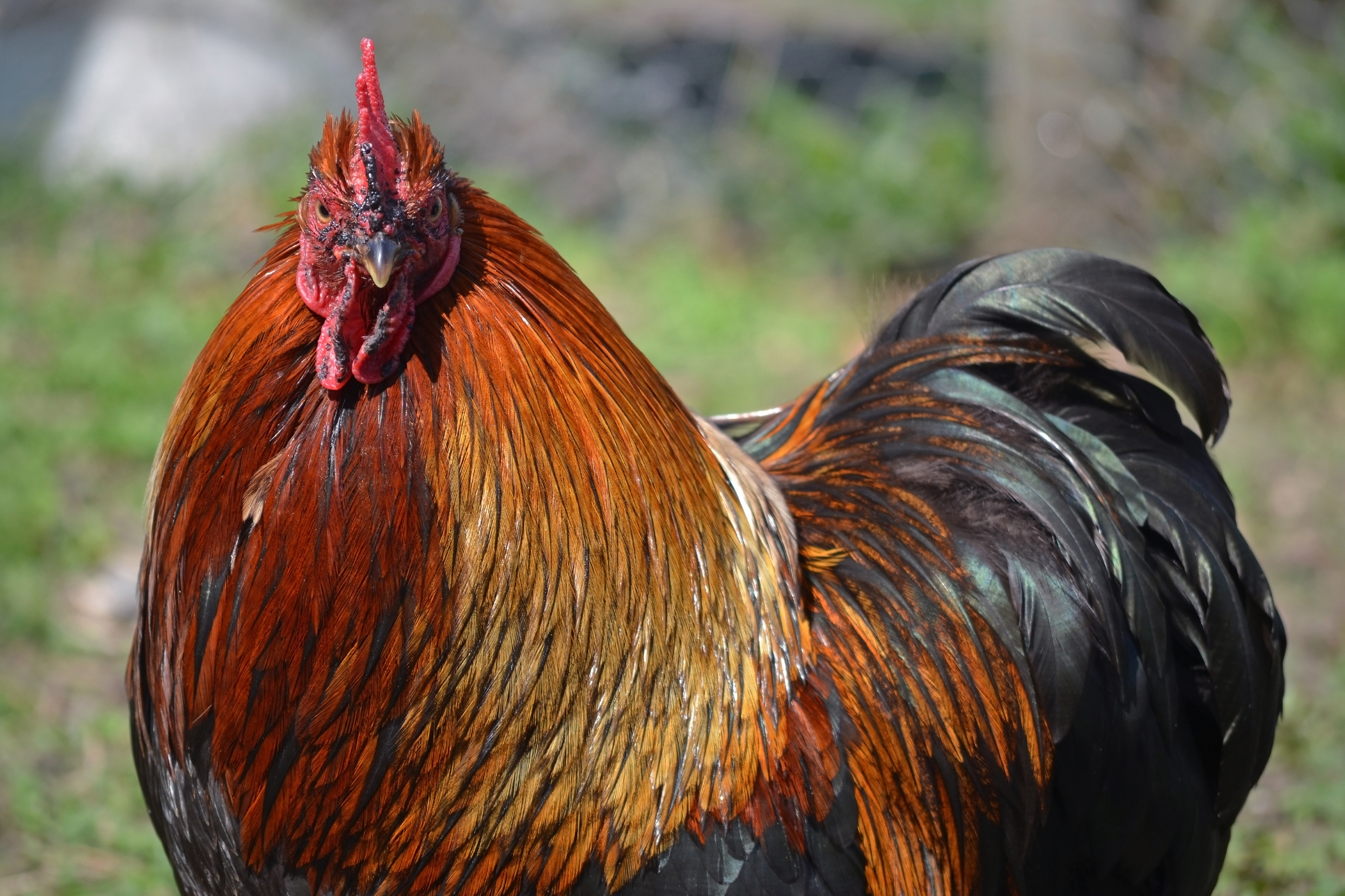
- A Pekin cock
- Conservation status: FAO (2007): not listed; DAD-IS (2020): unknown
- Country of origin: United Kingdom
- Use: ornamental

Traits
- Weight: Male: 680 g; Female: 570 g
- Egg colour: white or cream
- Comb type: single

Classification
- APA: no
- EE: as equivalent of bantam Cochin
- PCGB: true bantam
- Chicken; Gallus gallus domesticus

The Pekin Bantam is a British breed of bantam chicken. It derives from birds brought to Europe from China in the nineteenth century, and is named for the city of Peking where it was believed to have originated. It is a true bantam, with no corresponding large fowl. It is recognised only in the United Kingdom, where the Cochin has no recognised bantam version; like the Cochin, it has heavy feathering to the legs and feet. The Entente Européenne treats the Pekin Bantam as equivalent to the bantam Cochin.

== History ==
The first Pekins are alleged to have been looted from the private collection of the Emperor of China at Peking (now known as Beijing) by British soldiers towards the end of the Second Opium War around 1860. However, some sources suggest that a consignment of birds from China around 1835 were given to Queen Victoria, assuming the name of 'Shanghais' and that these birds were bred with further imports and were developed into the breed we know today as Pekins. The Pekins first brought to the United Kingdom are said to have been buff in colour, with blacks and cuckoos arriving later on. They are known in the United States and Canada as Cochin Bantams.

== Characteristics ==
The Pekin is a true bantam, a bantam chicken with no large fowl counterpart. It is recognised only in the United Kingdom, where the Cochin has no recognised bantam version; in other European countries it is treated as the bantam of the Cochin, to which it is not closely related. Twelve colour varieties are recognised: barred, birchen, black, blue, buff, Columbian, cuckoo, lavender, mottled, partridge, silver partridge and white.

== Gallery ==
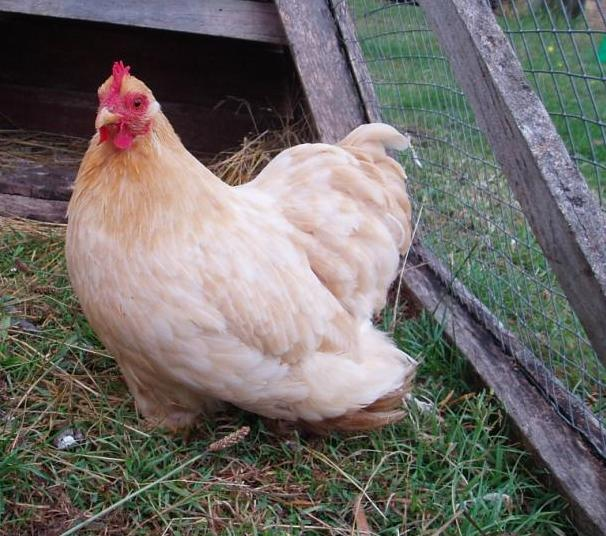
A red-lavender hen

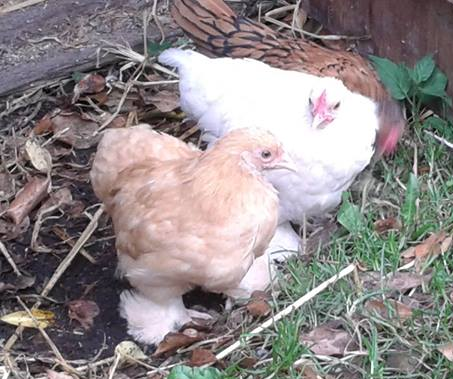
Buff pullet and white cockerel

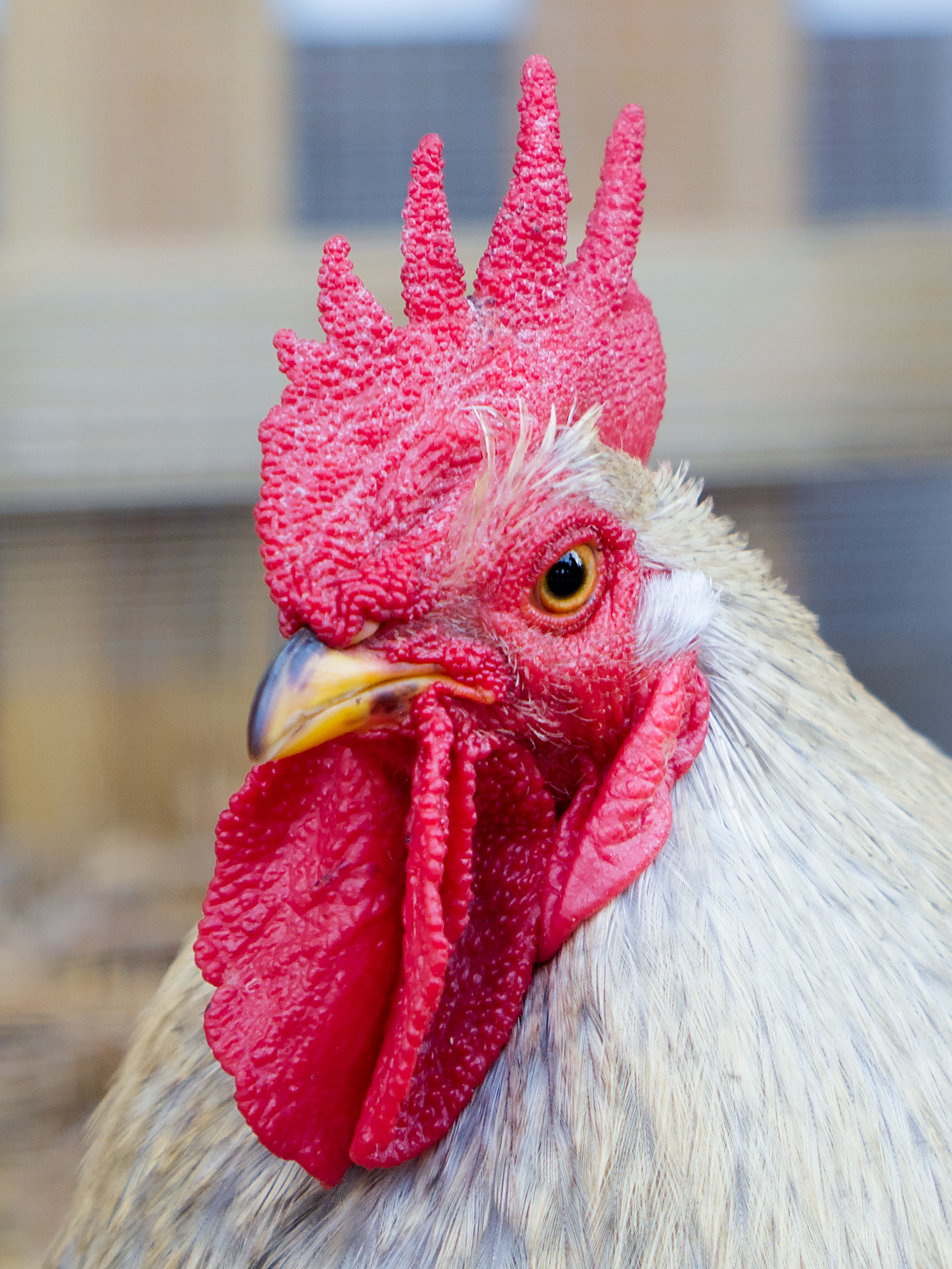
Head of a cock

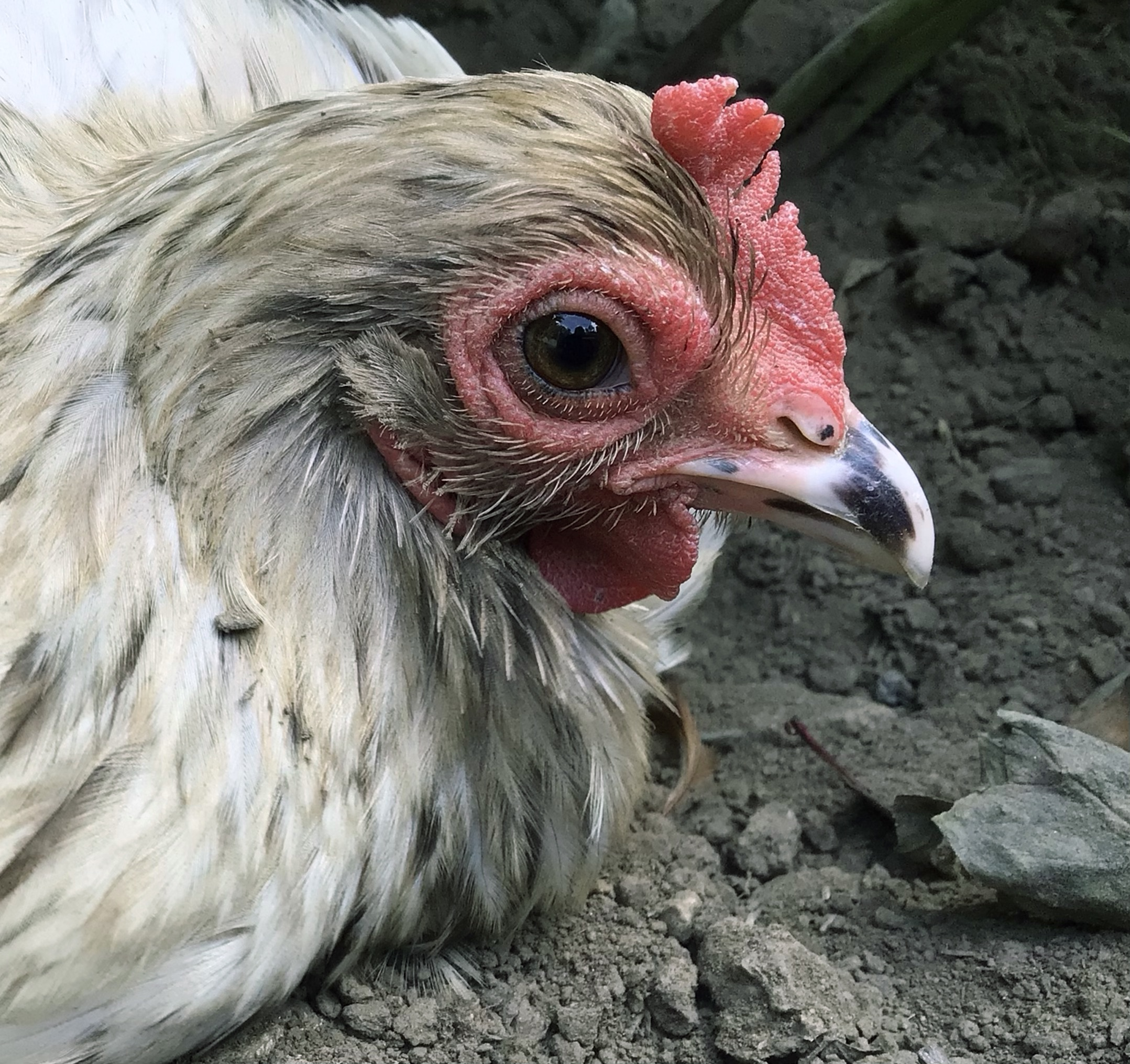
Face of a pullet

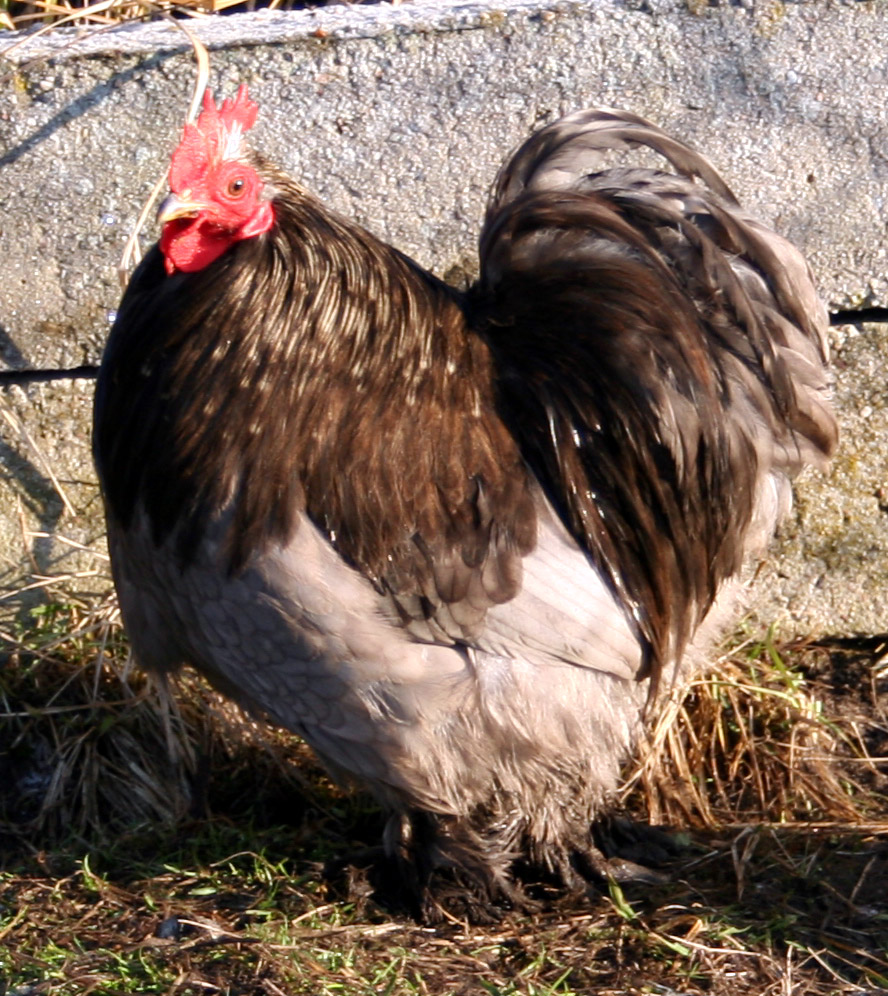
Blue cock

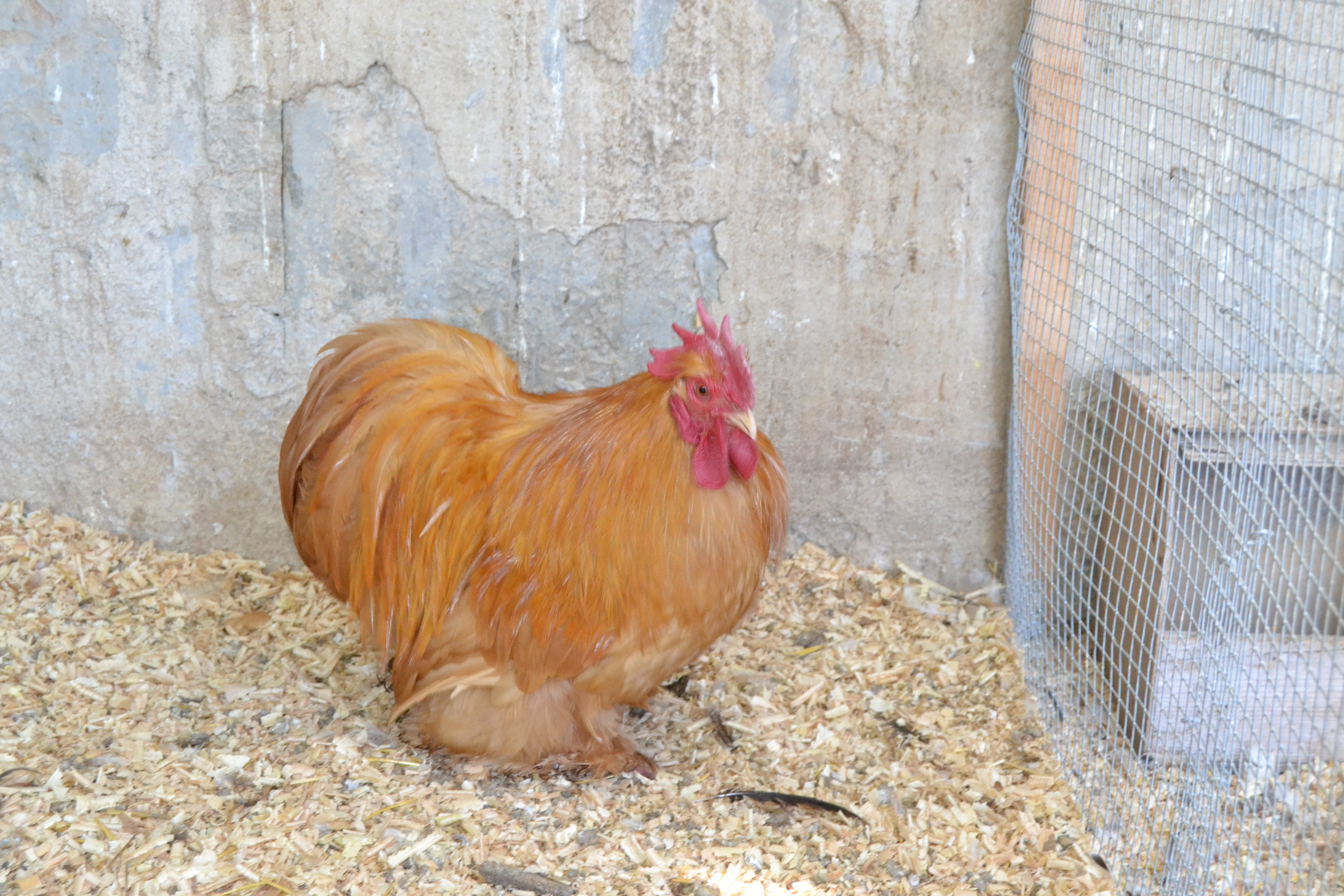
Buff cock

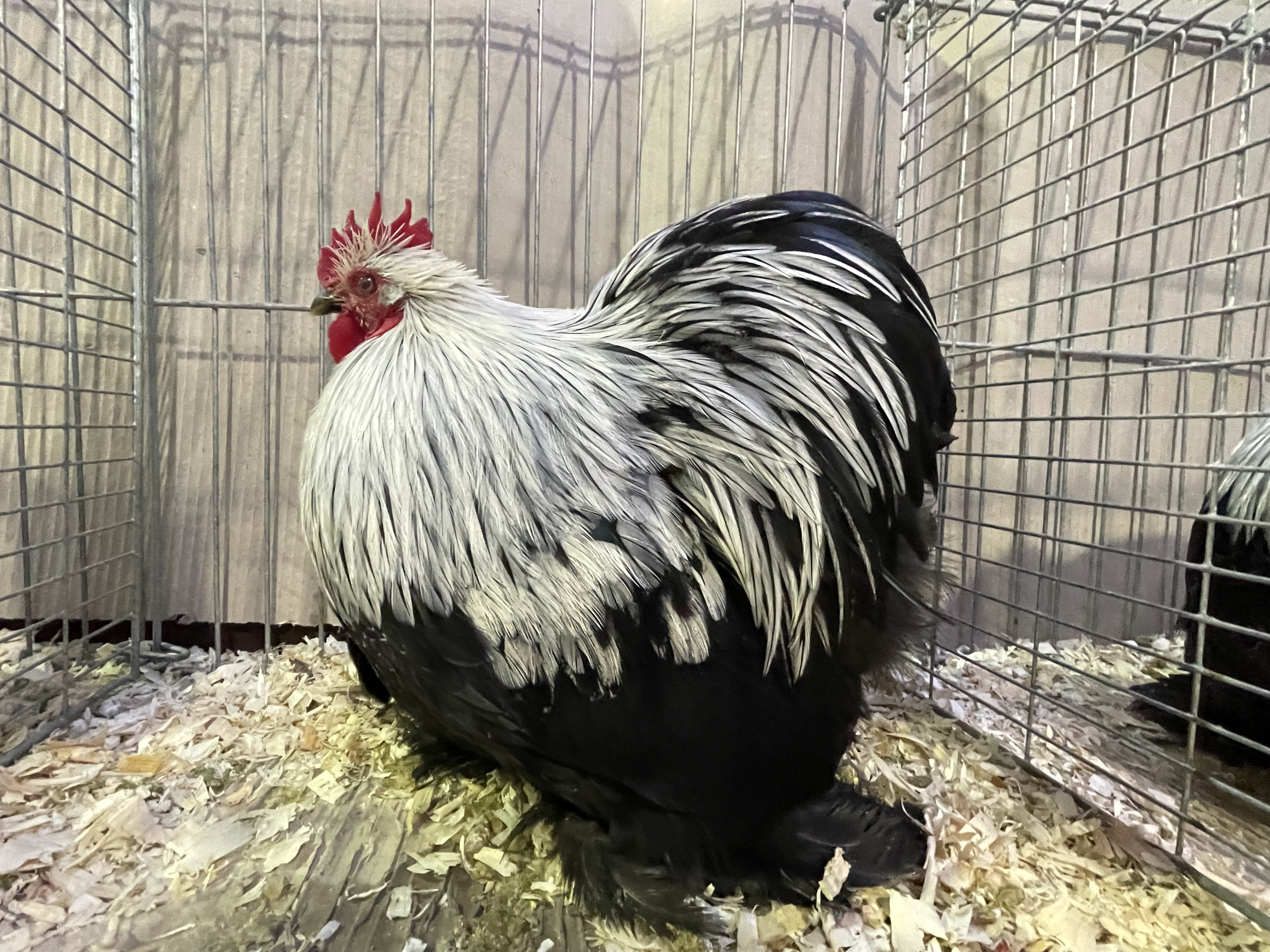
Silver-birchen cock

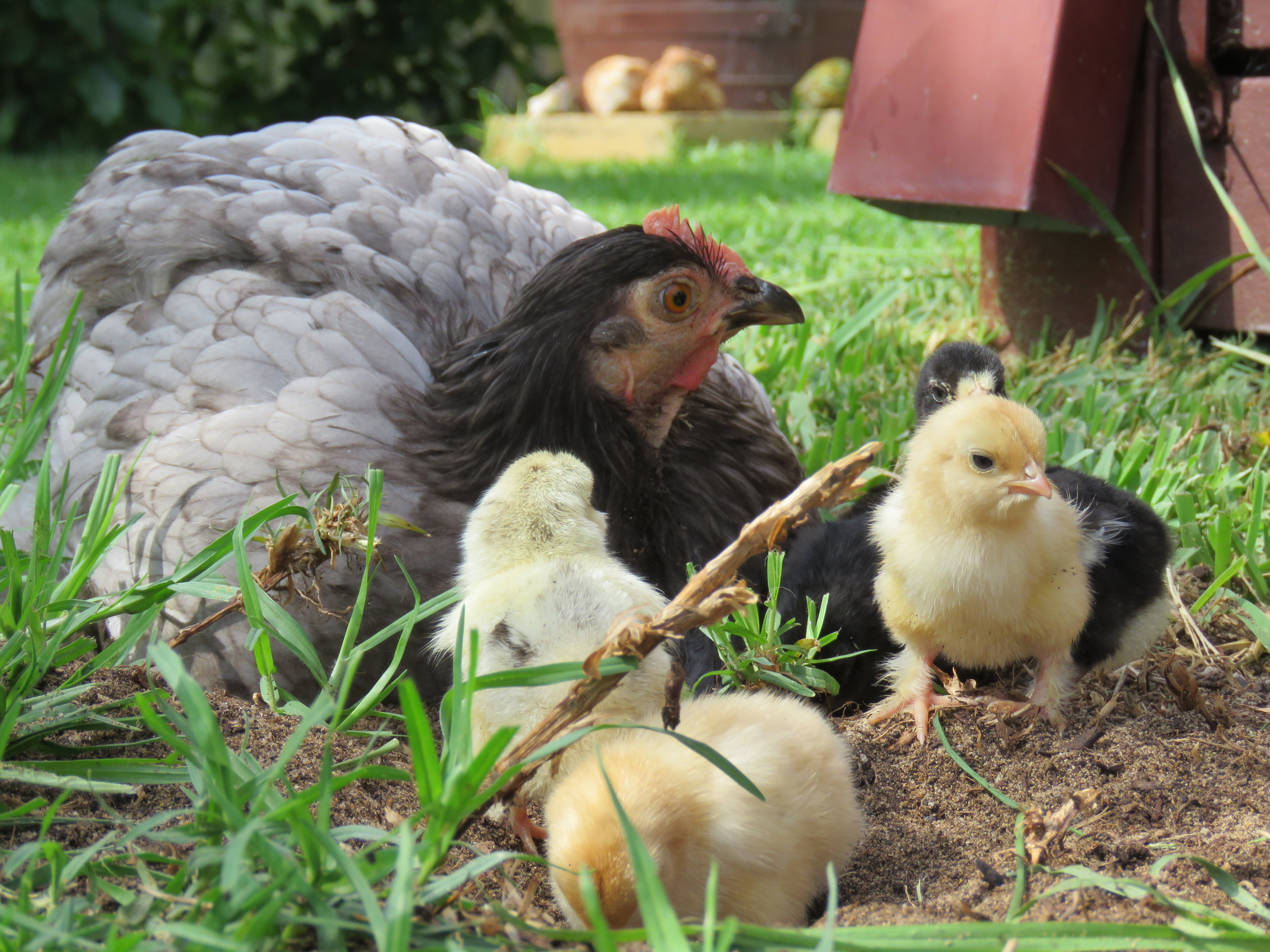
Blue hen and her chicks

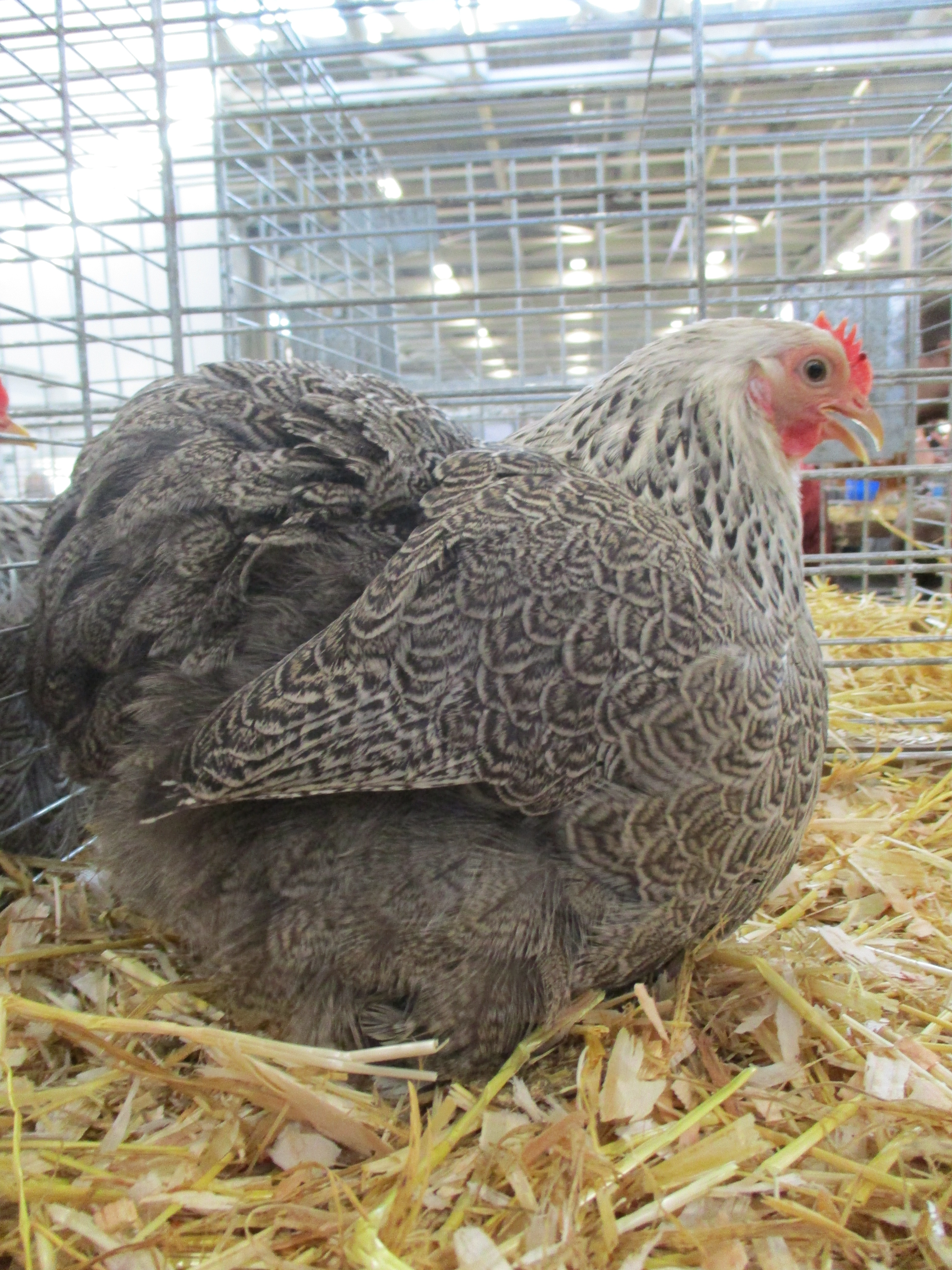
Silver-penciled hen
