= Leghorn chicken =

Italian breed of chicken

Leghorn
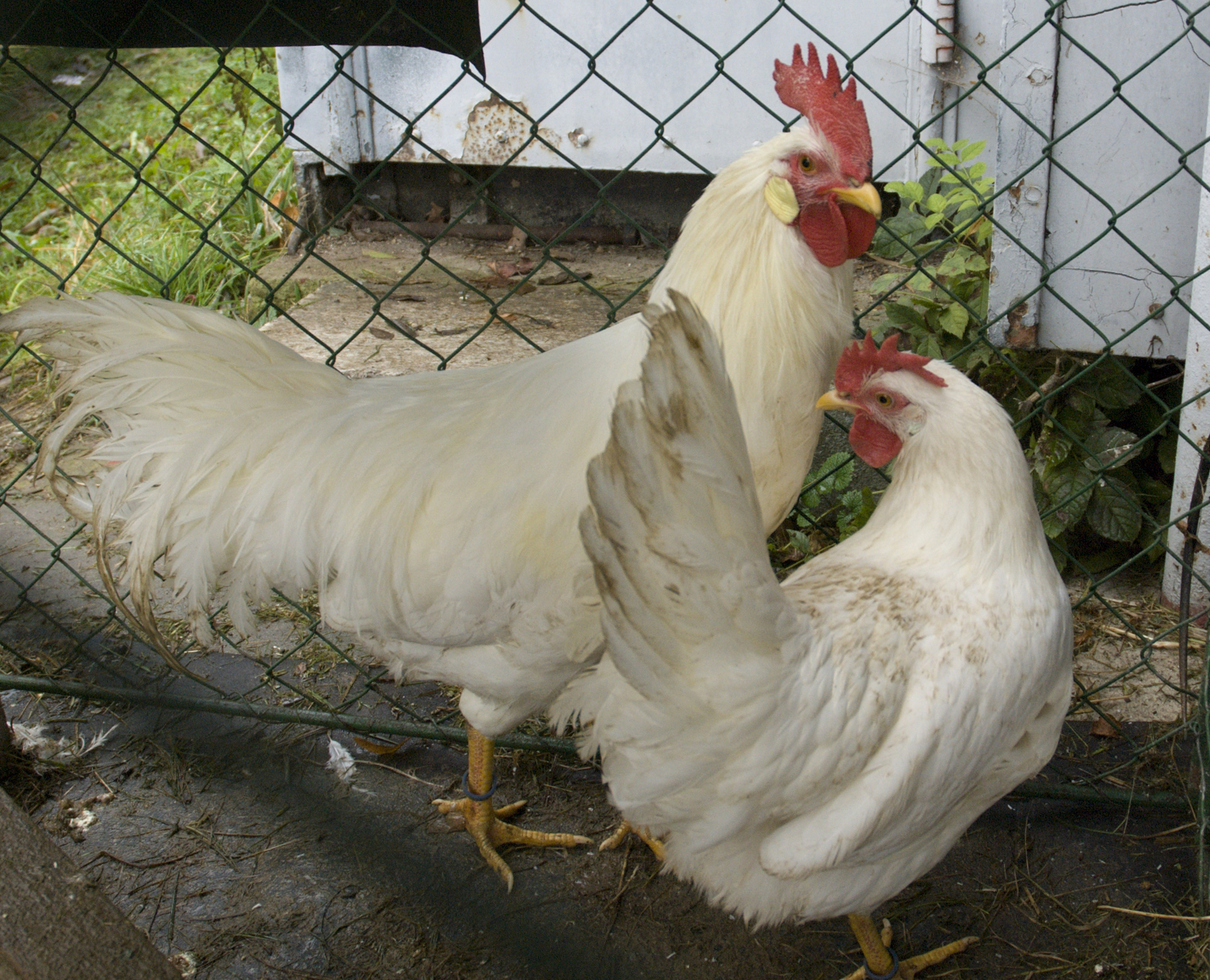
- Cockerel and hen
- Conservation status: FAO 2007: not at risk
- Other names: Livorno; Livornese
- Use: eggs

Traits
- Weight: Male: 2.4–3.4 kg; Female: 2.0–2.5 kg
- Skin colour: yellow
- Egg colour: white
- Comb type: single or rose

Classification
- APA: Mediterranean
- EE: yes
- PCGB: soft feather: light
- Chicken; Gallus gallus domesticus

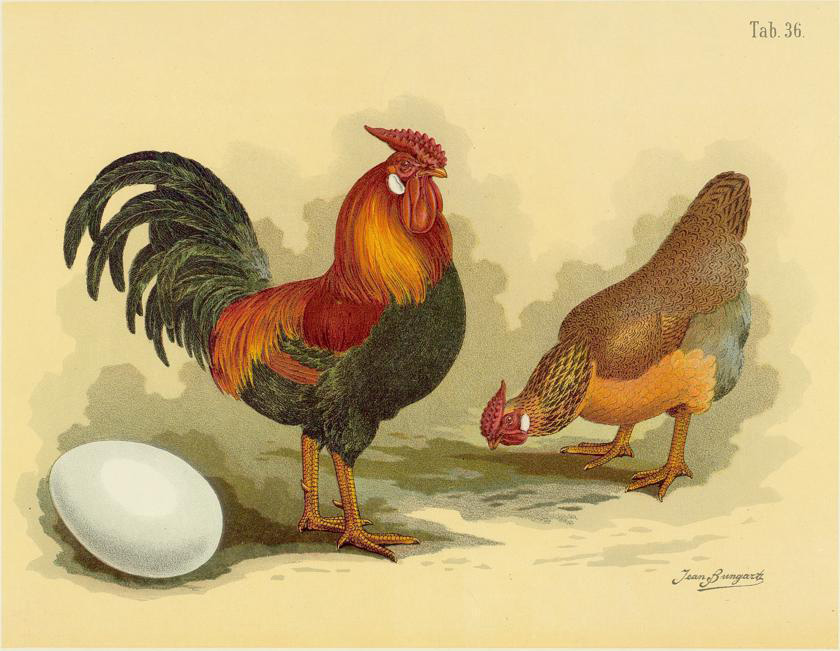
Rose-combed brown cock and hen, illustration from the Geflügel-Album of Jean Bungartz

The Leghorn (Note: US: /ˈlɛɡhɔːrn/ LEG-horn, UK: /lɛˈɡɔːrn/ leg-ORN), Italian: Livorno or Livornese, is an Italian breed of chicken originating in Tuscany, in central Italy. Birds were exported to North America in about 1828 from the port city of Livorno, on the Tuscan coast. They were initially called "Italians", but by 1865 the breed was known as "Leghorn", the traditional English name of the city. The breed was introduced to Britain from the United States in 1870. White Leghorns are commonly used as layer chickens in many countries of the world. Other colour varieties are less common.

== History ==
The origins of the Leghorn are not clear; it appears to derive from light breeds originating in rural Tuscany. The name comes from Leghorn, the traditional anglicisation of Livorno, the Tuscan port from which the first birds were exported to North America. The date of the earliest exports is variously reported as 1828, "about 1830" and 1852. The birds were initially known as "Italians"; they were first referred to as "Leghorns" in 1865, in Worcester, Massachusetts.

The Leghorn was included in The Standard of Excellence as adopted by the American Poultry Society of A.M. Halsted in 1867 in two colours: white (both single- and rose-combed) and Dominique. Three colours – black, white and brown (light and dark) – were included in the American Standard of Perfection in 1874. Rose-combed light and dark brown were added in 1883, and rose-combed white in 1886. Single-combed buff and silver followed in 1894, and red, black-tailed red, and Columbian in 1929. In 1981 rose-combed black, buff, silver, and golden duckwing were added.

Some white Leghorns that had won first prize at the 1868 New York Show were imported to Britain in 1870, and brown birds from 1872; some were later re-exported to Italy. These birds were small, not exceeding 1.6 kg in weight; weight was increased by cross-breeding with Minorca and Malay stock. Pyle Leghorns were bred in Britain in the 1880s; gold and silver duckwings originated there a few years later, from crosses with Phoenix or Japanese Yokohama birds. Buff Leghorns were seen in Denmark in 1885, and in England in 1888.

== Characteristics ==
In Italy, where the Livorno breed standard is recent, ten colour varieties are recognised; there is a separate Italian standard for the German Leghorn variety, the Italiana (German: Italiener). The Fédération Française des Volailles (the French poultry federation) divides the breed into three types: the Leghorn américaine or American Leghorn, in white only; the Leghorn anglaise or English Leghorn, in six colours; and the Livourne or Italian type, for which twenty-one colour variants are listed for full-size birds, and nineteen for bantams. In the United States ten colours – white, red, black-tailed red, light brown, dark brown, black, buff, Columbian, buff Columbian and silver – are recognised for single-combed large fowl, of which six are also recognised for rose-combed birds; colours for bantams are the same, with the addition only of single-combed barred. In Britain, the Leghorn Club recognises eighteen colours: golden duckwing, silver duckwing, partridge, brown, buff, exchequer, Columbian, pyle, white, black, blue, mottled, cuckoo, blue-red, lavender, red, crele and buff Columbian. The comb is usually single; a rose comb is permitted in some countries, but not in Italy. The legs are bright yellow, and the ear-lobes white.

The Italian standard gives a weight range of 2.4–2.7 kg (5.5–6 lb) for cocks, 2.0–2.3 kg (4.5–5 lb) for hens. According to the British standard, full-grown Leghorn cocks weigh 3.4 kg (7.5 lb) and hens 2.5 kg; for bantams the maximum weight is 1020 g for cocks and 910 g for hens. Ring size for large fowl is 18 mm for cocks and 16 mm for hens; for bantams it is 13 mm and 11 mm respectively.

== Use ==
Leghorns are good layers of white eggs, laying an average of 280 per year and sometimes reaching 300–320, with a weight of at least 55 g. White Leghorns have been much used to create highly productive egg-laying hybrids for commercial and industrial operations.

== Gallery ==
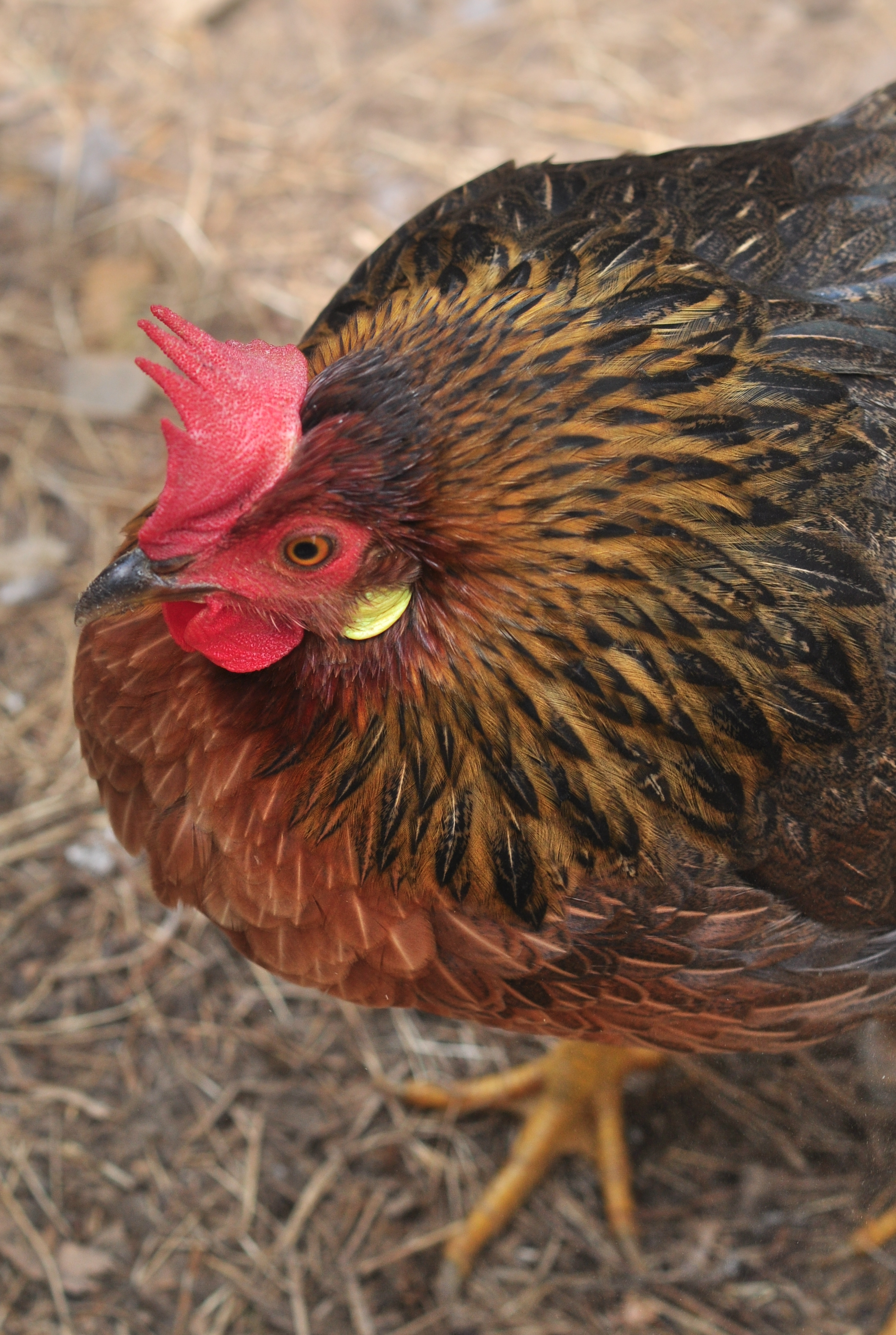
A brown hen

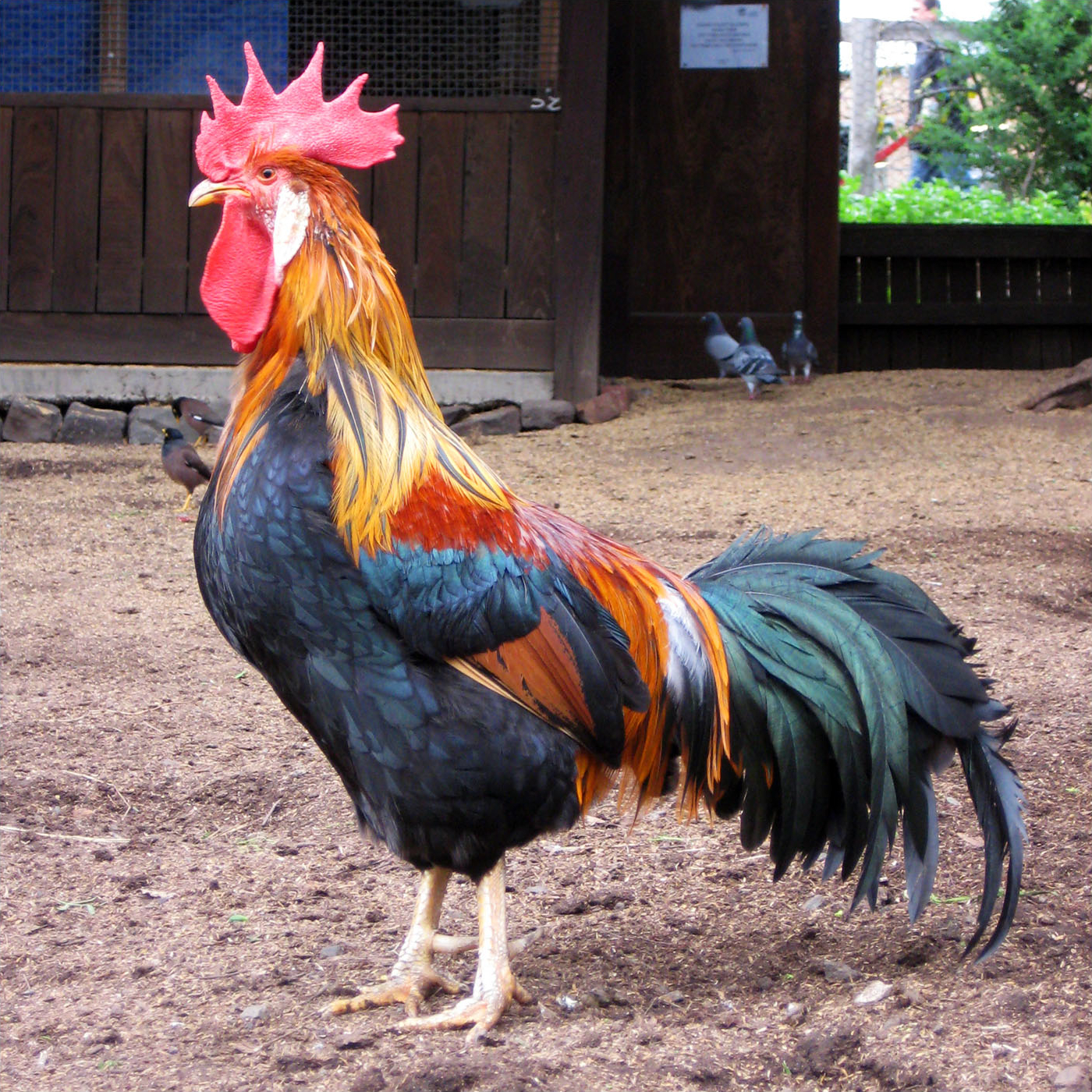
A brown cock

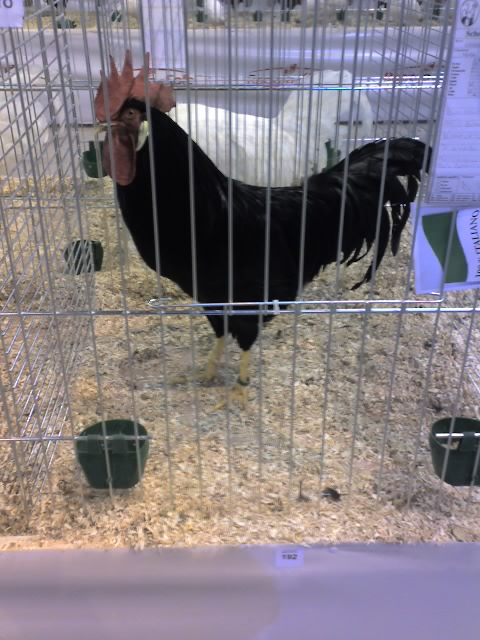
The black

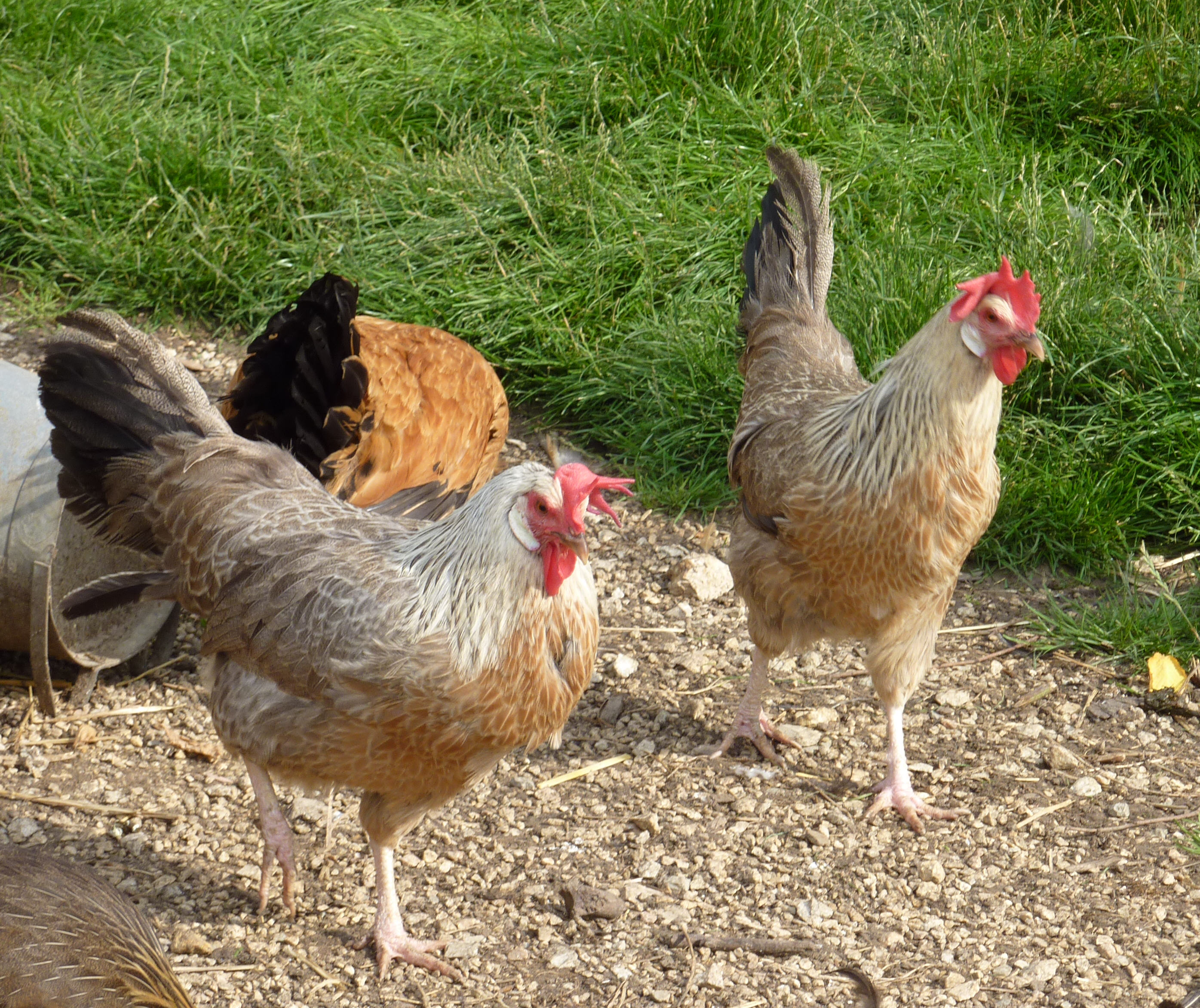
The silver

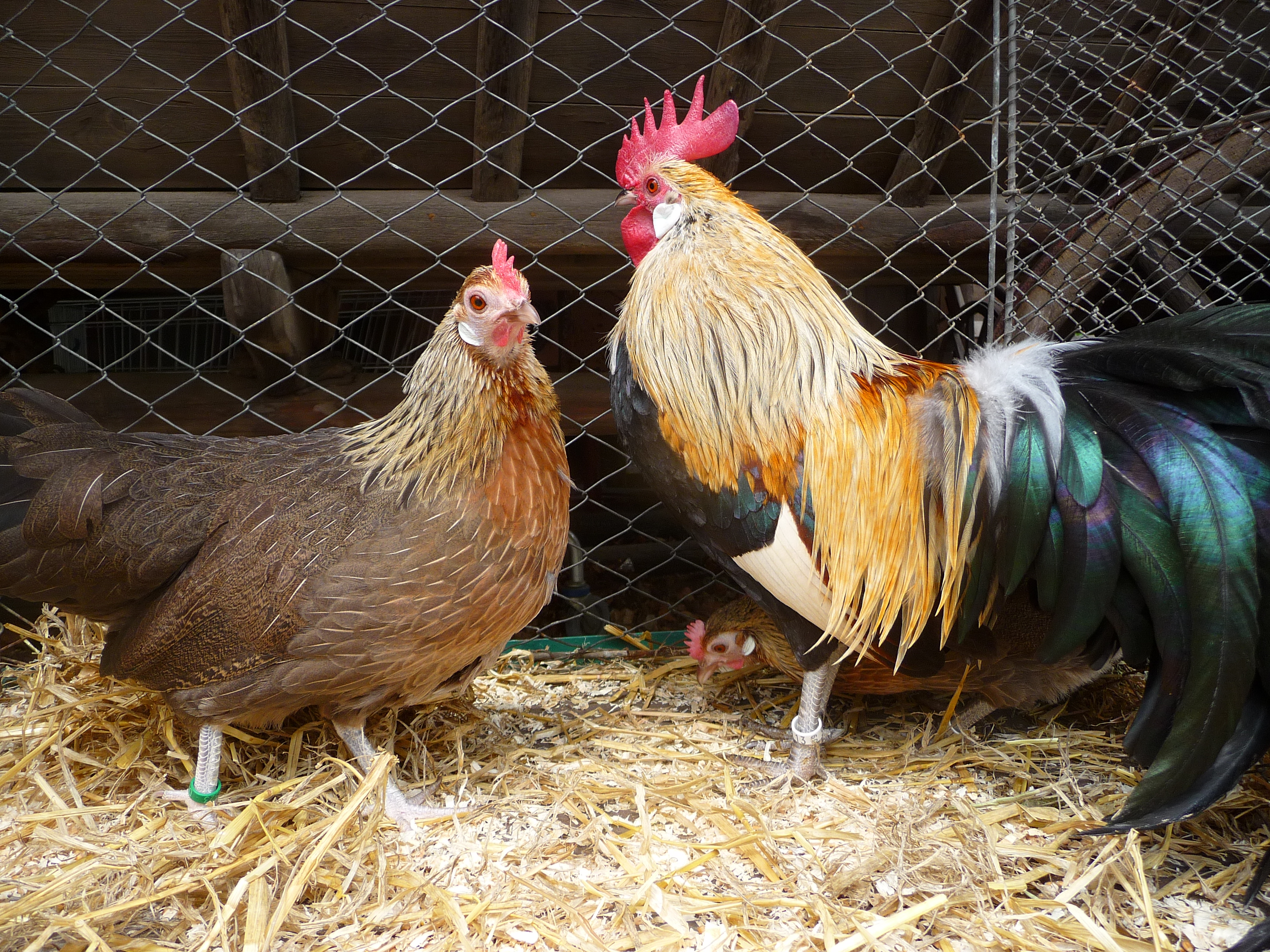
A golden duckwing bantam trio

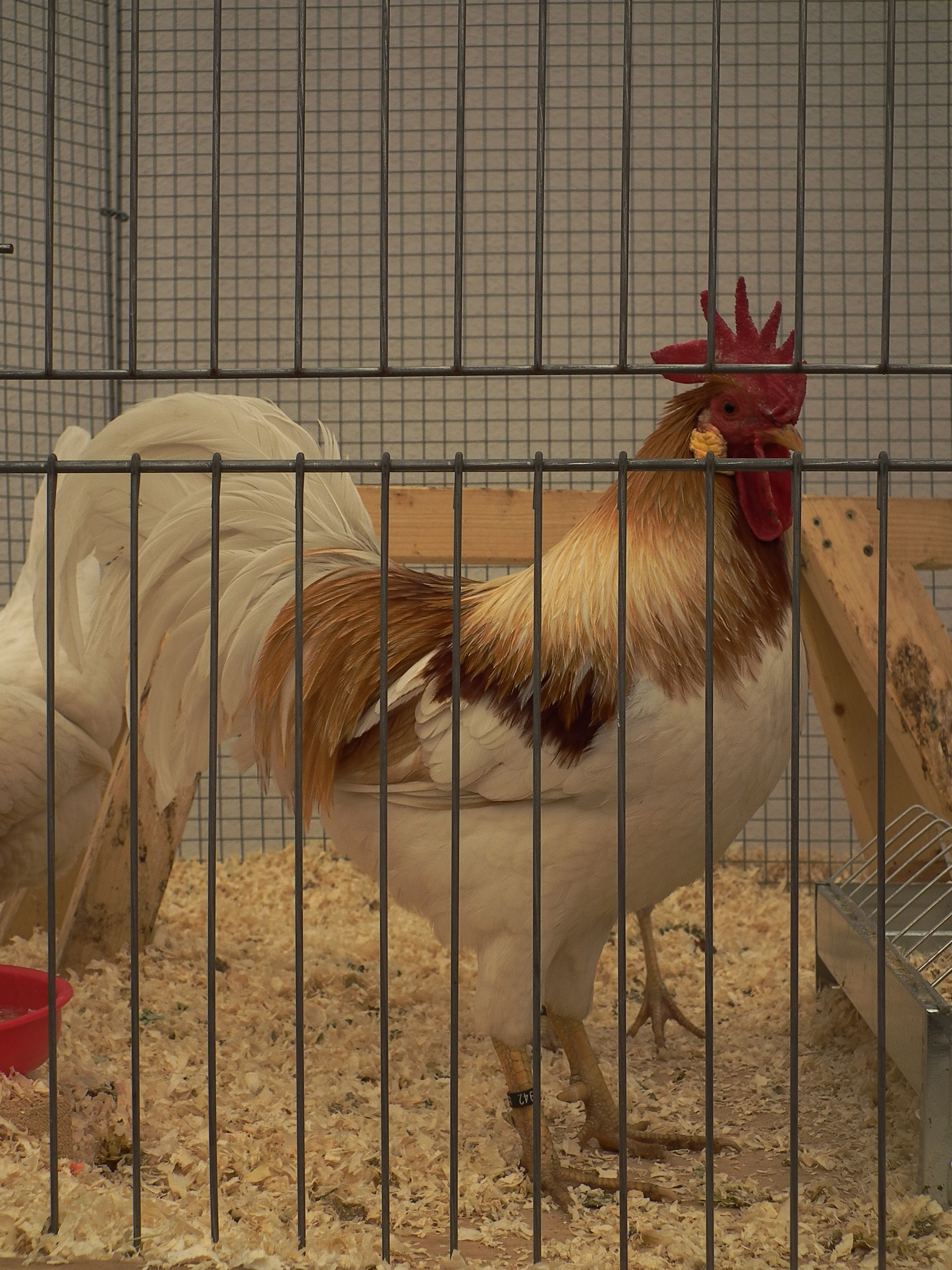
Bantam cock
