= Yokohama (disambiguation) =

Yokohama is the capital city of Kanagawa Prefecture, Japan.

Yokohama may also refer to:

- Yokohama, Aomori, a town located in Aomori Prefecture, Japan
- Yokohama (chicken), a breed of chicken that originated in Germany in the 19th century
- Yokohama (born 1991), a horse jockeyed by Madeleine A. Pickens
- Yokohama Kaidashi Kikou, a Japanese manga series by Hitoshi Ashinano
- Yokohama Rubber Company, a Japanese tire manufacturer
- Linux Kernel 2.6.35 or Yokohama, a computer operating system software version; see List of Linux kernel names
- FM Yokohama, a radio station in Kanagawa Prefecture, Japan
- Ryusei Yokohama (born 1996), a Japanese actor and model
