= Onagadori =

Japanese breed of chicken

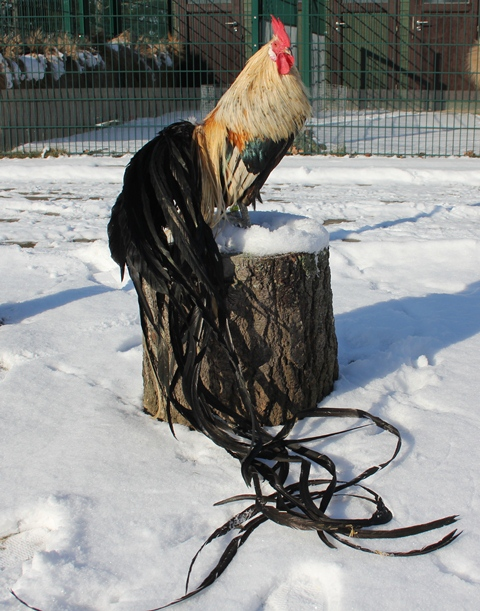
- Gold cock bird

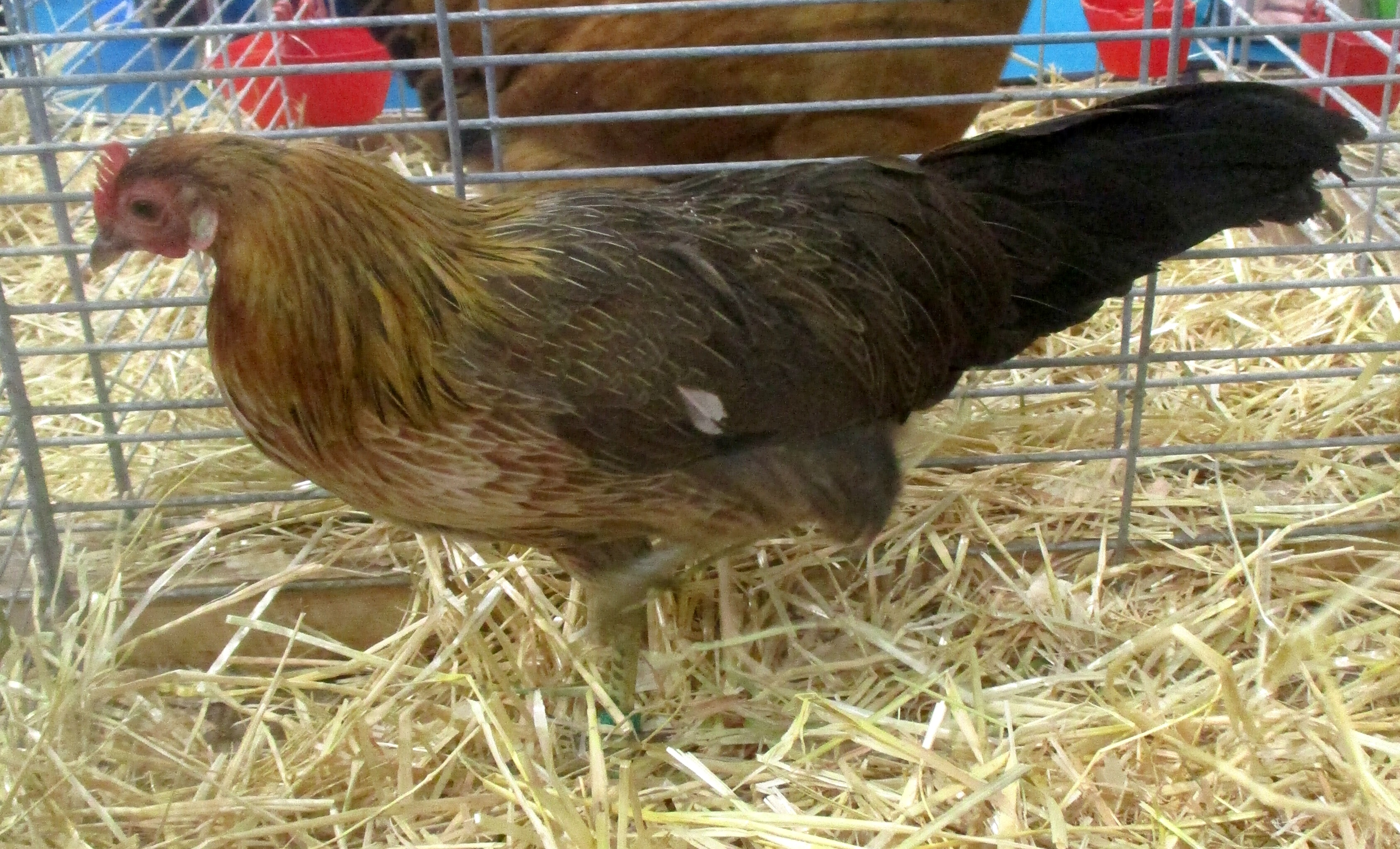
- Hen bird
- Conservation status: endangered
- Country of origin: Japan
- Use: exhibition

Traits
- Comb type: single

Classification
- EE: yes
- PCGB: yes
- Chicken; Gallus gallus domesticus

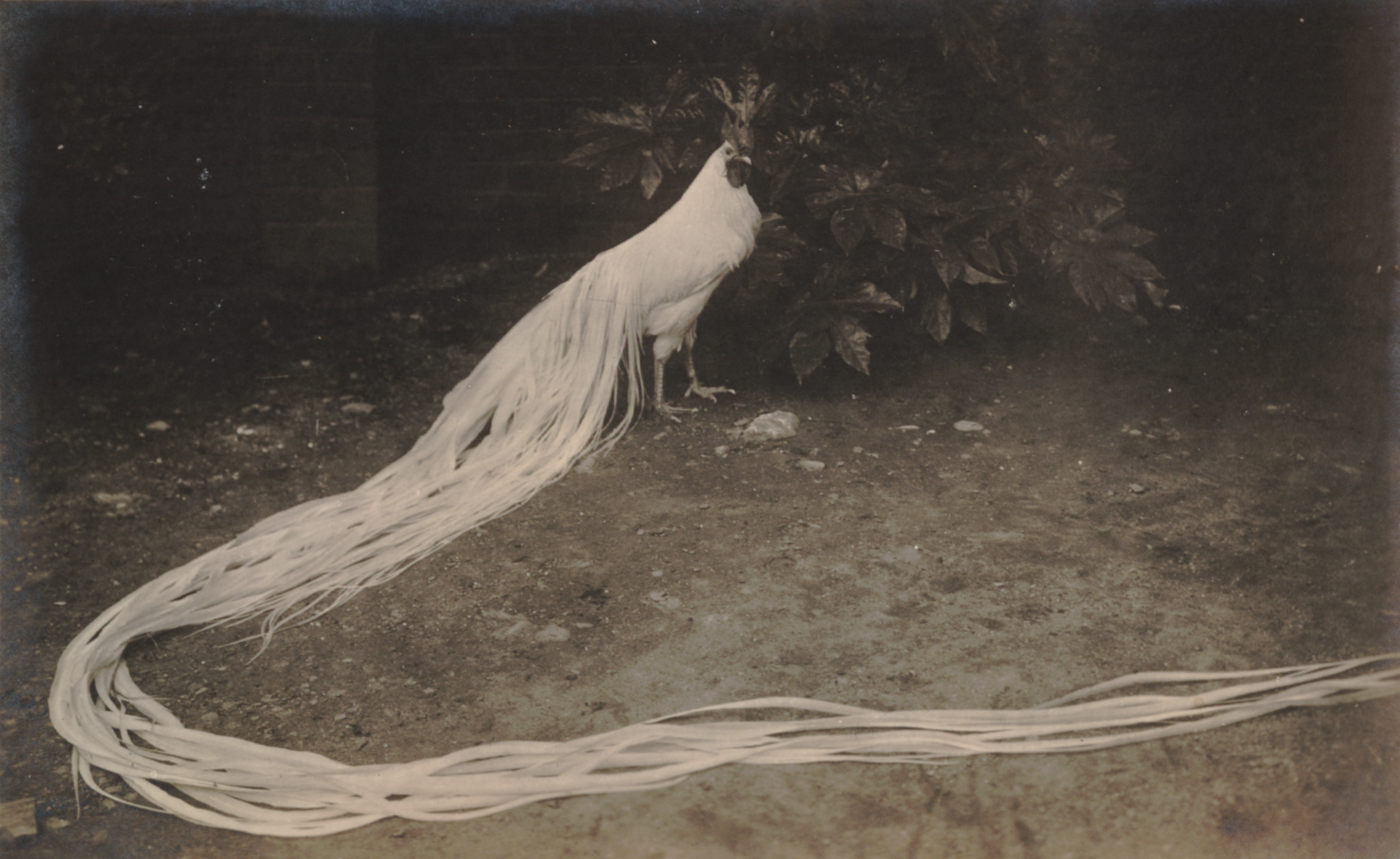
White cock, image from the 1930s

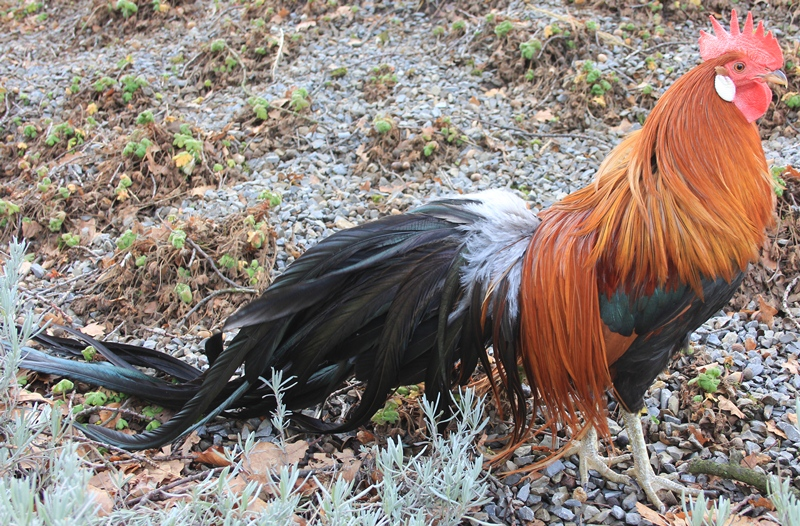
Black-breasted red cock

The Onagadori (Japanese: 尾長鶏, "long-tailed chicken") is a historic Japanese breed of chicken, characterised by an exceptionally long tail. It was bred in the seventeenth century in Kōchi Prefecture, on Shikoku island in southern Japan, and was designated a Japanese National Natural Treasure in 1952. It is one of the ancestors of the German Phoenix breed.

== History ==
The Onagadori was bred in the seventeenth century in Tosa Province, the area that is now Kōchi Prefecture, on Shikoku island in the south-eastern part of the country. It is reared only in that area, mainly in Nankoku. It is believed to have derived from other long-tailed Japanese breeds including the Shokoku, the Totenko and perhaps the Minohiki.

The Onagadori was designated a Special Natural Treasure in 1952. Of the seventeen chicken breeds considered Japanese national treasures, it is the only one to have "special" status.

In 2007 the conservation status of the breed, as reported to the FAO, was "endangered". In Japan, approximately 250 of the birds are kept by about a dozen breeders.

== Characteristics ==
The principal characteristic of the Onagadori is its exceptionally long tail, which exceeds 1.5 metres, and has been known to reach 12 m. The tail consists of about 16–18 feathers, which under the right conditions never moult, and grow rapidly, gaining some 0.7–1.3 m per year. The saddle hackles also grow to a considerable length.

In Japan three colour varieties are recognised: black-breasted white, black-breasted red, and white. Genetic study suggests that the black-breasted white was the original type; the other two varieties are genetically distant from it, and may have been created by cross-breeding with birds of other breeds, with little input from the original type.( In the United Kingdom, five colours are recognised by the Poultry Club of Great Britain: black-red, ginger, gold duckwing, silver duckwing, and white; the same five are recognised by the Entente Européenne.

The comb is single, the eyes are a reddish brown, and the ear-lobes are white.

== Use ==
The Onagadori is kept for ornamental purposes only. Japanese breeders through the centuries have gone to great pains in the creation and perpetuation of the breed, and provide special hutches with perches well above the ground, where the tails are kept clean and in good condition.
