= Phoenix chicken =

German breed of long-tailed chicken

Phoenix
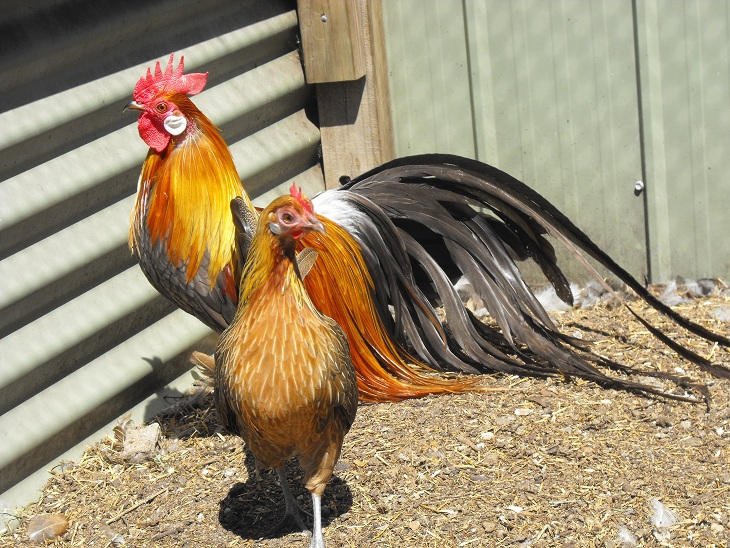
- Blue-breasted golden hen and cock, showing typical long flowing plumage
- Conservation status: FAO (2007): not at risk; DAD-IS (2024): at risk/endangered
- Other names: German: Phönix
- Country of origin: Japan; Germany

Traits
- Weight: Male: Standard: 2.0–2.5 kg; Bantam: 800 g; Female: Standard: 1.5–2.0 kg; Bantam: 700 g
- Skin colour: yellow
- Egg colour: yellowish white
- Comb type: single

Classification
- APA: all other standard breeds
- ABA: single comb clean legged
- EE: yes
- PCGB: not recognised
- APS: light breed softfeather
- Chicken; Gallus gallus domesticus

The Phoenix is a German breed of long-tailed chicken. It derives from cross-breeding of imported long-tailed Japanese birds similar to the Onagadori with other breeds.

== History ==
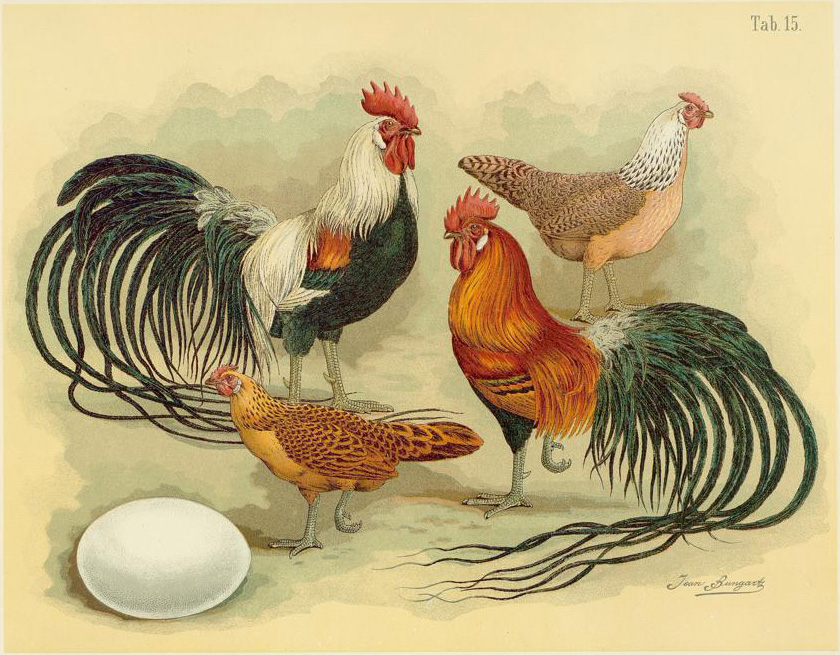
Illustration from the Geflügel-Album of Jean Bungartz, 1885

The Phoenix breed was created by Hugo du Roi, the first president of the national German poultry association, in the late nineteenth century. A few delicate imported long-tailed Japanese birds were cross-bred with birds of other breeds including Combattant de Bruges, Krüper, Leghorn, Malay, Modern Game, Old English Game, Ramelsloher and Yokohama.

The Poultry Club of Great Britain decided in 1904 to group the German Phoenix and Yokohama breeds under the name Yokohama; the Phoenix is not recognised as a breed.

In the twenty-first century it is an endangered breed: its conservation status is listed as "at risk/endangered" for Germany and Australia, with 344 and 387–400 birds respectively, and as "at risk/vulnerable" for the United States, where in 2015 there were 1579 birds.

== Characteristics ==
The Phoenix is recognised in six colours in Germany: gold, silver, orange, black, white and partridge; a further three unrecognised colours are listed by the Entente Européenne. The silver variety was accepted into the Standard of Perfection of the American Poultry Association in 1965; the gold was added in 1983, and the black-breasted red in 2018. The Phoenix was first accepted in the Australian Poultry Standard in 2012, with any colour standardised in Old English Game accepted.

The Onagadori is thought to have a recessive gene that prevents it from moulting each year in the usual way. This gene was not transferred to the Phoenix, so its tail does not reach the same remarkable lengths as that of the original Japanese stock. The tail may reach 90 cm or more.

== Use ==
The Phoenix was bred as an exhibition bird. Standard-sized hens lay about 45 yellowish-white eggs per year, with an average weight of 48 g; bantam hens lay approximately 120 eggs annually, averaging 25 g in weight.

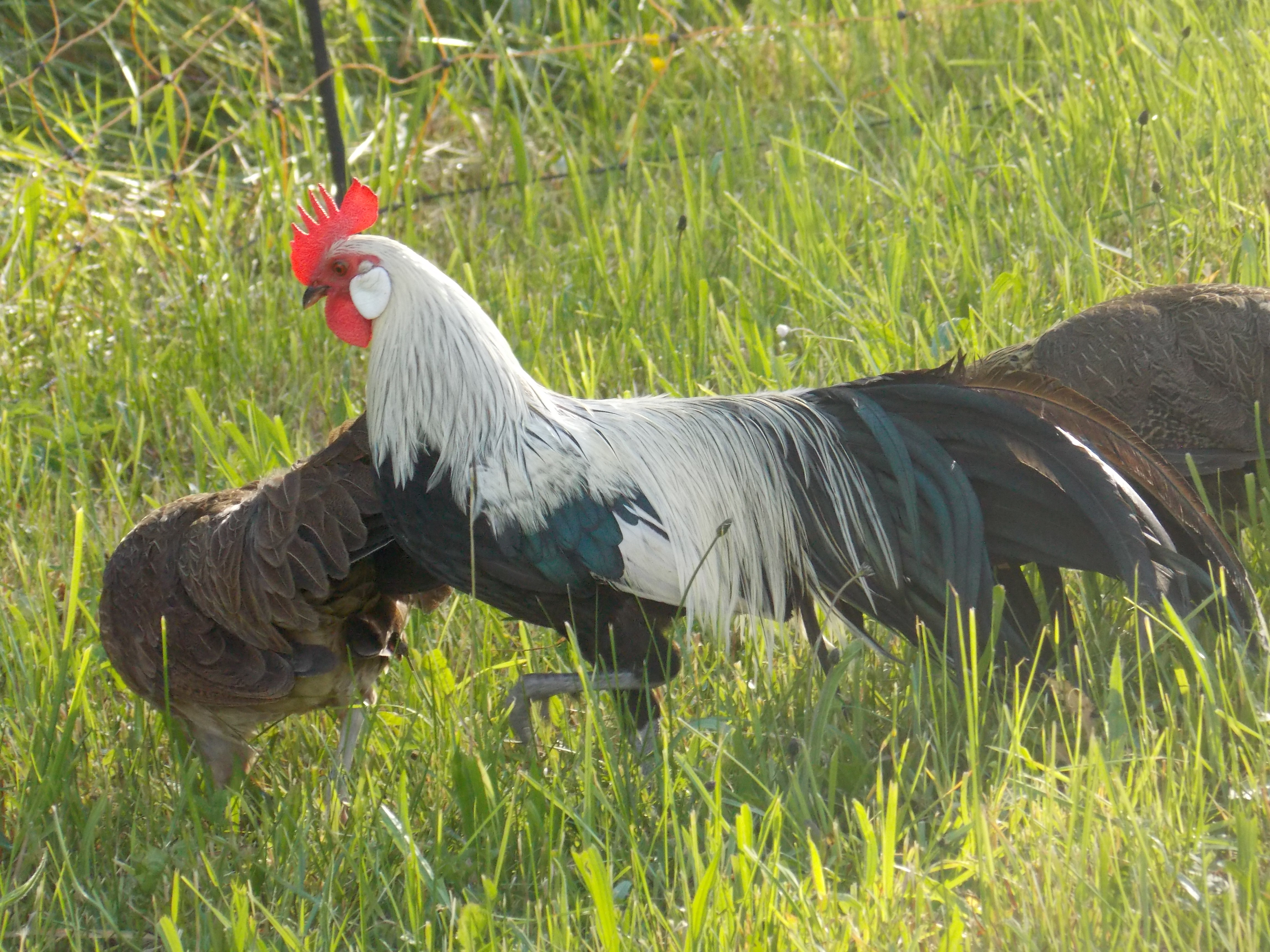
Silver duckwing bantams

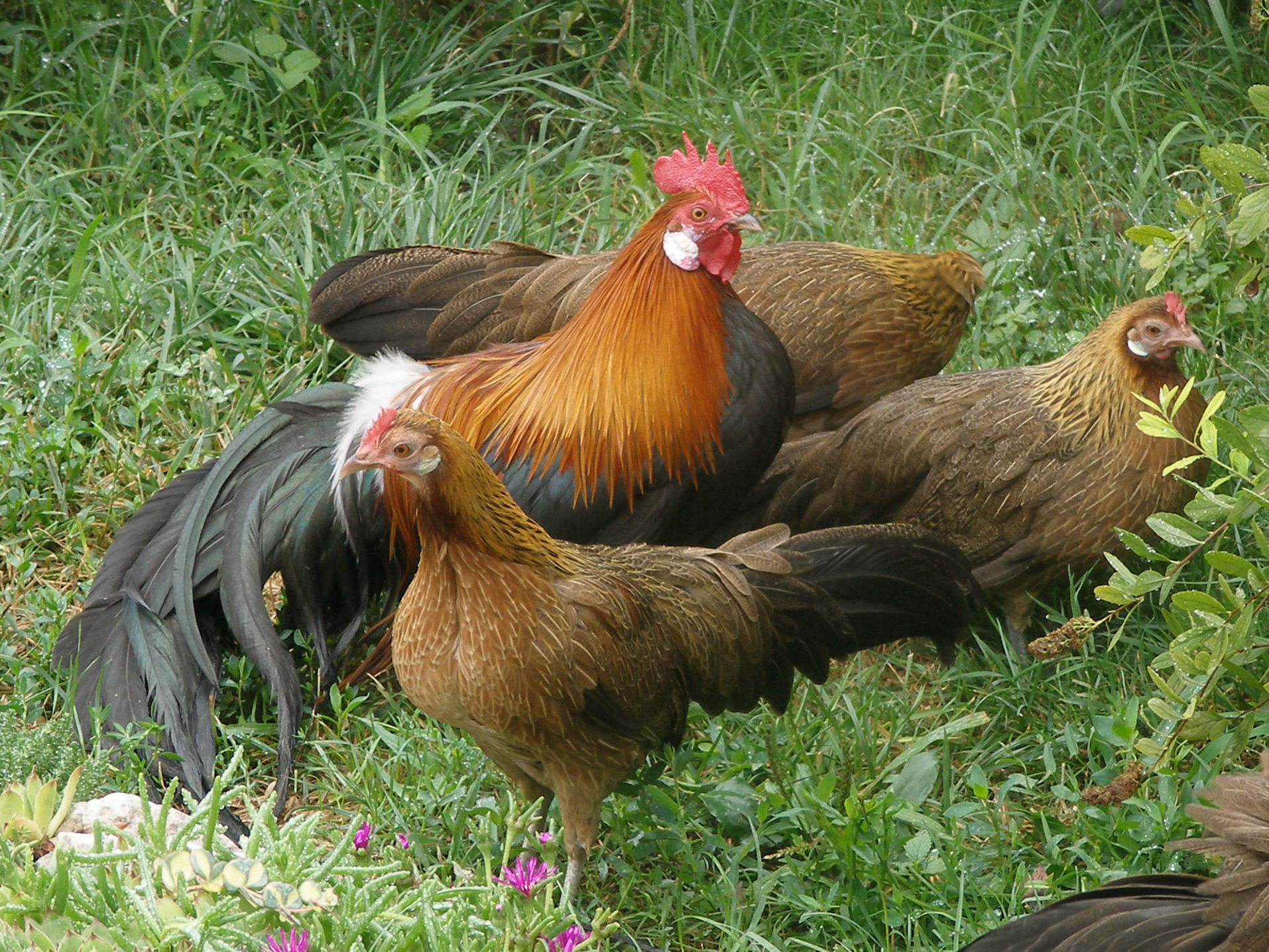
Black-breasted red cock and hens

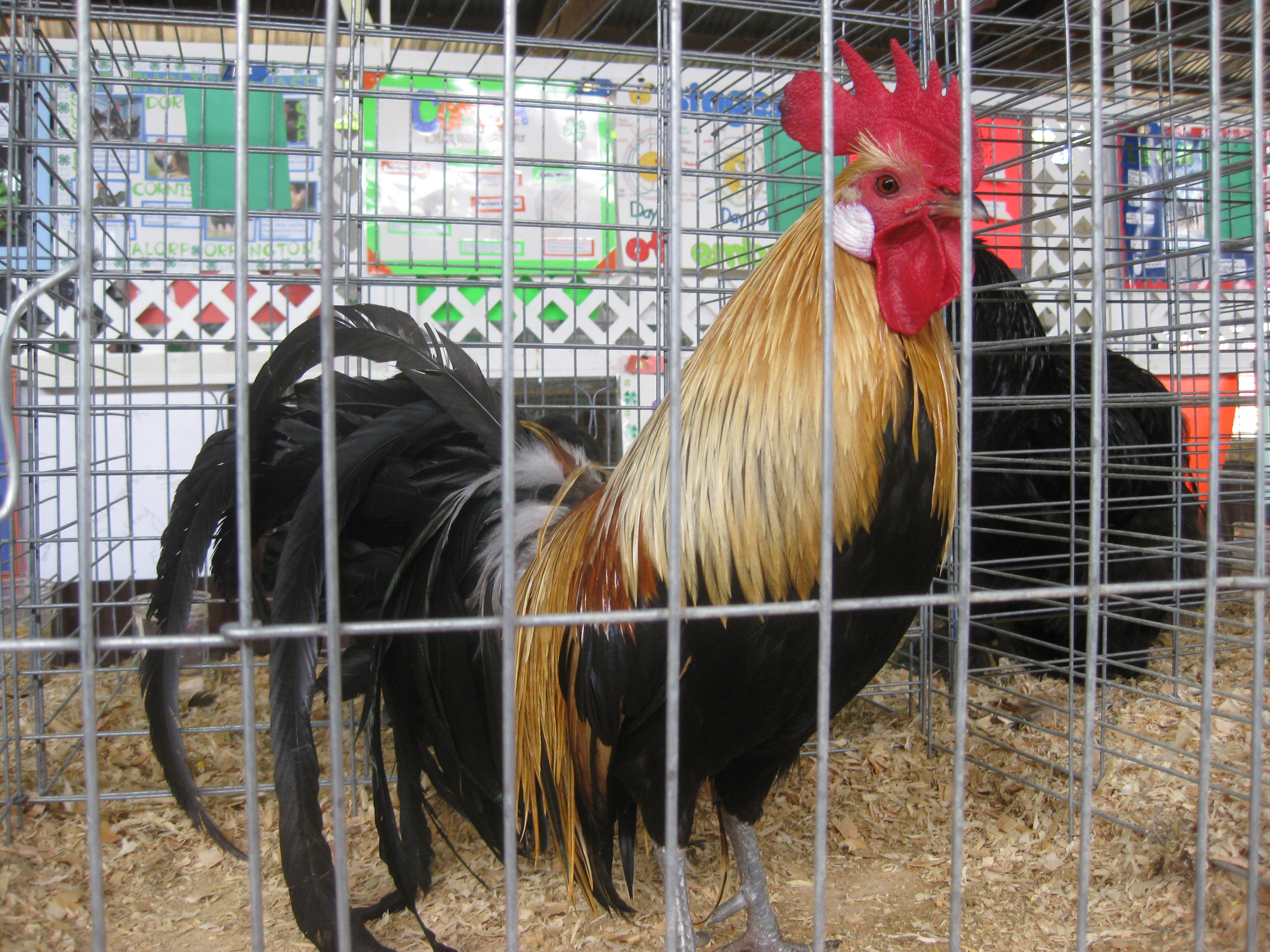
Golden duckwing cock

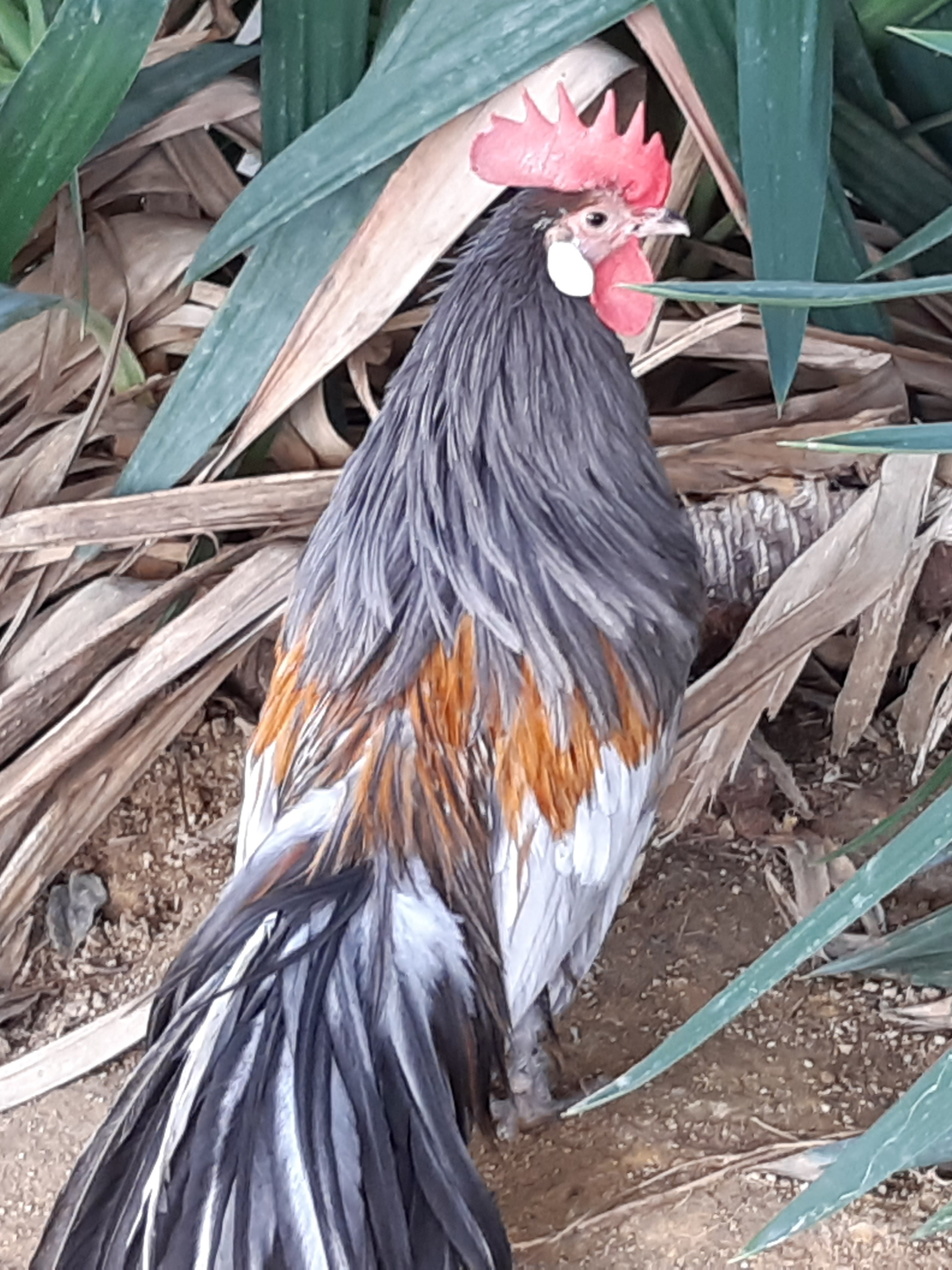
Red-shouldered blue cock
