= Mercy dog =

Military paramedic service dog

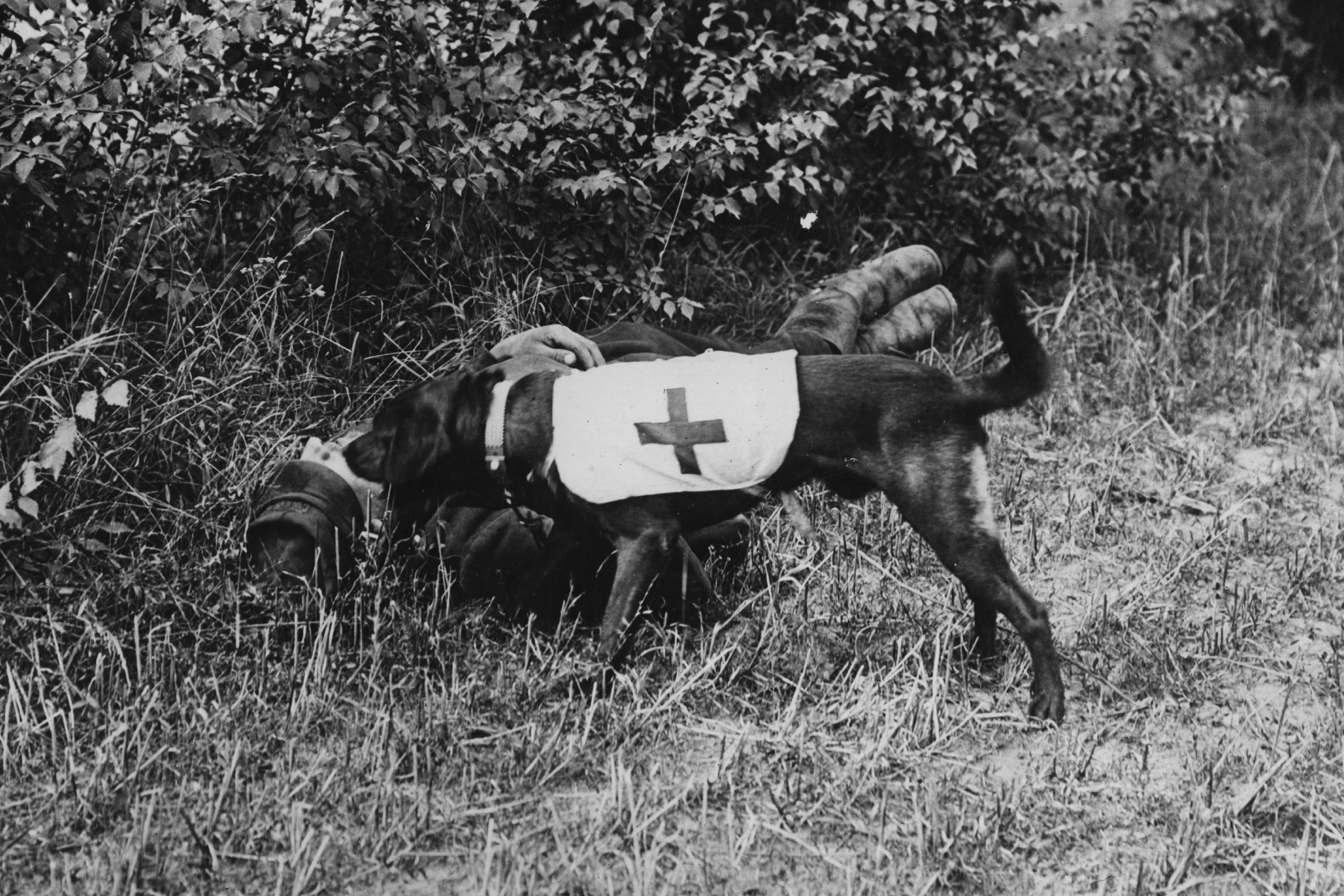
An ambulance dog in World War I

A mercy dog (also known as an ambulance dog, Red Cross dog, or casualty dog) was a dog that served in a paramedical role in the military, most notably during World War I. They were often sent out after large battles, where they would seek out wounded soldiers, and they were well-suited to the conditions of trench warfare. They carried first-aid supplies that could then be used by wounded soldiers, and comforted dying soldiers who were mortally wounded. They were also trained to guide combat medics to soldiers who required extensive care. Many mercy dogs were trained by national Red Cross societies to serve the country in which the specific society operated. The German army called such dogs medical dogs. As many as 20,000 dogs are estimated to have served as mercy dogs in World War I and World War II, and they have been credited with saving thousands of lives. Such dogs were also used by the United States in the Korean War.

== Description ==
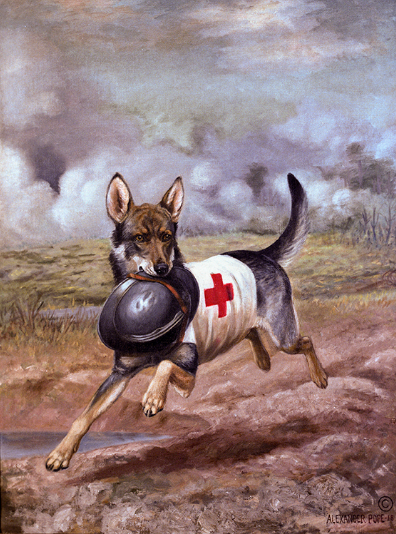
Painting by Alexander Pope of a red cross dog carrying a soldier's helmet

A typical mercy dog in World War I was outfitted with a saddlebag that had water, liquor, and first aid supplies. They were trained by the Red Cross society that was based in the country of each army to travel silently around no man's land, typically at night or after a battle had ended, looking for its side's wounded soldiers and ignoring dead or wounded enemy ones. When they found a soldier, the soldier could use the medical supplies to tend to their wounds. If their condition was severe enough that this was impossible, the dog would return to the trenches with a piece of the soldier's uniform and lead a paramedic to the soldier. If the dog was unsuccessful in finding a wounded soldier, it would lie down in front of its handler instead of leading the handler to them. Some dogs were fitted with gas masks.

Dogs attached to Allied Powers were trained to take a piece of uniform and those with the Central Powers any item, including a helmet or particularly a belt. Some dogs were also involved in pulling soldiers on carts between the front lines and medical bases further back. Mercy dogs were known to drag soldiers to safety at times. The dogs would also comfort mortally wounded soldiers as they died.

A military surgeon praised the dog's abilities to triage wounded soldiers, saying "They sometimes lead us to the bodies we think have no life in them, but when we bring them back to the doctors [. . .] they always find a spark. It is purely a matter of their instinct, [which] is far more effective than man's reasoning powers."

== History ==
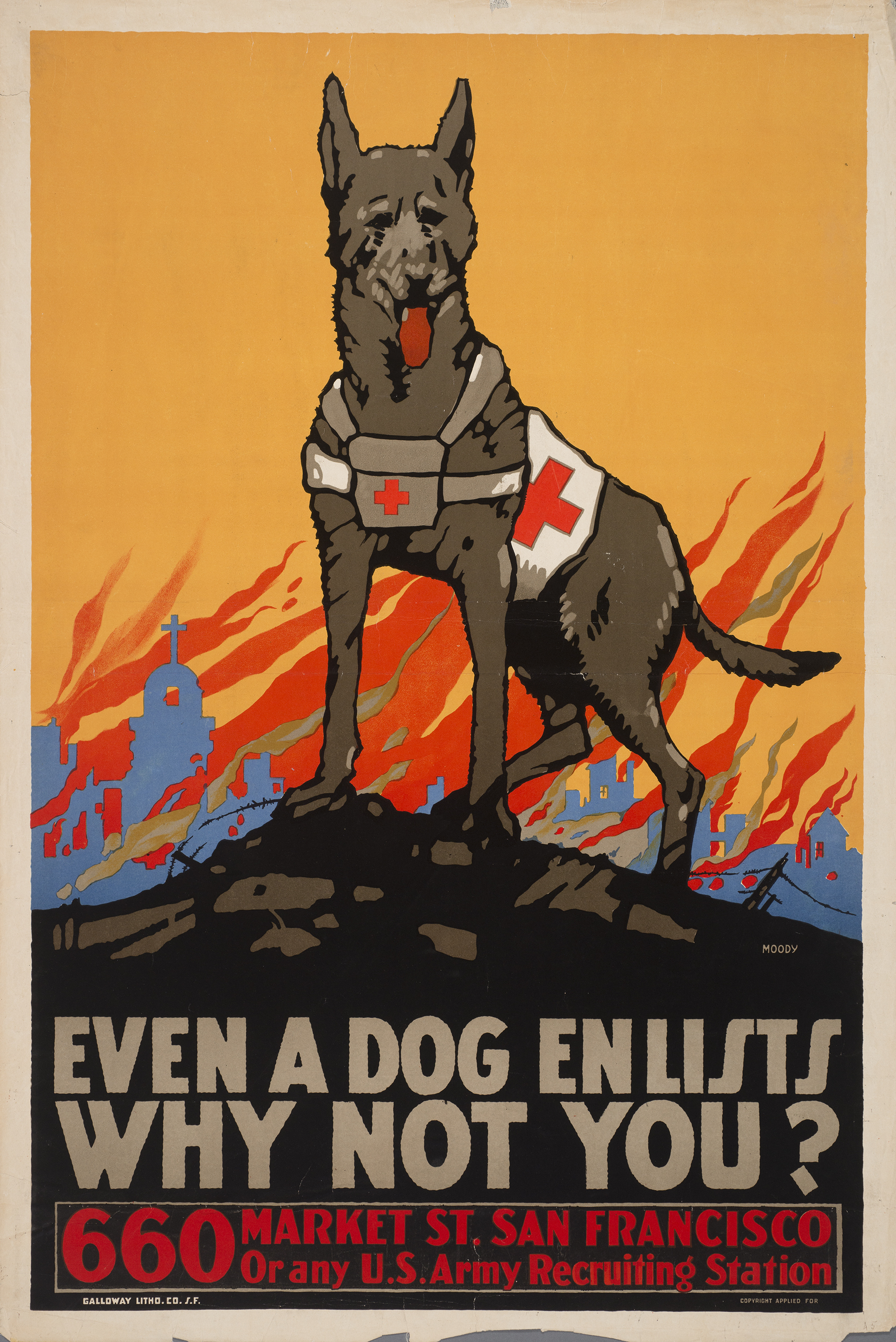
A military recruitment poster

The first mercy dogs were trained by the German army in the late 19th century. A program to train mercy dogs in 1895 begun by Jean Bungartz in Germany was described as a "novel experiment". By 1908, Italy, Austria, France and Germany had programs training mercy dogs.

=== World War I ===
By the beginning of World War I, Germany had around 6,000 trained dogs, many of which were ambulance dogs. The German army called them 'Sanitätshunde', or 'medical dogs'. The nation is estimated to have used a total of 30,000 dogs during the war, mainly as messengers and ambulance dogs. Of those, 7,000 were killed. It is estimated that upwards of 50,000 dogs were used by all the combatants.

Upon the outbreak of fighting, Britain did not have a program for training military dogs. Edwin Hautenville Richardson, an officer in the British Army who had experience working with military dogs and had advocated for the start of a military program since 1910, trained several dogs as ambulance dogs and offered them to the British Army. After the army did not accept, he gave them to the British Red Cross. As a result of his advocacy, Britain created a British War Dog School with Richardson as the commander. The school eventually trained more than 200 dogs.

As many as 10,000 dogs are estimated to have served as mercy dogs in World War I, and are credited with saving thousands of lives, including at least 2,000 in France and 4,000 wounded German soldiers. Several such dogs drew specific attention for their work, including Captain for finding 30 soldiers in one day, and Prusco for finding 100 men in just one battle. Both were French dogs. Prusco was known to drag soldiers into ditches as a safe harbor while he went to summon rescuers. However, many French dogs were killed in the line of action, and the program was discontinued.

While many European nations had a mercy dog program during World War I, the United States did not, as its leadership felt the war would end soon enough that such a program was unnecessary. Numerous US dogs did serve in the Red Cross, whose dogs bore the red-cross emblem on their saddlebags. Americans borrowed dogs from their allies, as they had no organized dog units.

Mercy dogs were considered symbolic of patriotism, Jill Lenk Schilp writes that they were "elevated to heroic levels and attributed human emotions and characteristics Some dogs may have had traumatic stress as a result of their service. The American dog Sergeant Stubby, who located wounded service personnel among other activities, was not honoured with a Dickin Medal (the animal equivalent of a Victoria Cross), as many animals were. Rather, he was made a "Sergeant."

=== World War II and later programs ===
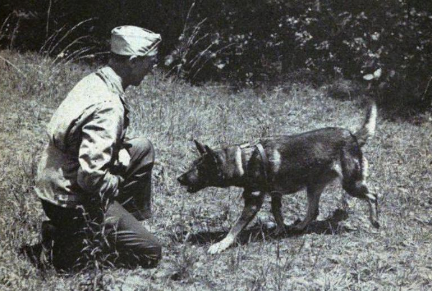
A casualty dog reporting to its handler during US Army training exercises.

In the lead-up to World War II, it was reported that the German Army was conscripting dogs to serve as messengers, watch dogs, and mercy dogs. During that war, the United States Army Medical Corps used ambulances with six casualty dogs, mainly Pointers and setters, to find wounded soldiers. Its training program began in August 1942.

The United States Army utilized a casualty dog program during the Korean War to find wounded soldiers. German Shepherds were used for the work, which consisted of searching for a soldier and bringing their handler to them. The dogs were trained at Fort Riley, Kansas.

After World War II ended, the American Red Cross began a therapy dog program, which continued until at least 2019.

== In popular culture ==
A historical fiction book, Darling, Mercy Dog by Alison Hart, was published in 2013.

The 2014 video game Valiant Hearts: The Great War features a German medical dog named Walt, who takes on a prominent story and gameplay role.

== See also ==
- Dogs in warfare
- Search and rescue dog
- Medical response dog
