= Yokohama chicken =

Breed of chicken

Yokohama
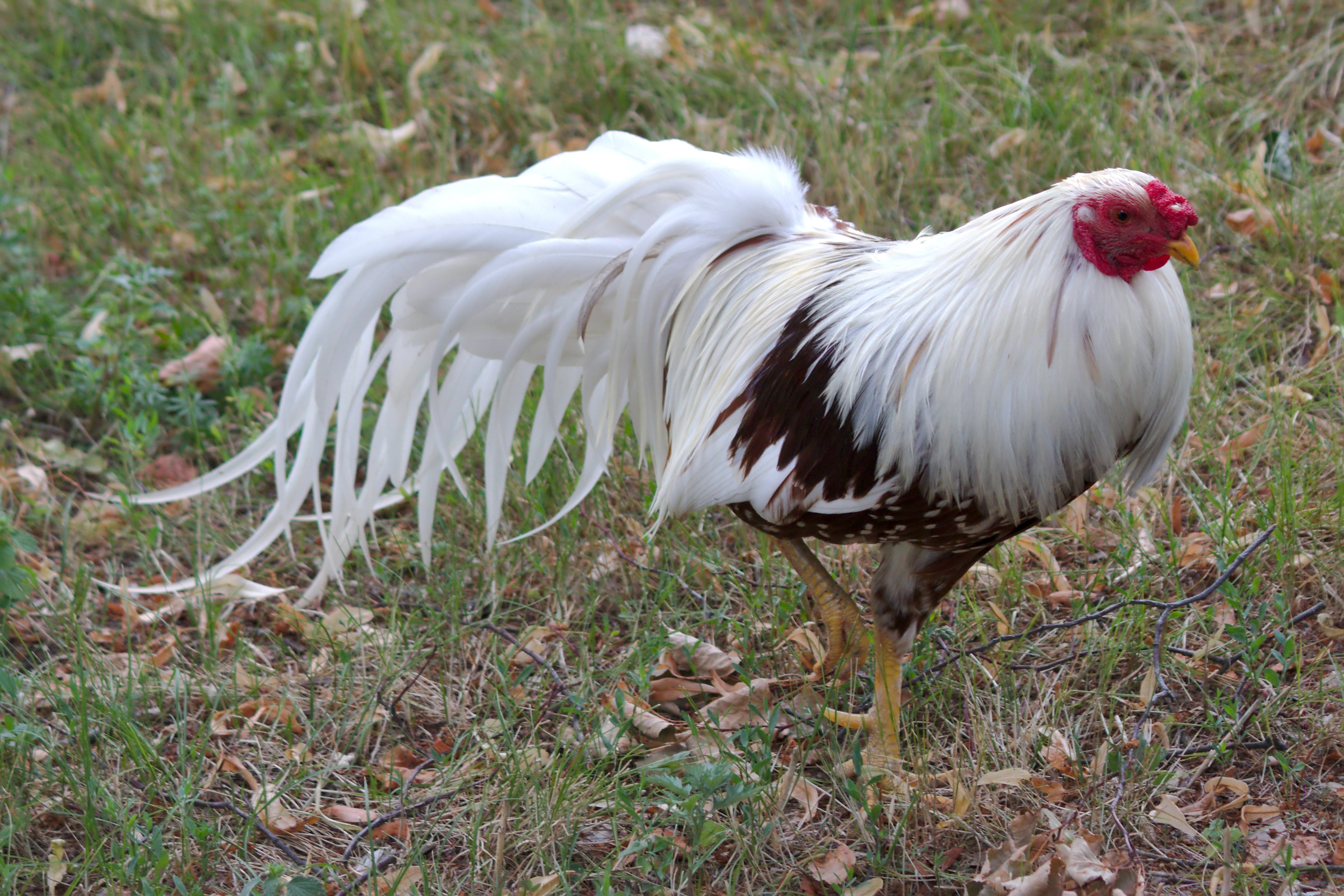
- A red-saddled cock

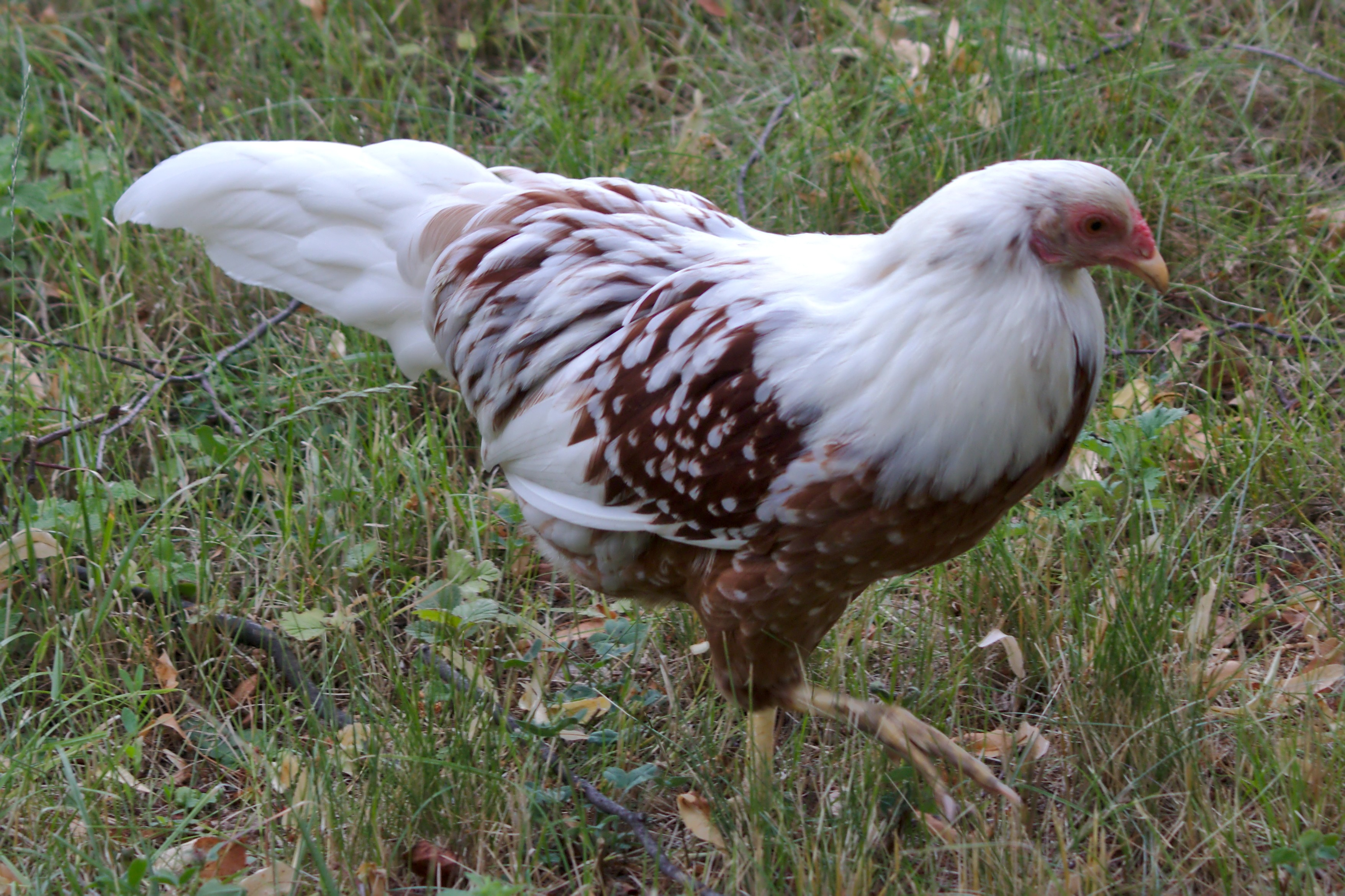
- A red-saddled hen
- Country of origin: Germany
- Standard: Sonderverein (in German)
- Use: ornamental

Traits
- Weight: Male: Standard: 2.0–2.5 kg Bantam: 900 g; Female: Standard: 1.3–1.8 kg Bantam: 700 g
- Egg colour: tinted
- Comb type: walnut or pea

Classification
- APA: all other standard breeds
- ABA: all other comb, clean legged
- EE: yes
- PCGB: rare soft feather: light
- Chicken; Gallus gallus domesticus

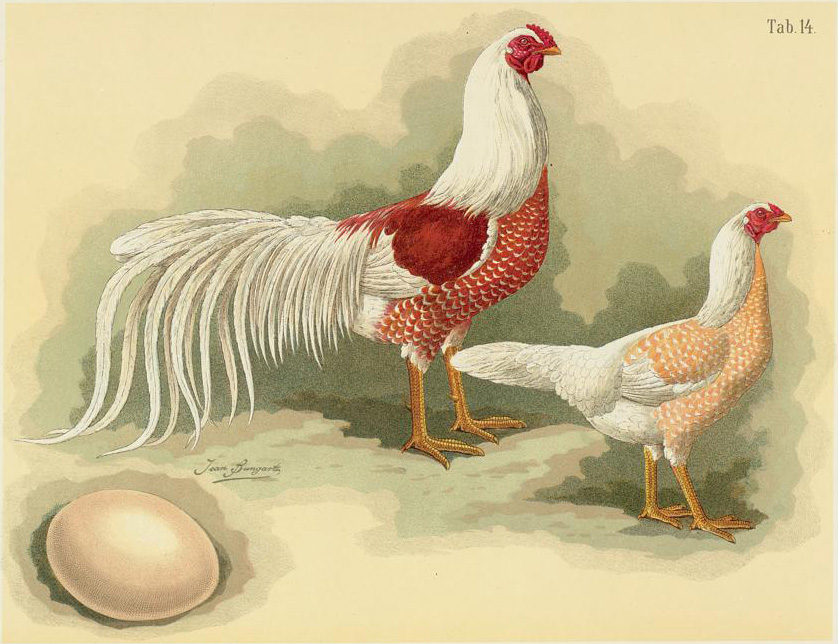
Red-saddled cock and hen, illustration from the Geflügel-Album of Jean Bungartz, 1885

The Yokohama is a German breed of fancy chicken, with unusual colouring and very long tail-feathers. It was created by Hugo du Roi in the 1880s, and derives from ornamental birds brought to Europe from Japan in the second half of the nineteenth century. Some of these were shipped from the Japanese port of Yokohama, and so were known by that name. In Germany, the Yokohama name is used only for white or red-saddled birds; in the United Kingdom, it is used also for the birds known elsewhere as Phoenix, in various colours.

== History ==
From 1639 to 1854 – almost all of the Edo period – Japan was effectively closed to foreign trade. Under the Convention of Kanagawa of 1854, five ports were to be constructed for trade with the rest of the world. One of these was Yokohama, which opened in 1859. Among the goods exported to Europe were unusual traditional Japanese long-tailed chickens; the first documented export was in 1864. In that year, some of the birds reached the Jardin Zoologique d'Acclimatation in Paris, where they were named Yokohama for their port of origin. Within a few years some had been taken to Germany, where Hugo du Roi, the first president of the Bund Deutscher Rassegeflügelzüchter, the German national poultry association, began to breed them. It is not known whether he created the red-saddled colouring by cross-breeding, or if birds with that colouring had been brought from Japan; it is no longer found there. The Yokohama was among the breeds illustrated by Jean Bungartz in his Geflügel-Album of 1885.

Some birds were exported to the United Kingdom, where a breeders' club was formed in about 1904. There the Yokohama name was used both for du Roi's Yokohama birds and for another, quite distinct, breed he had developed, the Phoenix, which has a single comb and a different range of colours.

The bantam Yokohama was bred in Germany in the usual way, by cross-breeding standard-sized birds with suitably-coloured bantams of other breeds.

== Characteristics ==
The Yokohama is a small chicken with an unusually long tail, and long trailing saddle feathers. It has a pea- or walnut-comb. The beak, legs and feet are yellow.

In Germany two colours are recognised, white and red-saddled. In the United Kingdom, where the name Yokohama is used also for the birds known in Germany as Phoenix, there are several more colours in addition to red-saddled and white; these include black-tailed buff, blue-red, spangled, black-red, golden duckwing and silver duckwing. In the United States, the red-saddled (red-shouldered) and white varieties were added to the Standard of Perfection in 1981.

== Use ==
The Yokohama is kept mainly for showing. Full-sized hens lay about 80 eggs per year; they are tinted and weigh about 40 g. Bantam hens lay about 90 eggs averaging 30 g in weight.
