= Edwin Hautenville Richardson =

British Army officer,kynologist and specialist in service dogs training

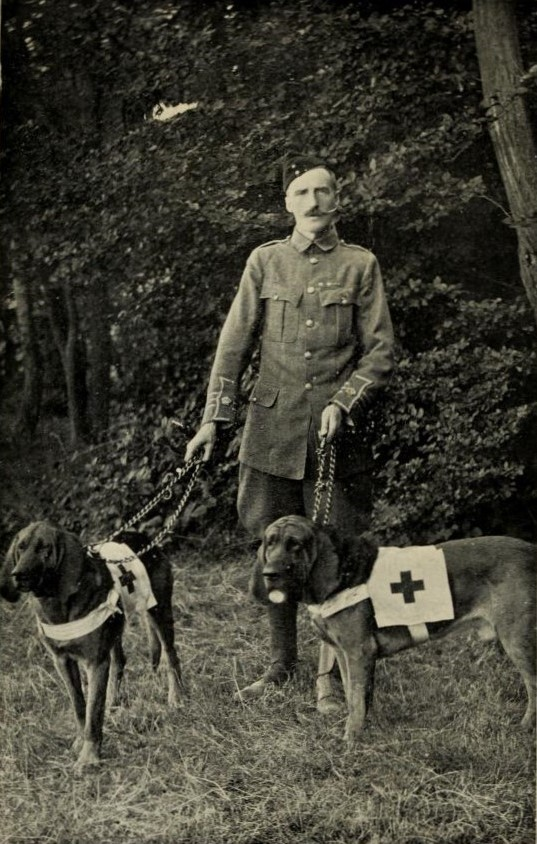
- Major Richardson and two ambulance dogs (c. 1910)
- Born: 24 August 1863; Lisburn, County Antrim, Ireland
- Died: 4 April 1948 (aged 84); Woking, Surrey, England
- Spouse: Blanche Bannon
- Military career
- Allegiance: United Kingdom
- Branch: British Army
- Service years: c. 1880 – c. 1940s
- Rank: Lieutenant colonel
- Units: Sherwood Foresters; Royal Engineers
- Conflicts: World War I
- Awards: Fellow of the Zoological Society of London

Lieutenant colonel Edwin Hautenville Richardson (24 August 1863 – 4 April or 4 August 1948) was a British Army officer, kynologist and specialist in training of service dogs for police or military messenger or ambulance duties. Around 1908 he trained the first official police service dogs in the United Kingdom and in 1910s he became a co-founder of service dogs training programme of the British Army, large number of whom later served in World War I and World War II.

== Early life ==
Richardson was born in Lisburn, County Antrim, Ireland (present-day Northern Ireland), got educated at Cheltenham College, Cheltenham and then studied at Royal Military Academy Sandhurst. At first joining the 45th Infantry Regiment (Sherwood Foresters) he entered West York Militia in 1882 having a rank of captain in 1895. At the same year he started to intensively study possible usage of dogs for military and police purposes following the news about German military officers buying British shepard collies to be trained as a military dogs.

In 1894 Richardson married his spouse Blanche Bannon, who shared with him an enthusiasm for dog keeping and training.

== Dog training ==
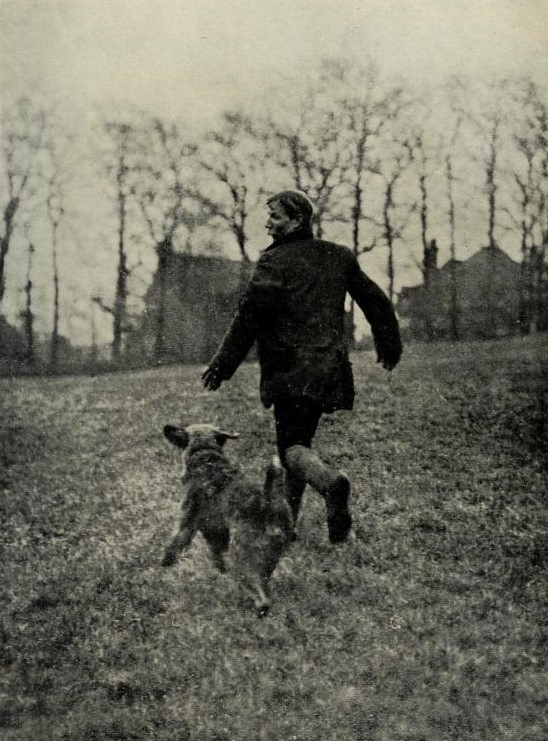
One of Major Richardson's police dogs: training the young dog to pursue (c. 1910)

In the early 1900s Mr and Mrs Richardson moved to Carnoustie, on the east coast of Scotland and in their new home they built a dog training station. Richardsons started to cooperate with the officers of nearby Barry Buddon army camp, so the dogs could train their tasks with the real soldiers around, and also used to hire unemployed locals for pretending to be injured or dead during his training tests. Nevertheless, British Army command showed a very little interest about military service dogs and rejected the idea of dog units, Richardson assigned the dogs to the British Red Cross.

At the beginning of the Russo-Japanese War in 1904, the Russian embassy in London contacted Lt. Colonel Richardson for help acquiring dogs for the Russian Army, trained to take the wounded away from the battlefields. Richardson responded by sending a couple of trained terriers, who should fill those tasks, but the dogs were never put into service and reintroduced in the Soviet Red Army in the 1920s.

In 1906, Richardson tried to interest the British Police in using dogs to accompany officers, for protection on patrol at night. Mr. Geddes, Chief Goods Manager for Hull Docks, Yorkshire, was convinced after he went and saw the impressive work of police dogs in Belgium. Geddes convinced Superintendent Dobie of the North Eastern Railway Police, to arrange a plan for policing the docks. The first four dogs, the Airedale terriers, began patrols in the docks area in 1908, and the scheme was later extended to other docks policed by the North Eastern Railway Police.

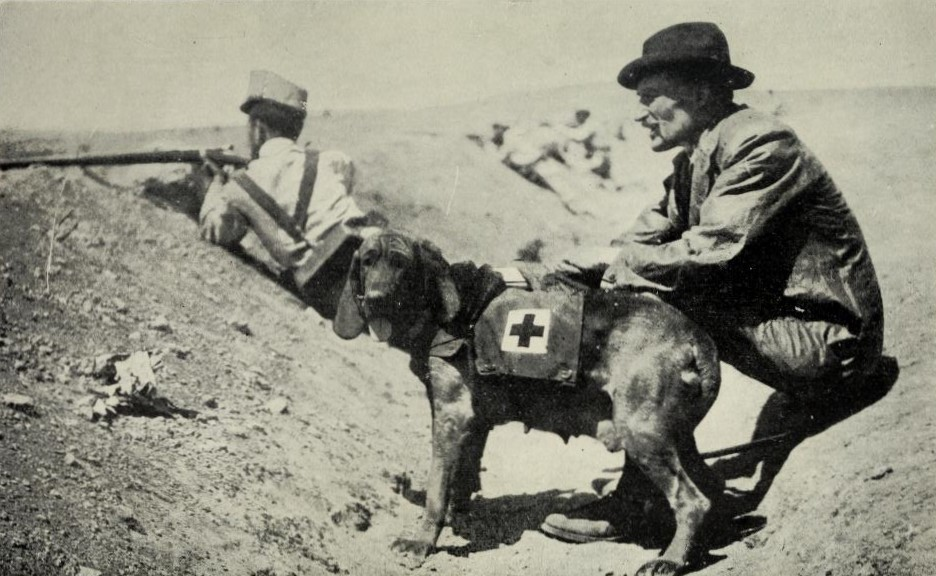
Major Richardson and his ambulance Bloodhound in the trenches at Melilla in the Second Melillan campaign of 1909

In 1909 Richardson personally followed his service dogs imported for the Spanish Army in the warfare of Moroccan War in 1909. In 1911 he was employed as Trainer of War and Police Dogs in Harrow on the Hill, Middlesex. Trained animals from this school were later supplied as the sentry dogs to the Abor Expedition in Northern India in 1911, Naga Hill Expedition in 1913 or service dogs for Gibraltar Fortress. Richardson was present with his dogs serving in the Italian Field Force in Tripoli during the Italo-Turkish War and probably also in the Second Balkan War in 1912–1913. Around 1911 he is stated as a member of Royal Engineers Corps.

== British War Dog School ==
Despite the army headquarters rejections, Richardson was asked by the individual troops for service dogs constantly. At the outbreak of World War I he started to supply British Expeditionary Troops in Europe, serving with the British primarily in Belgium or also during the Dardanelles Campaign. In 1916 two Airedale dogs, Wolf and Prince, trained as a message carriers by artillery corps, showed their extraordinary reliability and skills so the officers started to use them for more various tasks. As a result of Richardson's continuous advocacy, the British War Dog School at request of War Office was officially created in 1917 with Richardson as the commander and Mrs Richardson as a ranked soldier. The school located at Shoeburyness Artillery School in Essex eventually trained more than 200 dogs.

== Later years ==
Richardson remained active in dog training activities and work until early 1940s, publishing multiple works sharing his lifelong experience of the profession. He died on 4 April 1948 in Woking, Surrey at age of 84.

== Works ==
- War, Police, and Watch Dogs (1910)
- British War Dogs (1920)
- Forty Years with Dogs (1920)

== See also ==
- Dogs in warfare
- Mercy dog
- Medical response dog

== Biography ==
- Schilp, Jill Lenk (24 September 2019). "The Mercy Dogs of World War I". Dogs in Health Care: Pioneering Animal-Human Partnerships. Jefferson, North Carolina USA: McFarland & Company. pp. 13–24. ISBN 978-1-4766-7394-3.
- Strathie, Anne (2015). From Ice Floes to Battlefields: Scott's 'Antarctics' in the First World War. The History Press. ISBN 978-0-7509-6178-3.
