= List of poultry feathers =

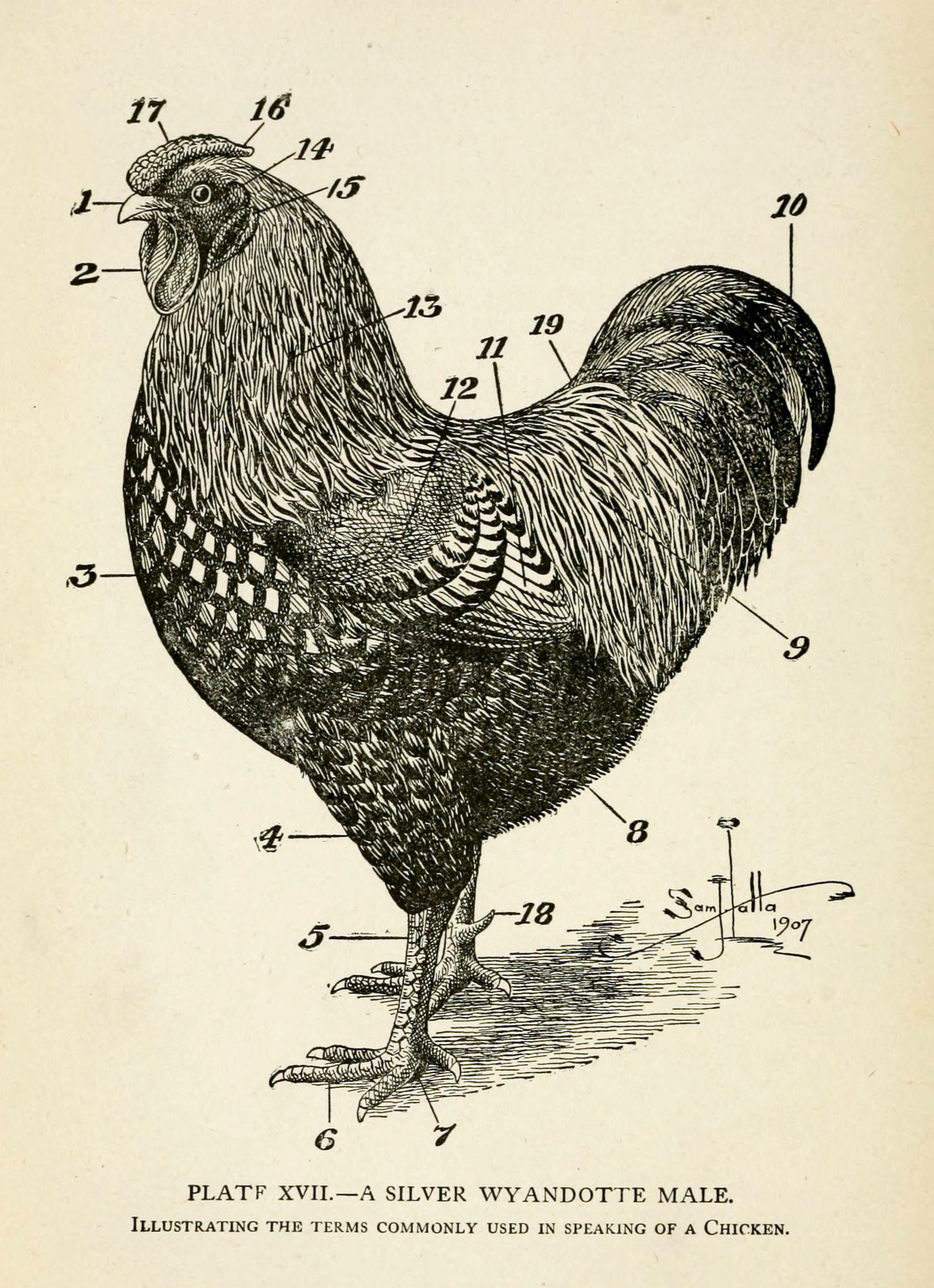
Feathers shown on this image from 1907 are: 8. Fluff; 9. Saddle feathers; 10. Sickles; 11. Primaries; 12. Scapulars; 19. Tail coverts

Some terms used for the feathers of poultry are identical to those used for feathers of other birds, while others are specific to poultry. They include:

Feather	Description	Notes	Image
Beard	Feathers projecting below the beak	only in bearded breeds	
Crest	Feathers projecting upwards from the head	only in crested breeds	
Ear tufts	Feathers projecting from the ear	primarily found in the Araucana breed	
Flight coverts	Short feathers covering the base of the primaries and secondaries		
Fluff	The soft feathers on the underside of the bird		
Lesser sickles	Long curved feathers of the tail, below the sickles	only in cock birds	
Main tail feathers	The long straight feathers forming the tail, under the tail coverts		
Muff	Feathers projecting below and around the eyes	only in bearded breeds	
Neck hackles	The long feathers of the neck	Neck hackles on pictured individual are mottled black and cream.	
Primary flights or primaries	The longest and outermost feathers of the wing		
Saddle feathers	Feathers covering the back or saddle before the tail coverts; in cocks they are long and pointed	divided into upper and lower saddles	
Scapulars	Short feathers on the upper side of the wing near the body		
Secondaries	The long flight feathers of the inner part of the wing		
Sickles	The two longest curved feathers of the tail	only in cock birds	
Tail coverts	Short feathers covering the base of the main tail feathers in cocks, and most of the tail in hens		
Vulture hocks	Stiff feathers projecting downwards behind the leg	only in some breeds. Cochin breed, pictured, has visible white vulture hocks.	
Wing bar	Short feathers covering the base of the secondaries and of the flight coverts		
Wing bow coverts	Short feathers covering the upper part of the wing between the scapulars and the wing bar		
