= Jean Bungartz =

German animal painter, author, illustrator

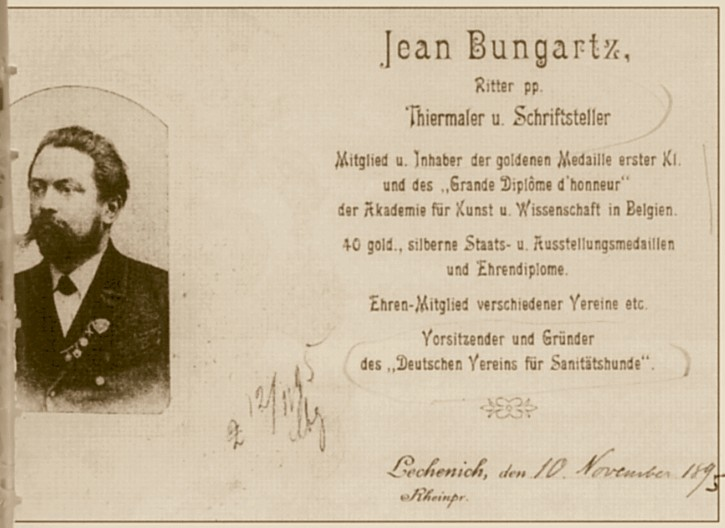
- Born: 6 May 1854; Cologne, Kingdom of Prussia
- Died: 15 September 1934 (aged 80); Münster, Germany
- Occupations: animal painter, author, book illustrator

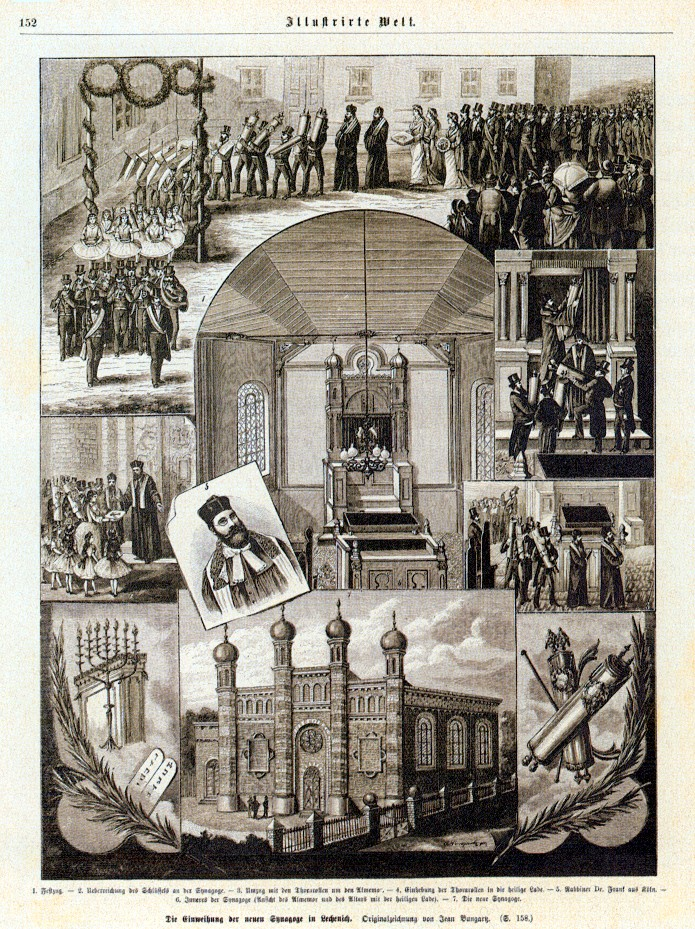
Inauguration of the synagogue in Lechenich, 1886

Jean Bungartz (6 May 1854 – 15 September 1934) was a German animal painter, author and book illustrator.

Bungartz founded the Hamburger Verein zur Förderung reiner Hunderassen, the Hamburg society for the promotion of pure-bred dogs, in the 1880s. In 1893 he founded the Deutschen Verein für Sanitätshunde, the German association for Red Cross dogs, and led it until 1909.

== Publications ==
His published works include:

- Kynos: Handbuch zur Beurtheilung der Racen-Reinheit des Hundes: fünfunddressig Tafeln mit 70 Abbildungen. Stuttgart: Neff, 1884.
- Hühnerracen, illustriertes Handbuch zur Beurtheilung der Racen des Haushuhnes. Leipzig: E. Twietmeyer, 1885.
- Geflügel-Album (Abth. 1, Hühner). Lechenich: Ferd. Bungartz, 1885.
- Pflege und Zucht der Zwergpapageien und Sittiche. Lechenich: Ferd. Bungartz, 1885.
- Taubenracen: illustrietes handbuch zur Beurtheilung der Racen unserer Haustauben; enthaltend die bis jetzt bekannten Farben-, Racen- und verschiedenen ausländischen Luxustauben. Leipzig: Twietmeyer, 1885.
- Wasser- und Ziergeflügel: ill. Handbuch zur Beurtheilung d. Raren u. Schläge unseres Wasser- u. Ziergeflügels; nebst kurzen Angaben über Haltung, Pflege, Fütterung u. Aufzucht; Anl. zur Errichtung e. kleinen Ententeiches u. e. Fasanenvolière. Leipzig: Twietmeyer, 1886.
- Die jagdbaren Thiere Europas und die zur Jagd gebräuchlichen Hunderacen. Stuttgart: P. Neff, 1886.
- Deutscher Hundesport: vollständige Anleitung über Baulichkeiten, Einrichtungen etc; nebst den zum Rennen geeignesten Hunderacen. Minden: E. Schlegel, 1886.
- Modell-Brieftauben-Album: Aquarellen gemalt v. Jean Bungartz. Mit e. Vorw. v. J. Hörter. 10 Taf. in Farbendruck. Leipzig: Twietmeyer, 1888.
- Kaninchen-Racen. Illustrirtes Handbuch zur Beurtheilung der Kaninchen-Racen, enthaltend die Racen der Kaninchen, deren Behandlung, Zucht, Verwerthung, Krankheiten. Magdeburg: Creutz'sche Verlagsbuchhandlung, [1888].
- Der Kriegshund und seine Dressur: enthaltend das Ganze des Kriegshundwesens. Leipzig: Twietmeyer, 1892.
- Der Hund im Dienste des rothen Kreuzes: seine Verwendung, Rasse, Dressur, Pflege und Fütterung. Leipzig: Twietmeyer, 1892.
- Illustriertes Katzenbuch. Berlin: Paul Parey, 1896.
- Die Ziege, Ihre Haltung, Pflege, Fütterung, Zucht usw.. Berlin: August Scherl, 1918.
- Das Schaf, seine Rassen, Zucht, Haltung, Fütterung usw.. Berlin: August Scherl, 1920.
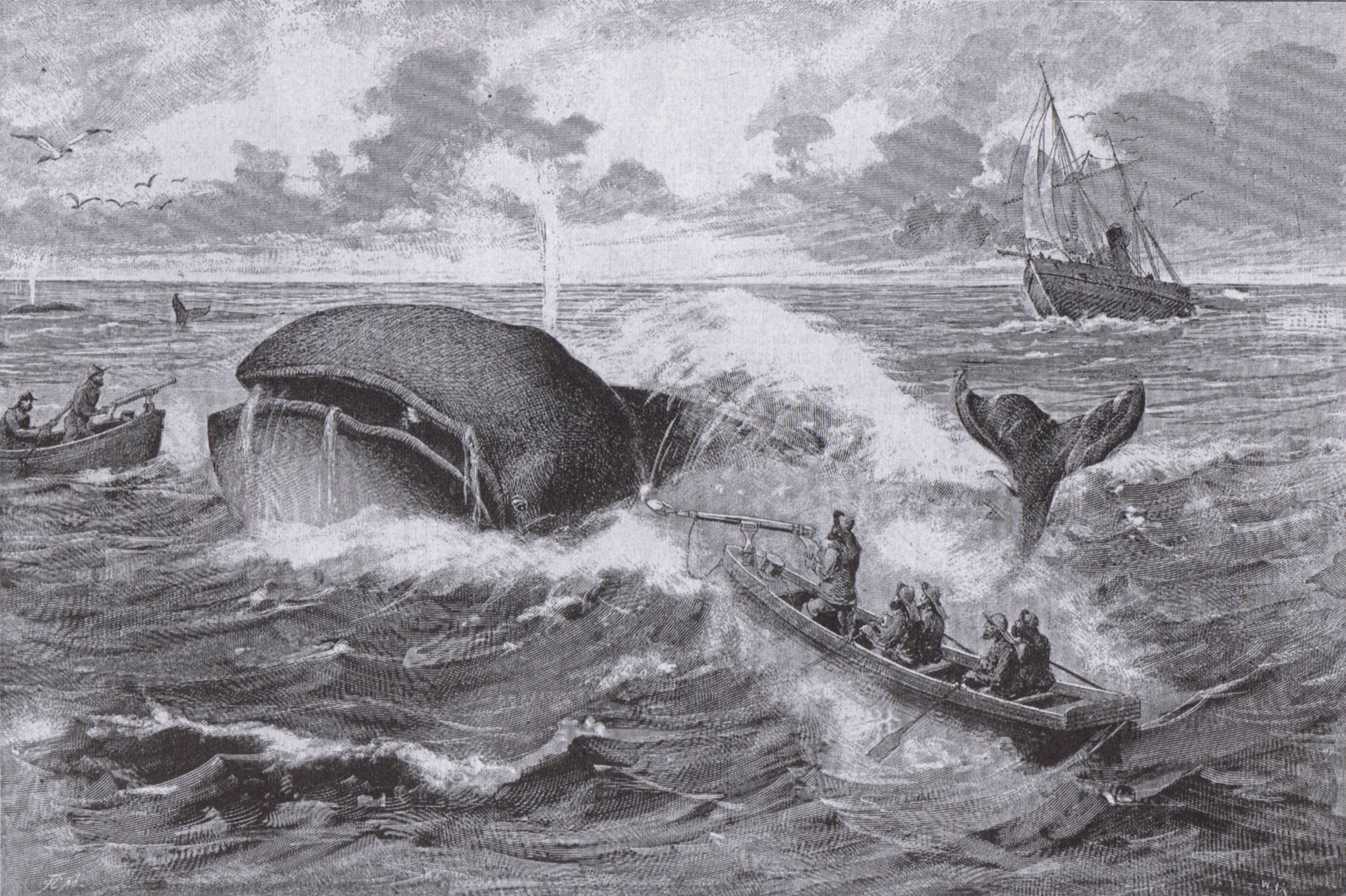
Whaling in the new way, wood engraving, 1885

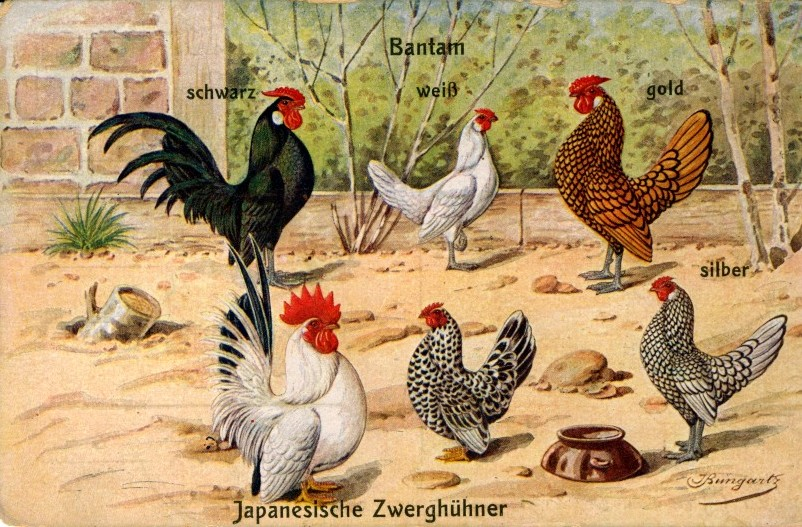
Bantams, coloured postcard, 1910
