= Alsace (goose breed) =

French breed of goose

Alsatian
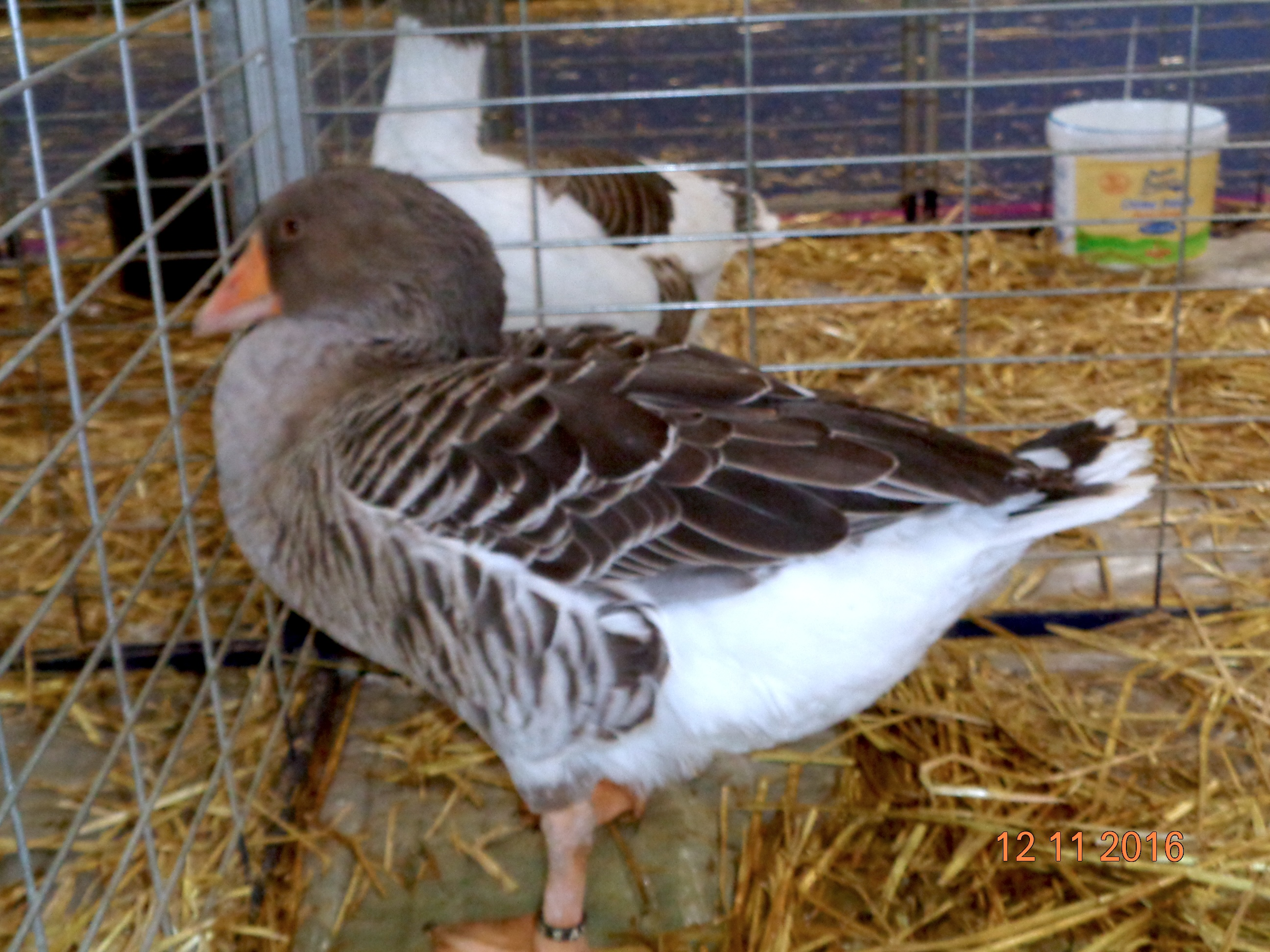
- The grey

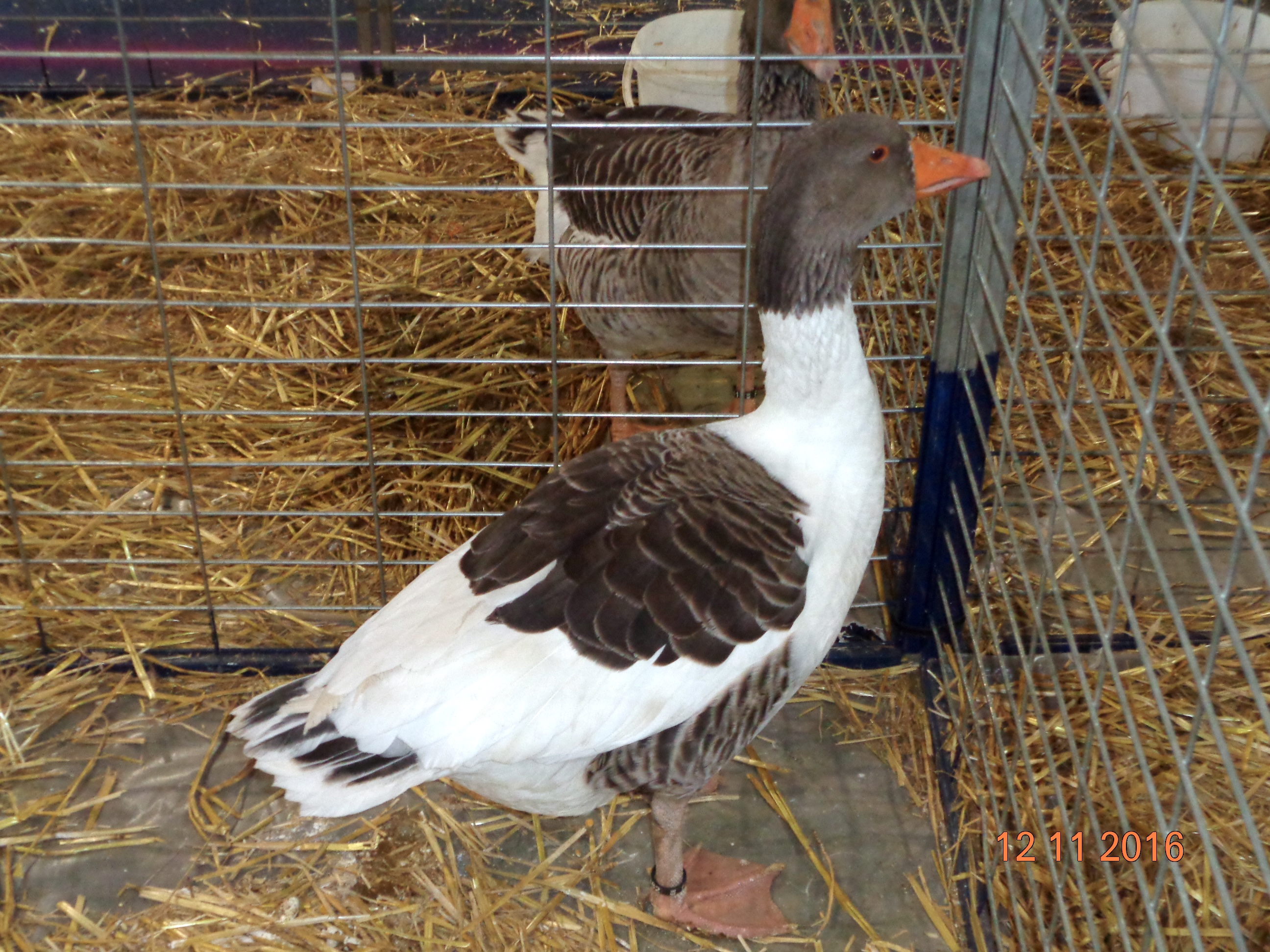
- The pied
- Conservation status: FAO (2007): no data; DAD-IS (2025): unknown
- Other names: Elsässer; French: Oie d'Alsace; German: Elsässer Gans
- Country of origin: German Empire, France
- Distribution: Alsace

Classification
- APA: not recognised
- EE: yes
- PCGB: not recognised
- Goose; Anser anser

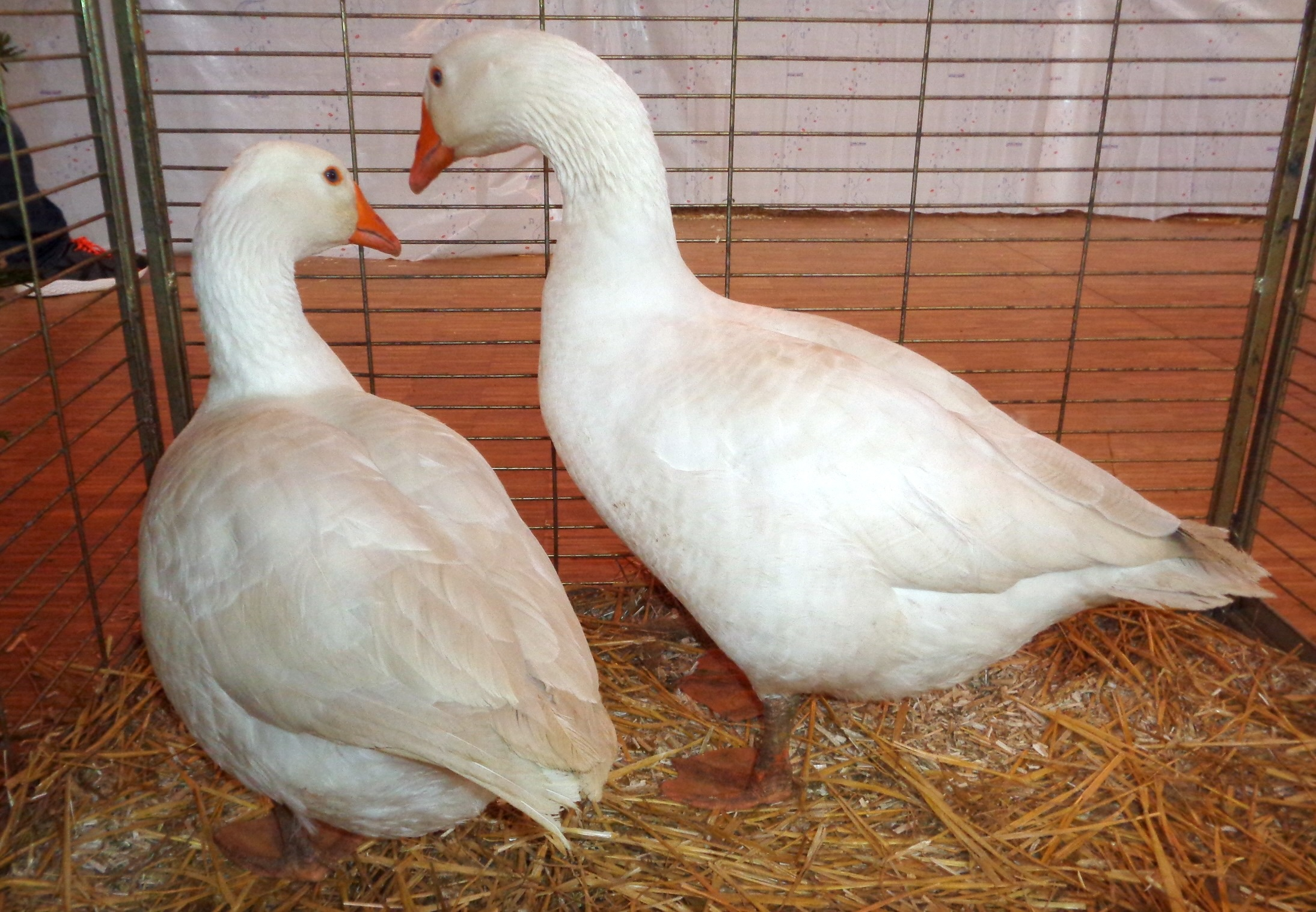
The white

The Alsace or Elsässer is a French breed of goose originating in the historical region of Alsace in eastern France, on the border with Germany. It was bred in the nineteenth century to grow a large and fatty liver for foie gras production. Like most other domestic geese, it derives from the wild species Anser anser.

== History ==
The Alsace was bred from about 1880 in the historical region of Alsace in eastern France – which at that time lay within the German Empire – particularly in the small valleys of southern Alsace – those of the Bruche, the Moder, the Sauer and the Zorn – as well as the Ried wetlands of the Rhine Valley. Local geese were cross-bred with Pomeranian and Emden stock with the specific aim of rearing geese with good aptitude for production of goose liver to be made into the paté de foie gras de Strasbourg, which had originated in Alsace in the previous century. Gustave Louis Maurice Strauss, writing in 1887, described it as markedly inferior to the Toulouse, capable of reaching weights when force-fed of little more than half those attainable by the Toulouse.

It was formally recognised as a breed in 1920. By 1960 numbers of the breed had fallen so far that the Union des Aviculteurs du Bas-Rhin took steps to conserve it, establishing centres of breeding. The total number of the geese was estimated in 1994 to be between 1000 and 10000; no population data has since been reported, and in 2025 the conservation status of the breed was unknown.

== Characteristics ==
Four colour varieties are recognised by the Fédération Française des Volailles: the grey, the pied, the white and the grey-spotted (tacheté gris et blanc); the breed society, the Poule et Oie d'Alsace Club de France, recognises the first three of these, but not the last-mentioned. The Entente Européenne recognises only the grey and the pied.

Body weight is some 4 to 4.5 kg for both ganders and geese. Ring size is 22 mm for both.

== Use ==
The Alsatian was bred specifically for production of foie gras d'oie. Geese may lay some 20 to 35 eggs per year; they are white and weigh about 120 g.
