= Brecon Buff Goose =

Welsh breed of domestic goose

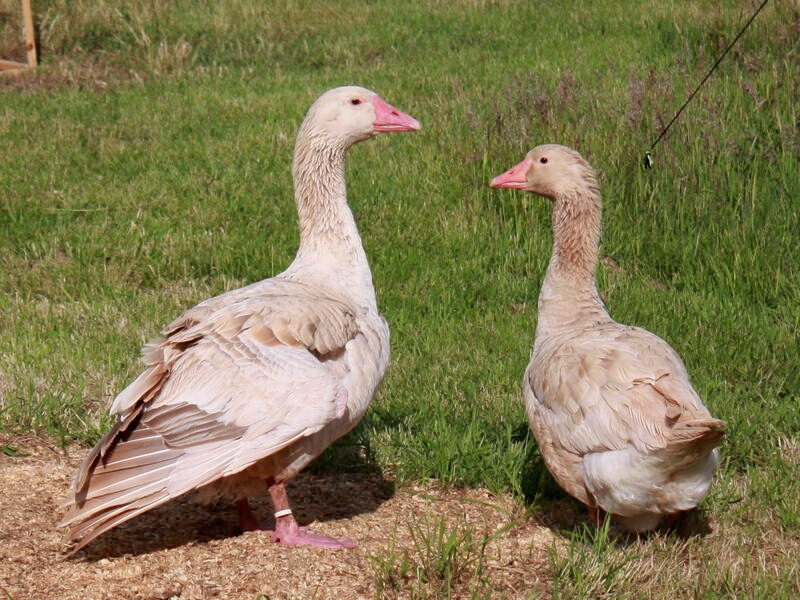
- A goose and gander
- Conservation status: FAO (2007): critical; RBST (2020): priority
- Country of origin: Wales

Traits
- Weight: Male: 7.3–9.1 kg; Female: 6.3–8.2 kg
- Egg colour: cream

Classification
- PCGB: medium

The Brecon Buff Goose is a Welsh breed of domestic goose.

== History ==
The Brecon Buff Goose originated in the area of the Brecon Beacons, in Brecknockshire in Wales. In about 1929 a certain Rhys Llewellyn found and acquired three geese of a uniform buff colour not seen in any other British goose breed. Using a gander of Embden type, he bred them until a stable true-breeding population was established. A standard was drawn up, and in 1934 was published in Feathered World. It was first included in the British Poultry Standards of the Poultry Club of Great Britain in 1954.

== Characteristics ==
The plumage is buff. The Brecon Buff Goose is distinguished from its larger relative, the American Buff Goose, not only by its weight but also by its pink feet and beak, which are characteristic of this breed. Weight is 7.3–9.1 kg for ganders, 6.3–8.2 kg for geese.
