= Pilgrim goose =

Breed of goose

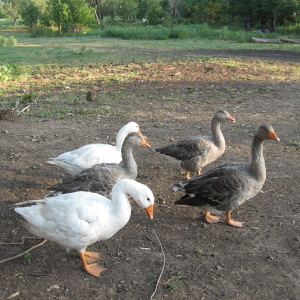
- A small flock of pilgrim geese
- Conservation status: Critically Endangered (ALBC)
- Other names: Settler Goose
- Country of origin: America
- Distribution: UK, America, Australia
- Use: Commercial (eggs and meat)

Traits
- Weight: Male: 6.3 – 8.2 kg; Female: 5.4 – 7.3 kg
- Skin colour: Male: White; Female: Olive-grey
- Egg colour: White

Classification
- APA: Medium goose

The Pilgrim – or, in Australia, Settler – is a breed of domestic goose. It is considered to be a relatively quiet, lightweight and medium-sized breed. The Pilgrim is a rare and critically endangered species according to the Livestock Conservancy and was added to the Standard of Perfection of the American Poultry Association in 1939. Generally, they can live for 15 to 25 years. In most breeds of geese, males and females are indistinguishable from one another; however, the pilgrim goose is well known for its auto-sexing trait. Males are characterised by white feathers while the females have grey. This sexual dimorphism makes pilgrim geese desirable for breeding as the sexes are easily determined. Their commercial use is primarily limited to the United States where they are bred for eggs and meat. They are known to grow relatively fast and are easy to handle.

== History ==
The exact origin of the pilgrim goose is unclear. According to Robert O. Hawes, there were numerous references to auto-sexing geese in colonial America, western England and Normandy (France), although they were never explicitly named. It is believed that pilgrim geese were descendants from European stock and exported to America by pilgrims, hence the name. However, Oscar Grow (a renowned waterfowl expert in the 1900s) contended that he developed the species in America in the 1930s during the Great Depression and that the breed's name was given by his wife in recognition of the family's pilgrimage from Iowa to Missouri. According to Dave Holderread, an experienced breeder and author in the field of waterfowl, there were likely small populations of auto-sexing geese in various locations throughout the world.

The first official documentation of the pilgrim goose was in 1935. In 1939, it was recognised in the America Poultry Association's Standard of Perfection and was later standardised in the UK in 1982. In Australia, the breed was named Settler goose by Andreas Stoll in 1984. In 1999, it was admitted into the Poultry Clubs standard.

== Description ==
The Pilgrim is a medium-sized and medium-weight breed. Ganders can weigh between 6.3 and 8.2 kg (14 and 18 lb) while the females weigh between 5.4 and 7.3 kg (12 and 16 lb). They have plump bodies with a smooth chest that is keelless (lacking a visible breastbone) and two rounded fatty lobes located on their abdomen. The head of a pilgrim goose is medium-sized and oval shaped, with a flattened crown (top of the head). Their necks are average in both length and thickness and have a slightly arched form. They also have a medium length beak which is straight and smoothly attached to the head. Both adult male and female pilgrim geese have webbed toes, short shanks and a knobless bill that are entirely orange in colour. They have a medium length tail which is found closely folded, while the wings are strong and found flush to the body. Both the ganders and geese have plumage that is hard and tight as well as relatively large eyes. However, the colour of their eyes and plumage differ between the two genders and are therefore the major features associated with their auto-sexing characteristic.

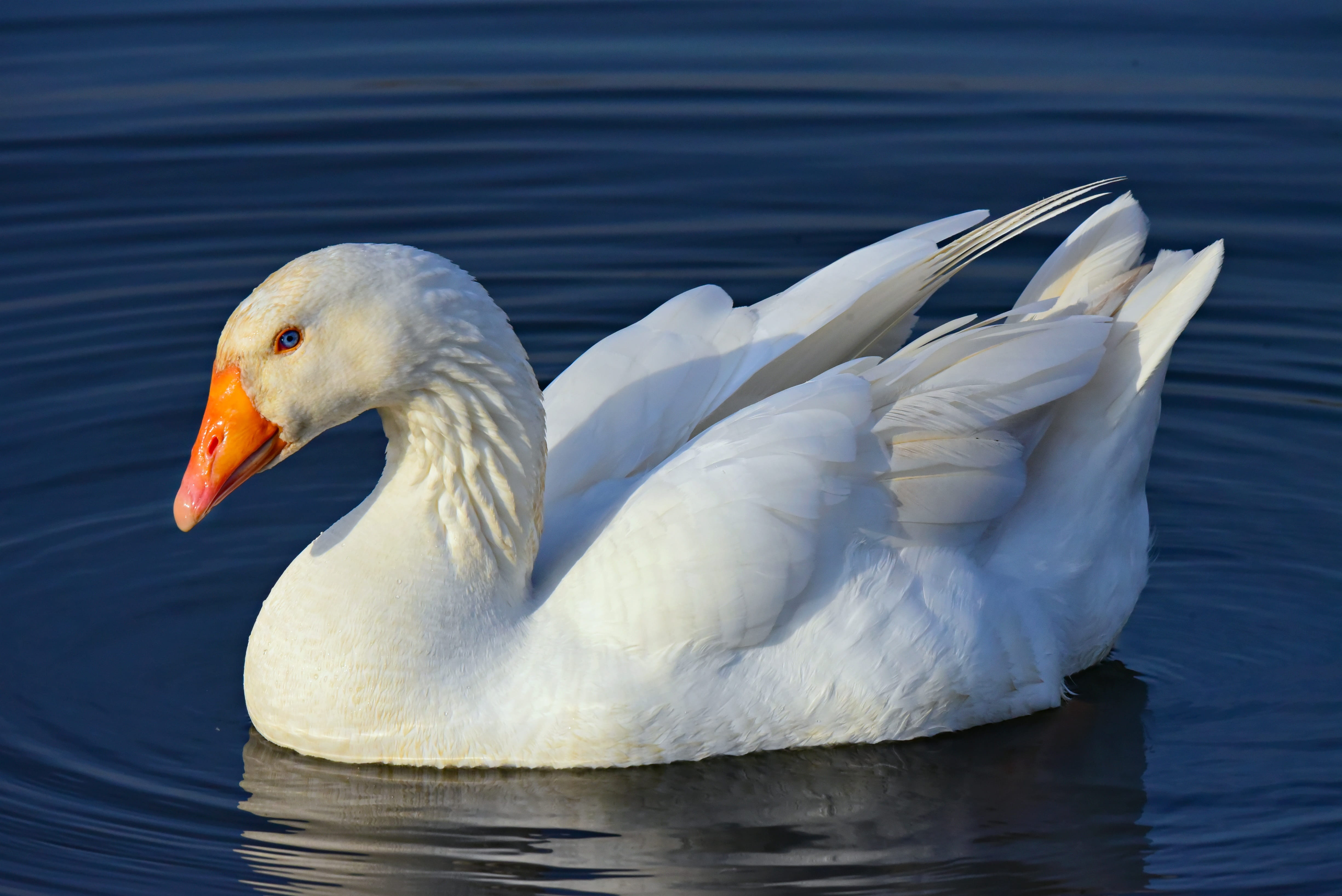
Male pilgrim goose with signature white plumage and blue eyes

== Sexual dimorphism ==
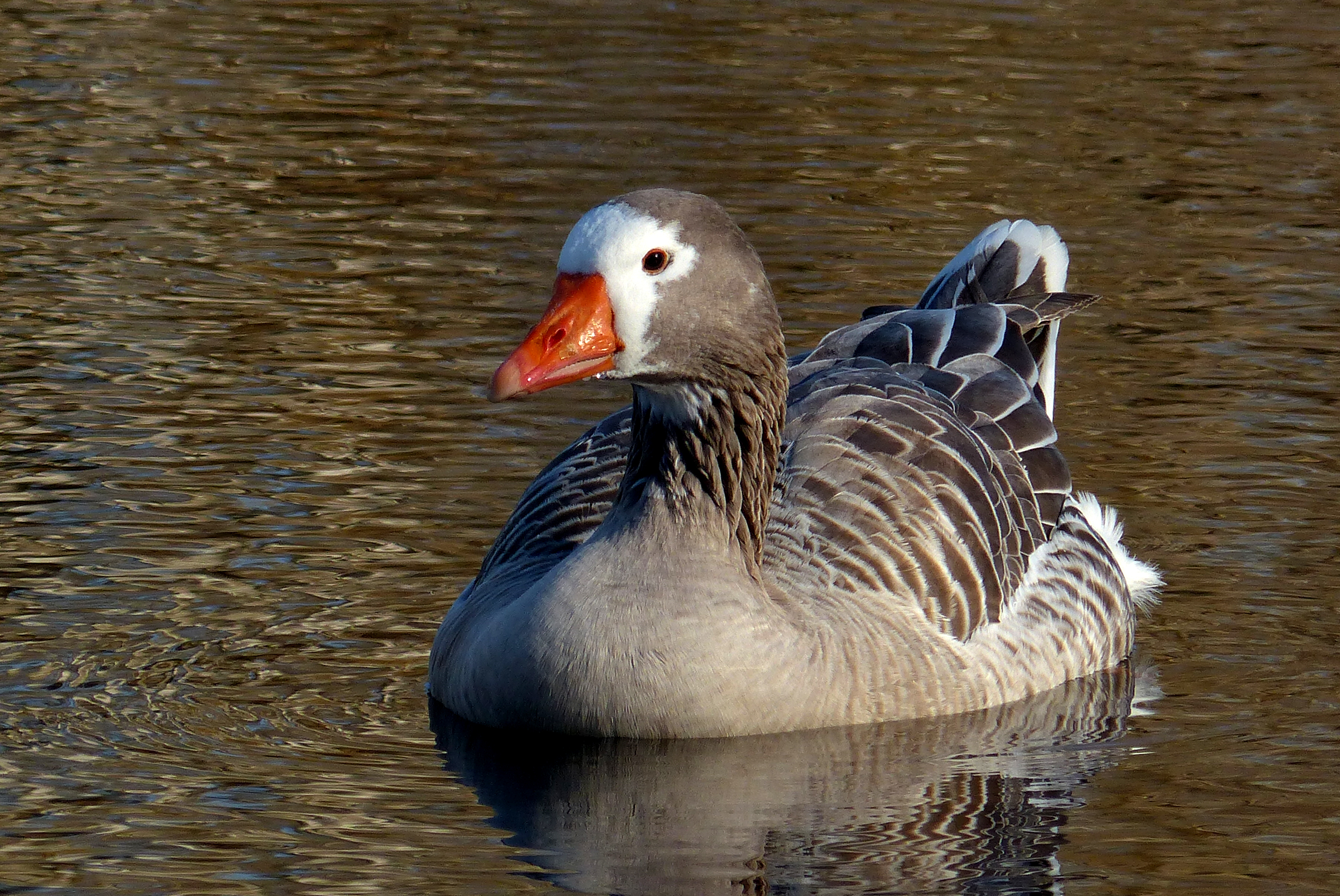
Female pilgrim goose with signature olive-grey plumage and white 'spectacles'

Pilgrim geese are renowned for their sexual dimorphism whereby the males and females are distinguishable by colour (particularly in terms of plumage, bill and eye colour). This is considered a rare condition among domestic birds. There are only four other auto-sexing breeds of geese: the West of England (Old English), the Choctaw (Cotton Patch), the Shetland and the Normandy goose.

In new-borns, the gender of a pilgrim goose is most easily identified according to bill colour, whilst the plumage colour distinctions become more apparent as the geese grow older. Male goslings have a silvery, light yellow down and a light coloured bill akin to an Embden gosling. By 12–14 days old, the males are distinctly white coloured. Female goslings have deep greyish-green down and a dark coloured bill similar to Toulouse goslings.

Adult male pilgrim geese are identified by a creamy white plumage (some may also have some grey markings on the rump, wings and tail) and blue eyes. Meanwhile, adult females have a mostly olive-grey plumage which is relatively lighter in comparison to the Toulouse and Pomeranian geese breeds. The females’ faces may also have traces of white starting from the beak and encircling the eyes, forming spectacles around them.

In the 1930s, there was a movement by the Society of the Pilgrim Goose to attempt to restore the popularity of sexually dimorphic geese in the United States. And, since pilgrim geese were the earliest known sexually dimorphic domestic geese in the United States, they were selected for breeding.

== Behaviour ==
Pilgrim geese are known for their docile and friendly temperament. They have a calm, personable and quiet disposition, which makes them less aggressive in comparison to other breeds. Furthermore, they have a curious personality and a high sense of awareness of their surrounding environment due to their strong vision. This makes them a suitable sentinel bird, as they will often alert owners of new activity such as intrusions or when someone or something arrives.

Furthermore, they are useful for weed control as they have a natural tendency to keep the weeds down by feeding on them. While doing so, their droppings will act as fertiliser for the pasture as their manure is environmentally friendly and free of chemicals.

Pilgrim geese also have strong parenting qualities and are good caretakers of their young. However, this often triggers a more protective behaviour (in contrast to their typically peaceful demeanour) during breeding season as they become defensive of their young. In particular, ganders may exhibit hissing or “honking” behaviours towards humans upon approaching their nest.

Pilgrim geese are also unique for their relatively strong flying abilities in comparison to other domesticated geese breeds.

== Feeding ==
Pilgrim geese are considered strong foragers with a relatively expansive diet. Specifically, plant material constitutes a large portion of their diet as they graze in pastures, orchards and yards as well as feed on dandelions and weeds. Furthermore, they will also feed on larvae and pupae (which can be found beneath rocks), aquatic animals, seeds, small fish, snails and crabs.

== Breeding and reproduction ==
A pilgrim goose can grow 10 pounds in about 10 weeks, which makes them a relatively fast growing breed. A male pilgrim goose typically mates with 3 to 5 geese at a time. In most instances, the ganders will not begin mating with the females until they start showing signs of egg production. Furthermore, even at just one year old, pilgrim geese will begin to lay and raise their own hatchlings. Generally, healthy geese will lay between 35 and 45 eggs annually. Their breeding season starts in late January or February and ends around June. During this period, they tend to exhibit protective behaviours. Peak production begins in the first week of April and is maintained until late May. While pilgrim geese are spring layers, studies have also shown that artificial lights can be used to trigger egg production several weeks earlier than normal. The eggs are white and large, and weigh approximately 6 to 7 ounces. The eggs have a relatively low fertility rate, with only about 50% of them hatching. The females usually set on 8 to 10 eggs at a time and hatching will begin after approximately 30 days.

According to Holderread, selection of pilgrim geese for breeding stock should favour those with broad backs and breast that are keelless as this indicates they are purebred. Meanwhile, birds with a knob, long necks and legs and shallow breasts should be avoided as these features suggest crossbreeding. Trap nests are often used in breeding to confine the female within the nest in order to determine individual egg production. Originally, trap nests were used for breeding of chickens, however, in 1950 it was reported that geese could also be successfully bred in trap nests.

In response to the growing interest of geese as a meat animal in the United States, a breeding project was initiated in 1951 to investigate the breeding techniques associated with increasing the reproductive ability of geese. According to the researchers of the study, there were no previous experimental studies documenting breeding techniques on a commercial basis. Hence, this study was conducted to obtain records for egg production, fertility and hatchability. The study started in the spring of 1950 with 2 male and 4 female pilgrim geese which were mated together in two breeding pens. The geese were bred progressively for 5 years and by 1954, there were 16 breeding pens each with 1 gander and 5 females. All the geese were trap-nested 7 days a week for the duration of the laying season. After 3 years of selection, the average egg production increased from 14 to 28. Furthermore, the highest producing goose in 1951 laid 38 eggs whereas the highest producing goose in 1952 laid 44 eggs and in 1953 laid 59 eggs. Improvements in fertility and hatchability were also recorded as all eggs laid were incubated. The fertility rate in 1951 was 66% and increased to 71% in 1952 and 74% in 1953. The hatchability rate of fertile eggs in 1951 was 71% and increased to 77% in 1953. Notably, fertility was found to decline towards the end of the breeding season whereas hatchability remained stabled throughout. Finally, the rearing mortality (between birth to 16 weeks old) decreased between 1951 and 1953 from 11% to 4%. In terms of the relationship between age and breeding, the study showed that pilgrim geese tend to lay more eggs in their second, third and fourth years compared to their first year. The size of the eggs increase by about 25% between the first and second years. However, eggs laid by younger females had a lower hatchability rate of 68% compared to older females with a hatchability rate of 87%.
