= Sebastopol goose =

Breed of goose

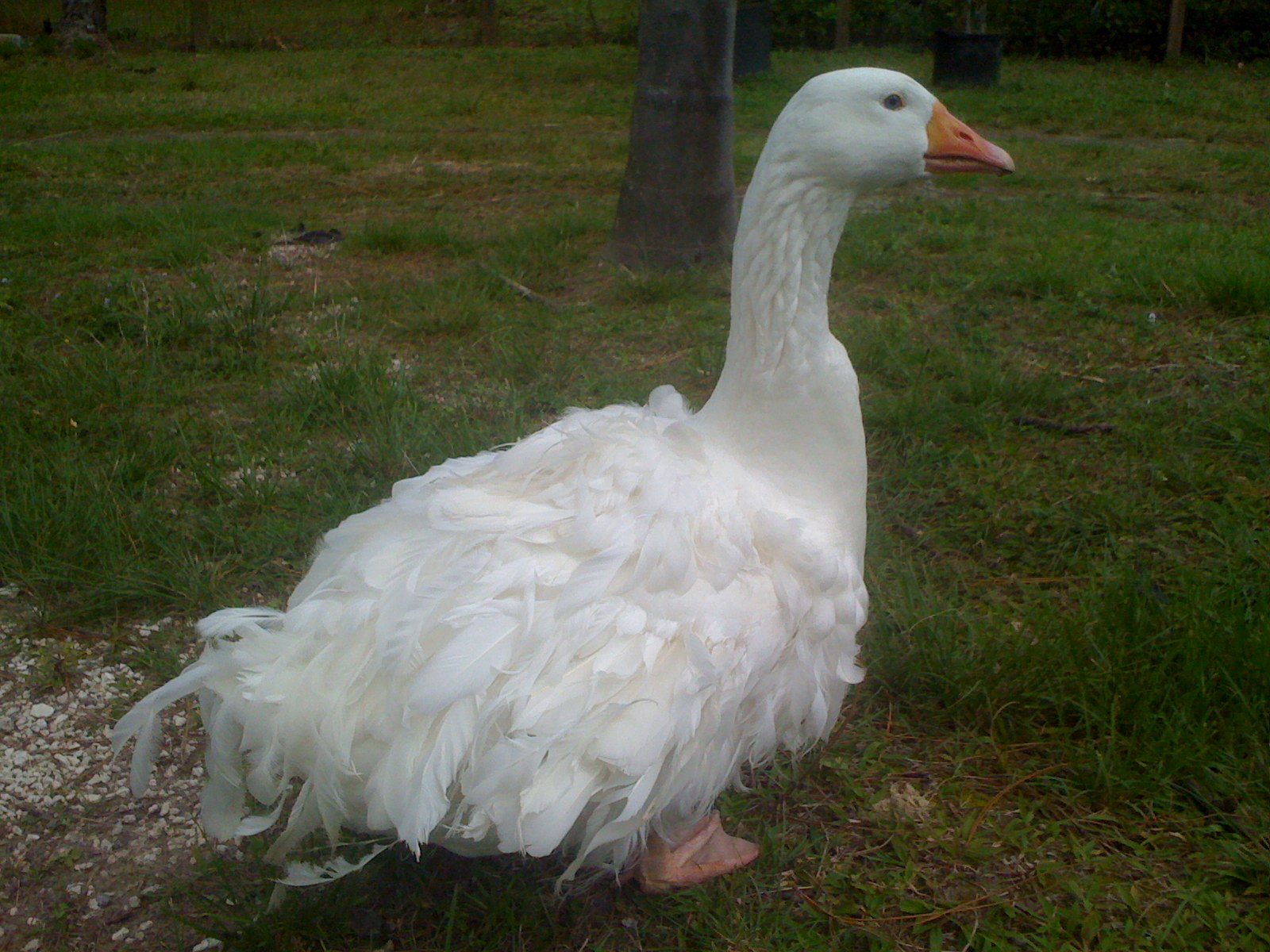
White Sebastopol goose

The Sebastopol is a breed of domestic goose, descended from the European greylag goose. First exhibited in England in 1860 under the name "Sebastopol goose", they were also referred to as "Danubian geese", a name first used for the breed in Ireland in 1863. Danubian was used as a synonym in the 19th century; and only given precedence by Edward Brown after the turn of the 19th century. The Sebastopol is a medium-sized goose with long, white curly feathers. The feathers of the neck are smooth and sometimes greyish brown. Crosses have produced all-grey, buff, and saddle back variants. Feathers on the breast may be curly (frizzle) or smooth. The gander weighs 12–14 lb (5.4–6.4 kg) while the goose weighs 10–12 lb (4.5–5.4 kg). The legs and shanks are orange and the eyes bright blue. Grey and buff coloured Sebastopol have brown eyes. On average, females produce 25–35 eggs per year. Though domesticated breeds of geese generally retain some flight ability, Sebastopols cannot fly well due to the curliness of their feathers and have difficulty getting off the ground. They need plenty of water to keep themselves clean, and to clean their sinuses (as do all waterfowl).

In German, they are called Lockengans or Struppgans, meaning "curl-goose" and "unkempt goose".

== History ==
The breed has been said to have been developed in Central Europe along the Danube and the Black Sea, thoug the birds have been documented as originally from the Crimea and sent from the port of Sevastopol, as the name implies, and arrived in England in 1860. By the 19th century, they were found in all the countries surrounding the Black Sea. The alternate name Danubian reflected their prevalence around the River Danube. They were originally bred to use their curly feathers in pillows and quilts.

== Breeding ==
Breeding over the last 100 years has increased the average weight of the birds by 30%. This occurred in America due to matings with Embden geese made in the late 19th century.

== See also ==
- List of goose breeds
- Toulouse Goose

== Gallery ==
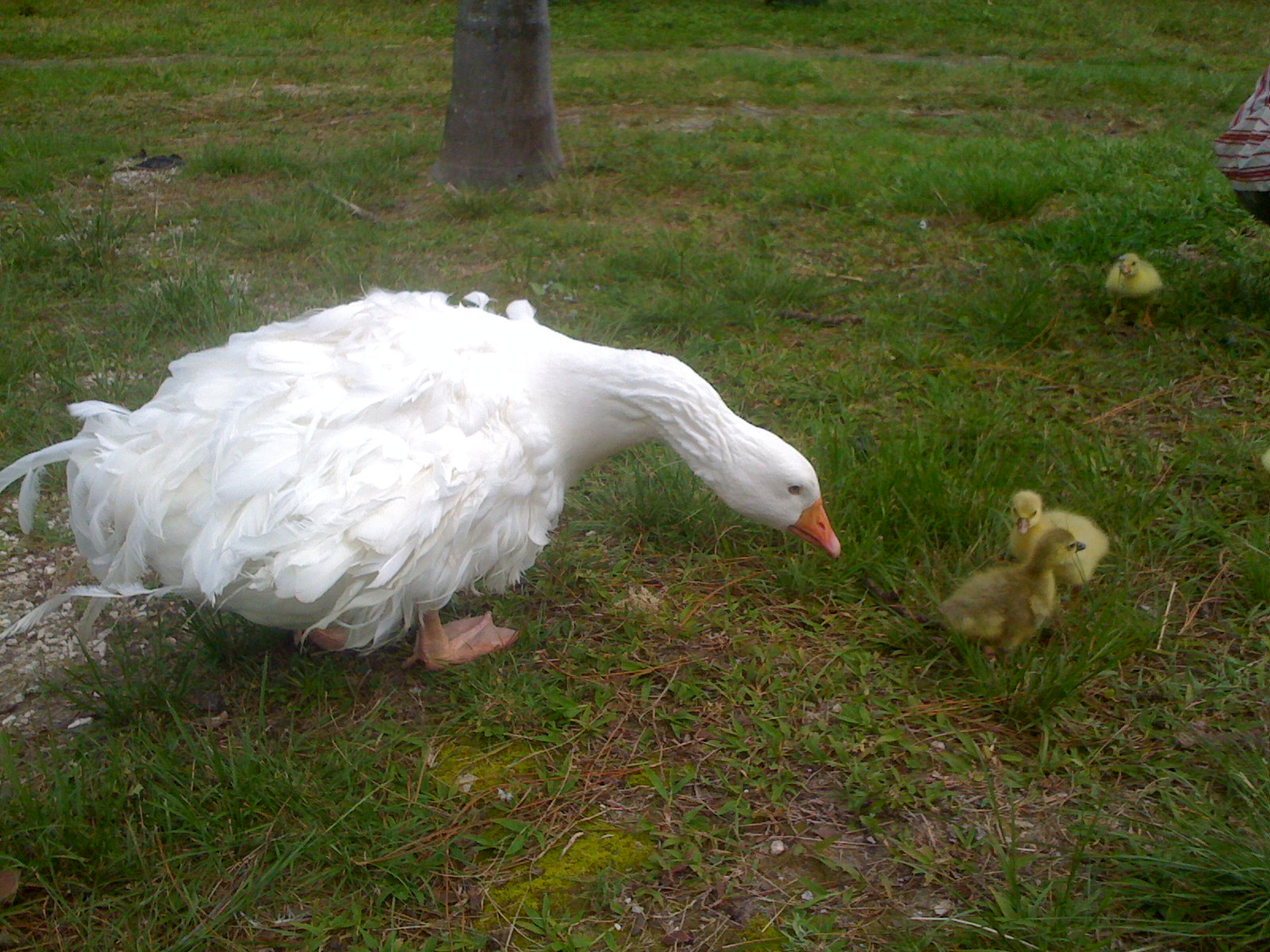
Sebastopol goose and goslings

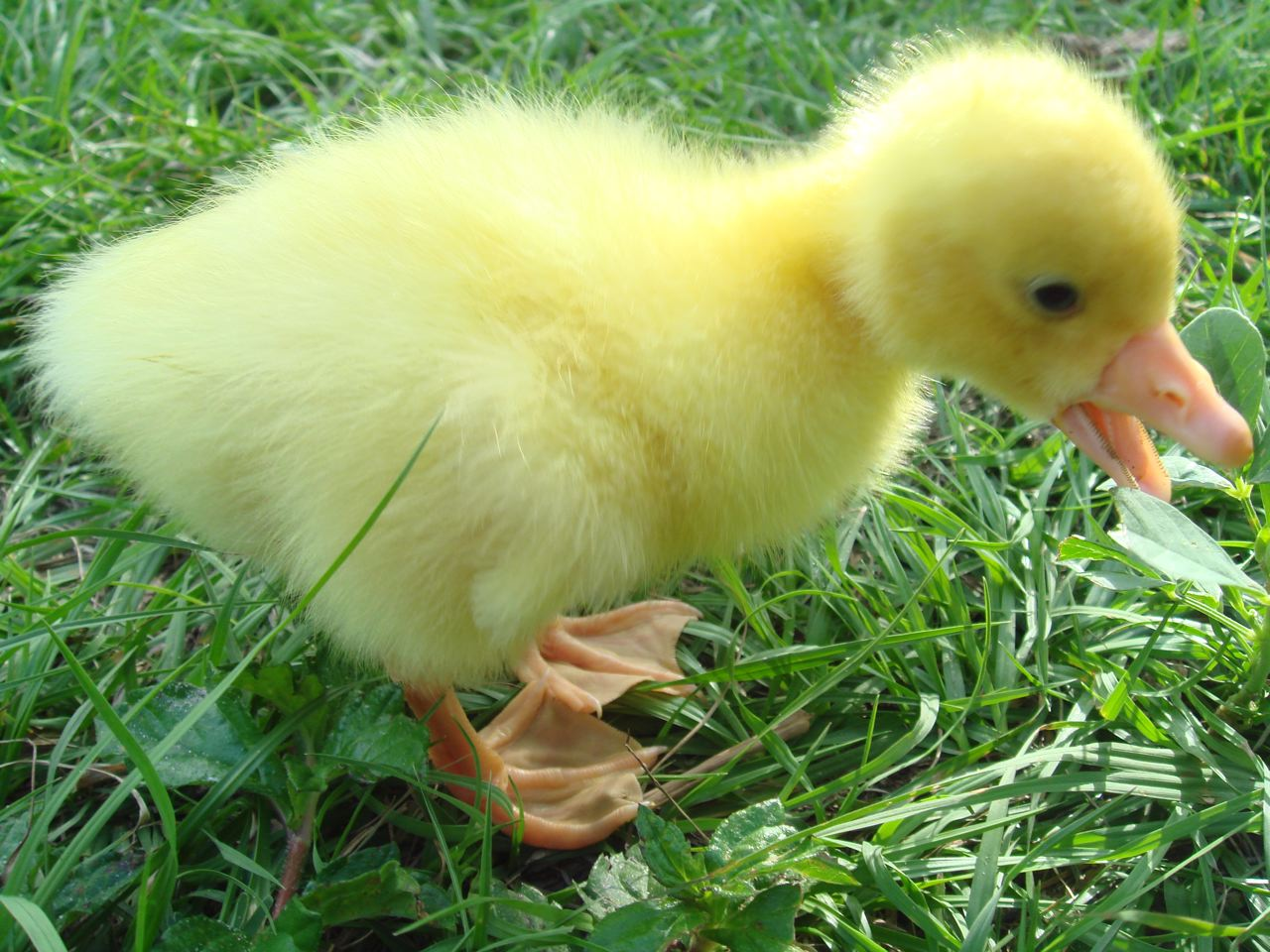
White gosling

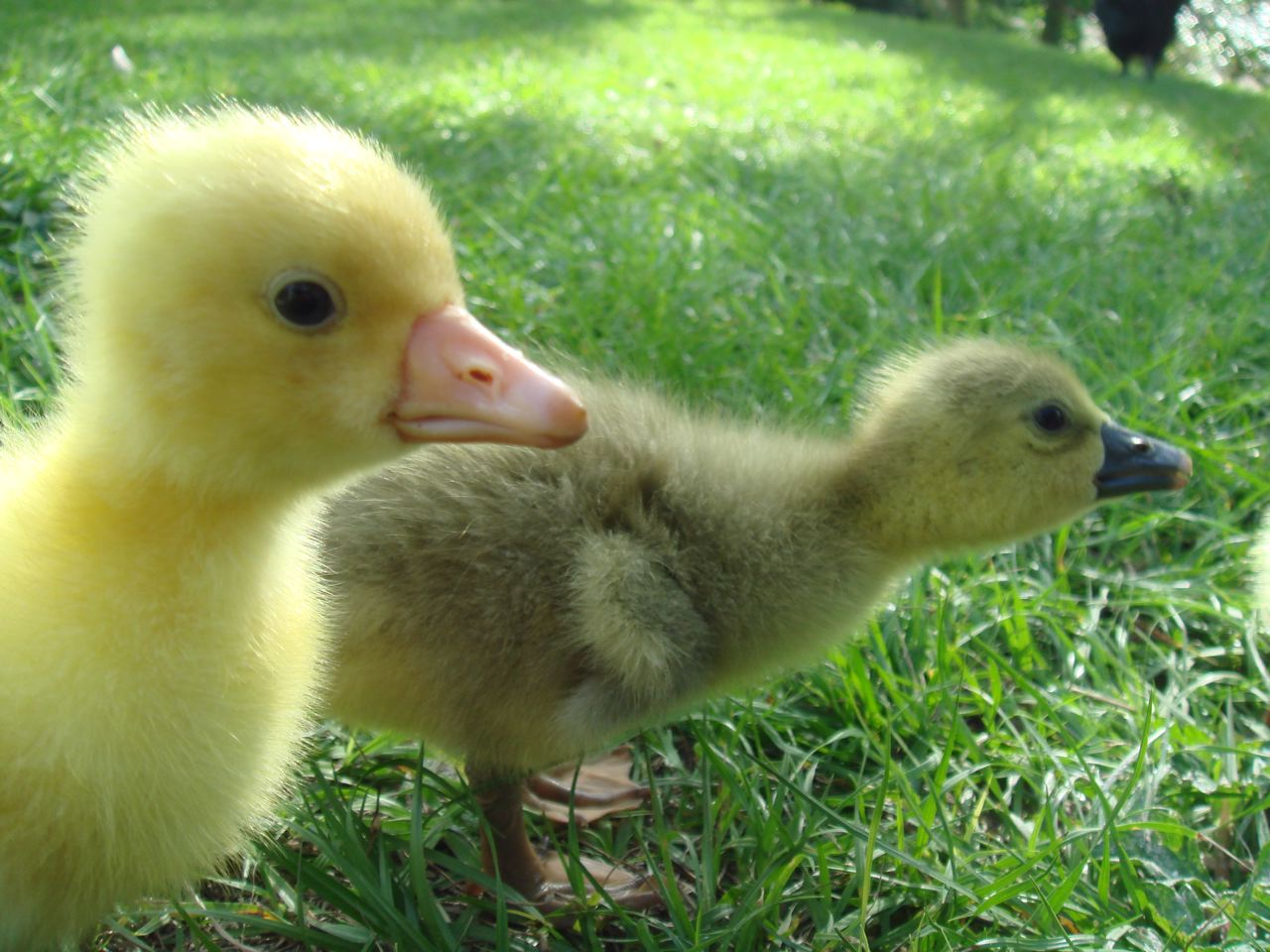
White and blue goslings

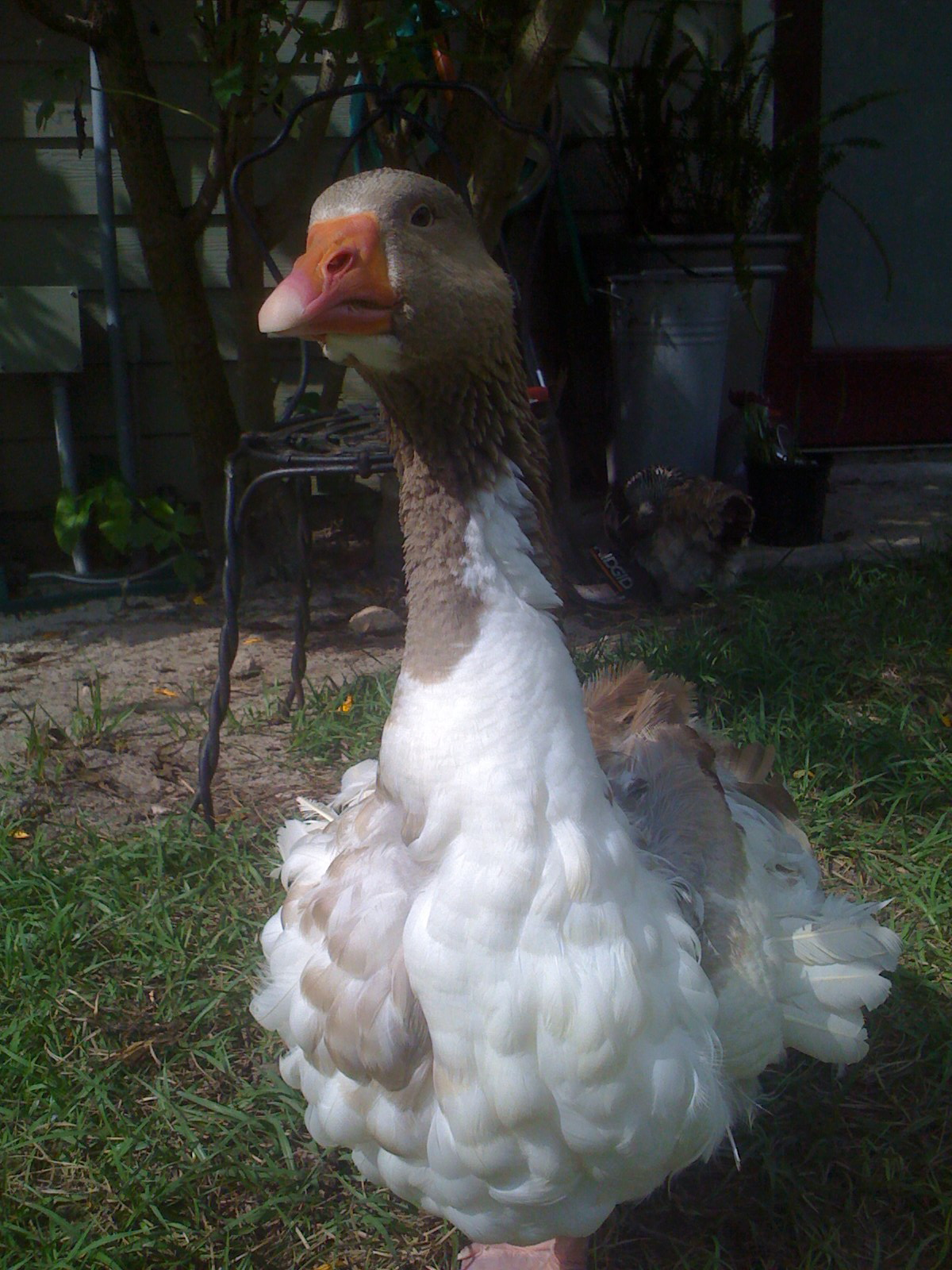
Rare saddleback colour scheme

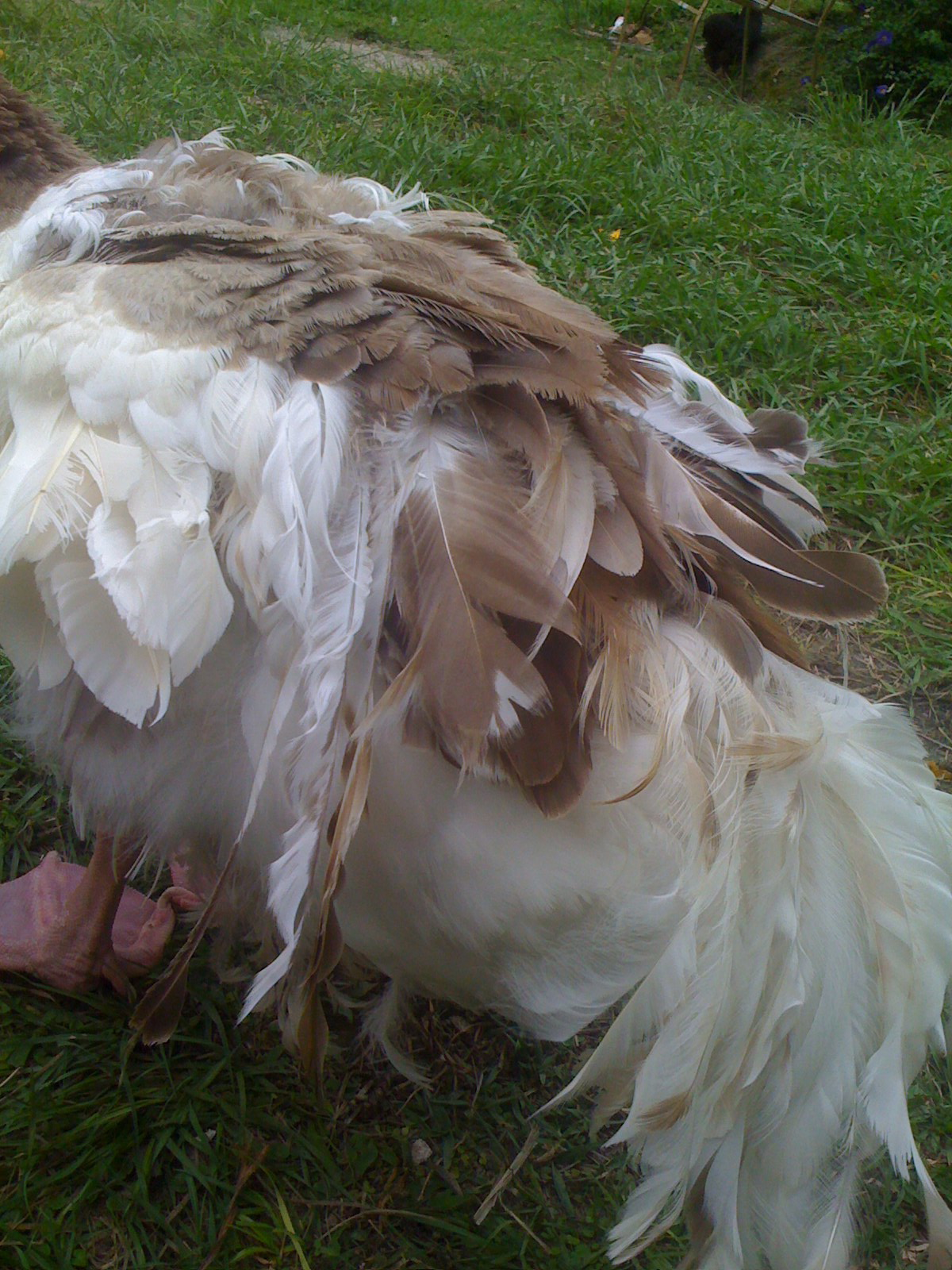
Close up of saddleback back colouring

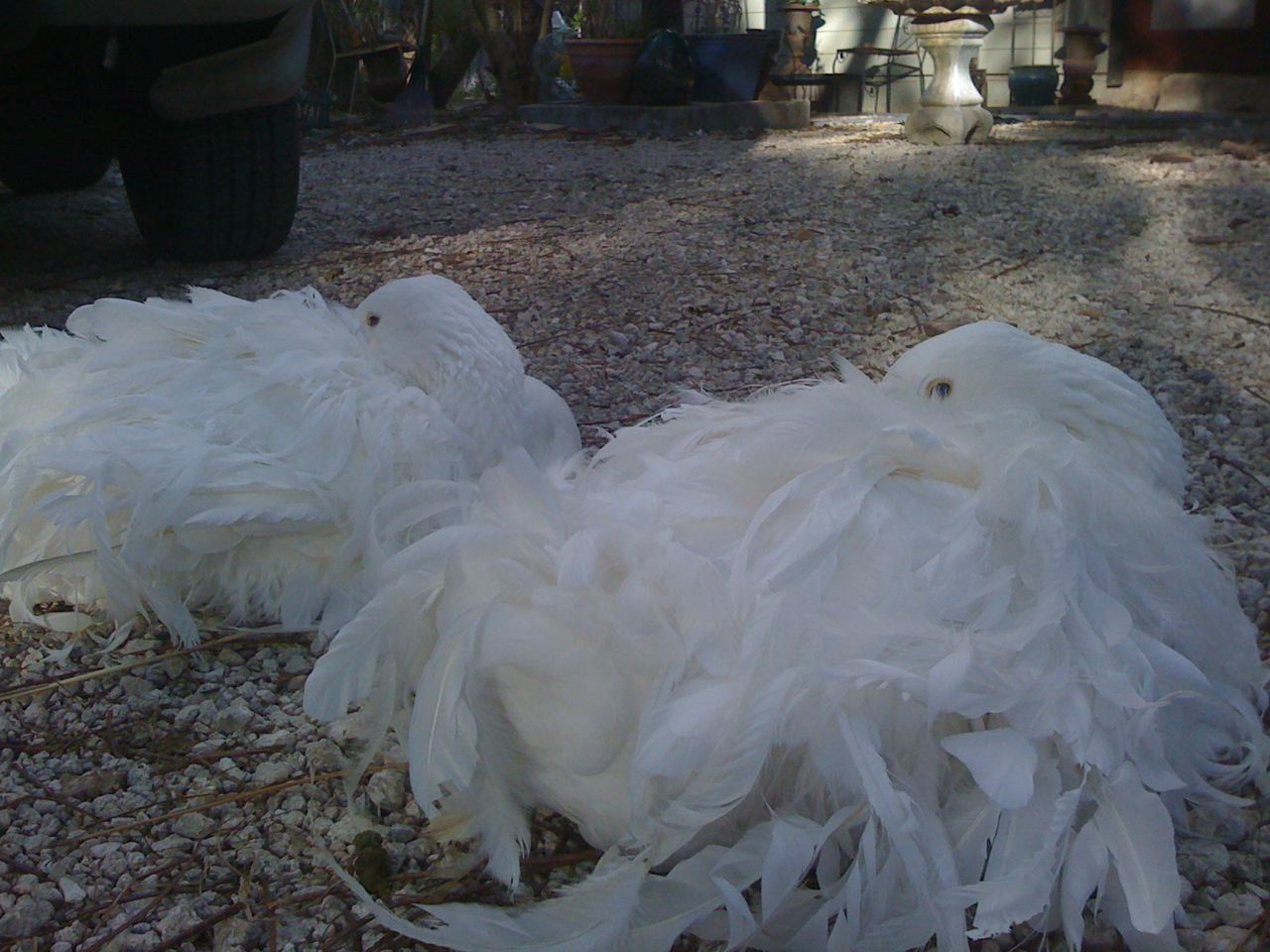
Two white Sebastopols
