= Vištinės =

Breed of goose

- Conservation status: FAO (2007): critical; DAD-IS (2021): at risk
- Other names: Vištinės žąsys; Vishtines
- Country of origin: Lithuania

Traits
- Weight: Male: 6–6.5 kg; Female: 5.5–6 kg
- Colour: white

Classification
- APA: no
- EE: no
- PCGB: no

The Vištinės or Vishtines is a Lithuanian breed of domestic goose. It was developed by selective breeding of traditional Lithuanian geese, with some later influence from the East Prussian, Emden and Pomeranian breeds.

== History ==
The Vištinės was developed by selective breeding of traditional Lithuanian geese; there was some later intromission from the East Prussian, Emden and Pomeranian breeds. It was formerly widespread in Lithuania, but was largely displaced by more proactive imported breeds. In 2007 its conservation status was listed by the FAO as "critical".

The Vištinės contributed to the development of the white Kuban goose in the Kuban region of Russia.

== Characteristics ==
The birds are deep and broad in the body, with short legs, a curving neck and a full breast. Ganders weigh some 6–6.5 kg, geese about 0.5 kg less. The plumage is entirely white, the feet and shanks orange, and the beak orange-red.

== Use ==
Geese lay some 30-40 eggs per year, with an average weight of 160–170 g; about 60% may be expected to hatch. Goslings weigh up to 4 kg at 60 days; birds reach maturity at 9–10 months. The carcase yield is about 70%, of which some 13–14% is fat.
