= List of goose breeds =

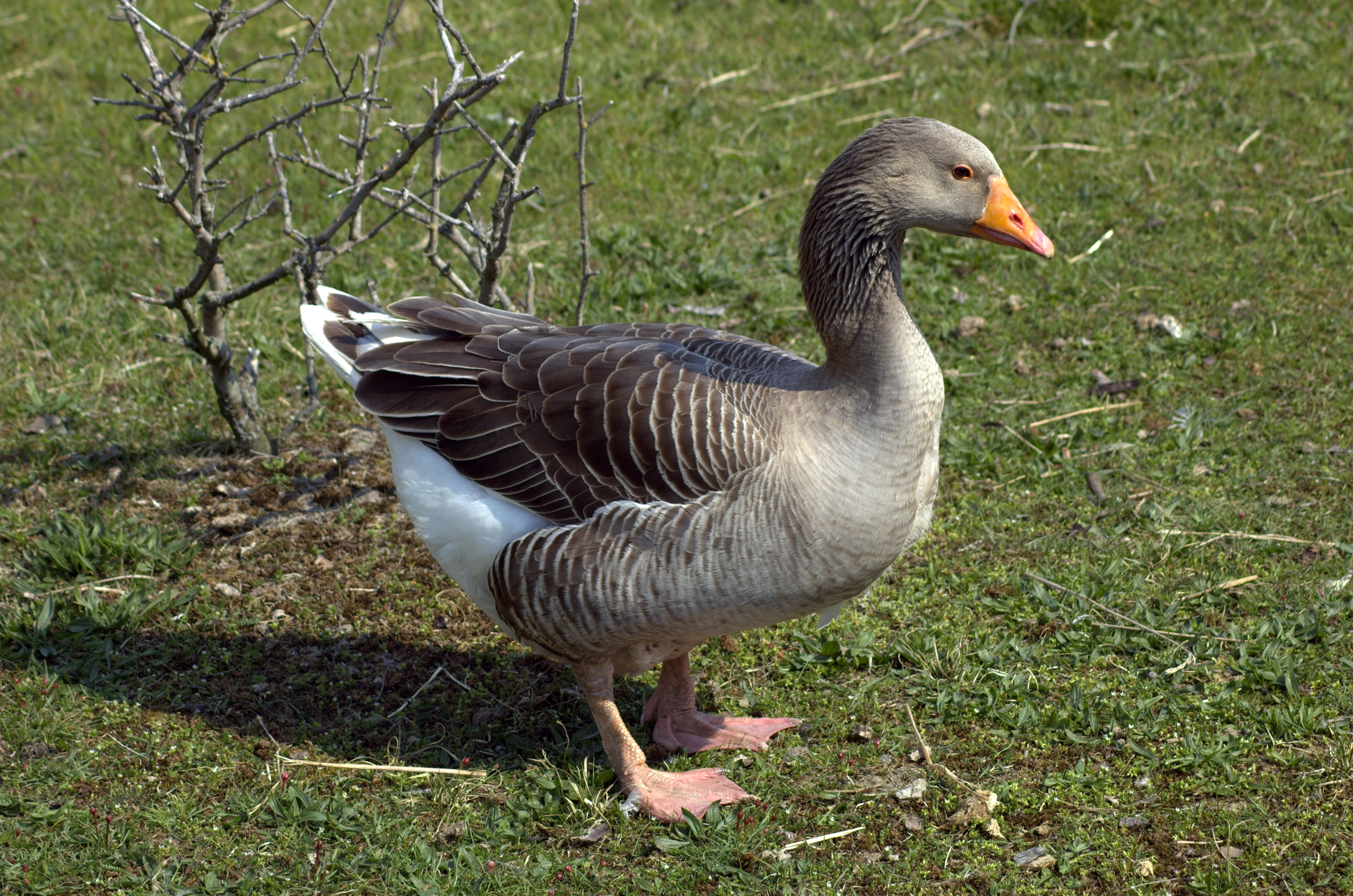
A greylag-like domestic goose

This is a list of breeds of domestic goose; species with semi-domestic populations are included. Geese are bred mainly for their meat, which is particularly popular in Germanic languages countries around Christmas. Of lesser commercial importance is goose breeding for eggs, schmaltz, or for the fattened liver (foie gras). A few specialized breeds have been created for the main purpose of weed control (e.g. the Cotton Patch Goose), or as guard animals and (in former times) for goose fights (e.g., the Steinbach Fighting Goose and Tula Fighting Goose).

Goose breeds are usually grouped into three weight classes: heavy, medium and light. Most domestic geese are descended from the greylag goose (Anser anser). The Chinese and African Geese are the domestic breeds of the swan goose (A. cygnoides); they can be recognized by their prominent bill knob.

Some breeds, like the Obroshin Goose and Steinbach Fighting Goose, originated in hybrids between these species (the hybrid males are usually fertile – see Haldane's Rule). In addition, two goose species are kept as domestic animals in some locations, but are not completely domesticated yet and no distinct breeds have been developed.

== Breeds ==
=== Breeds derived from the greylag goose ===
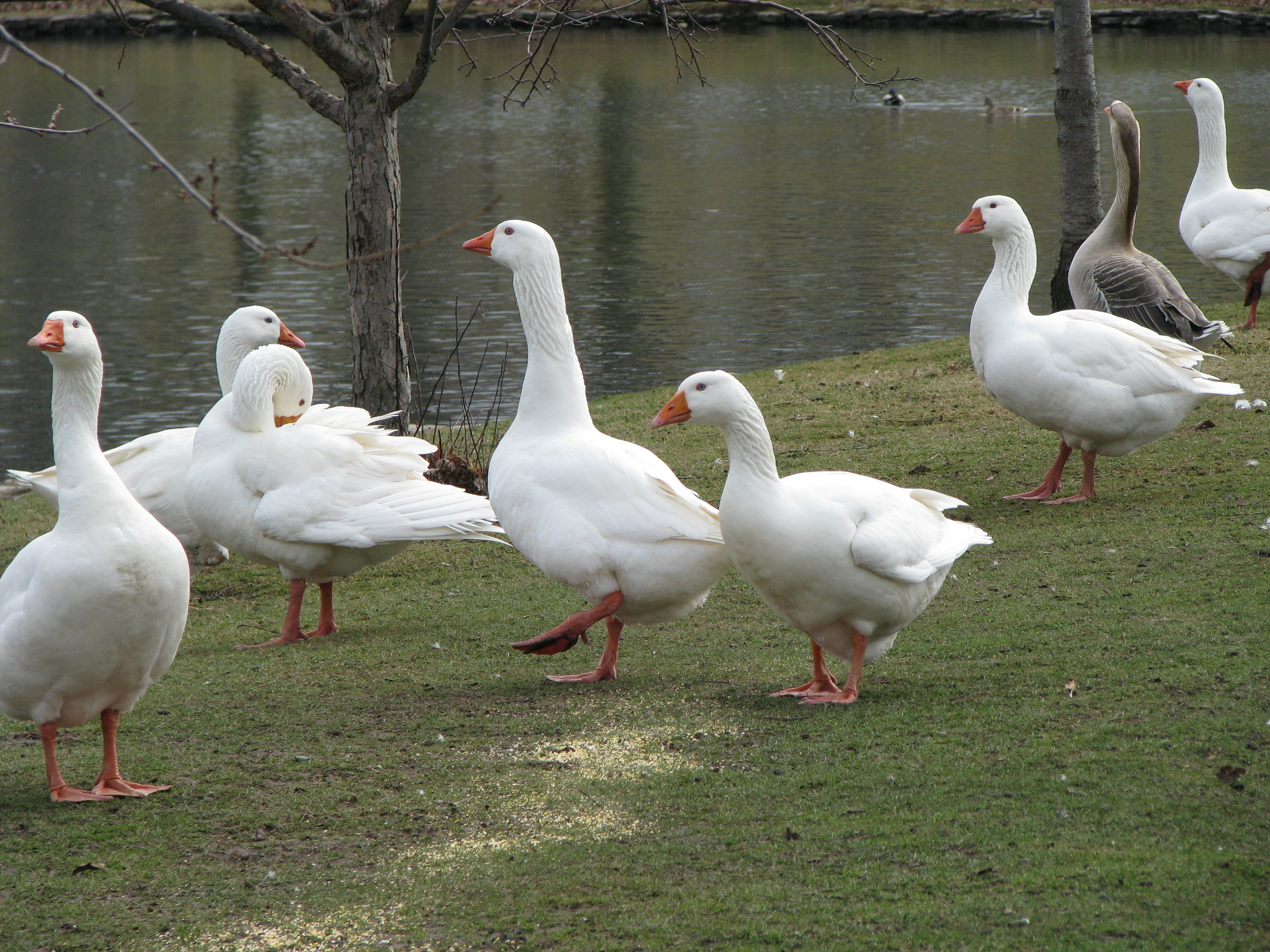
A flock of Emden geese

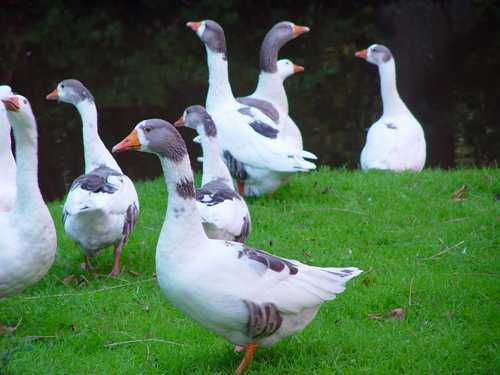
A flock of Twente geese

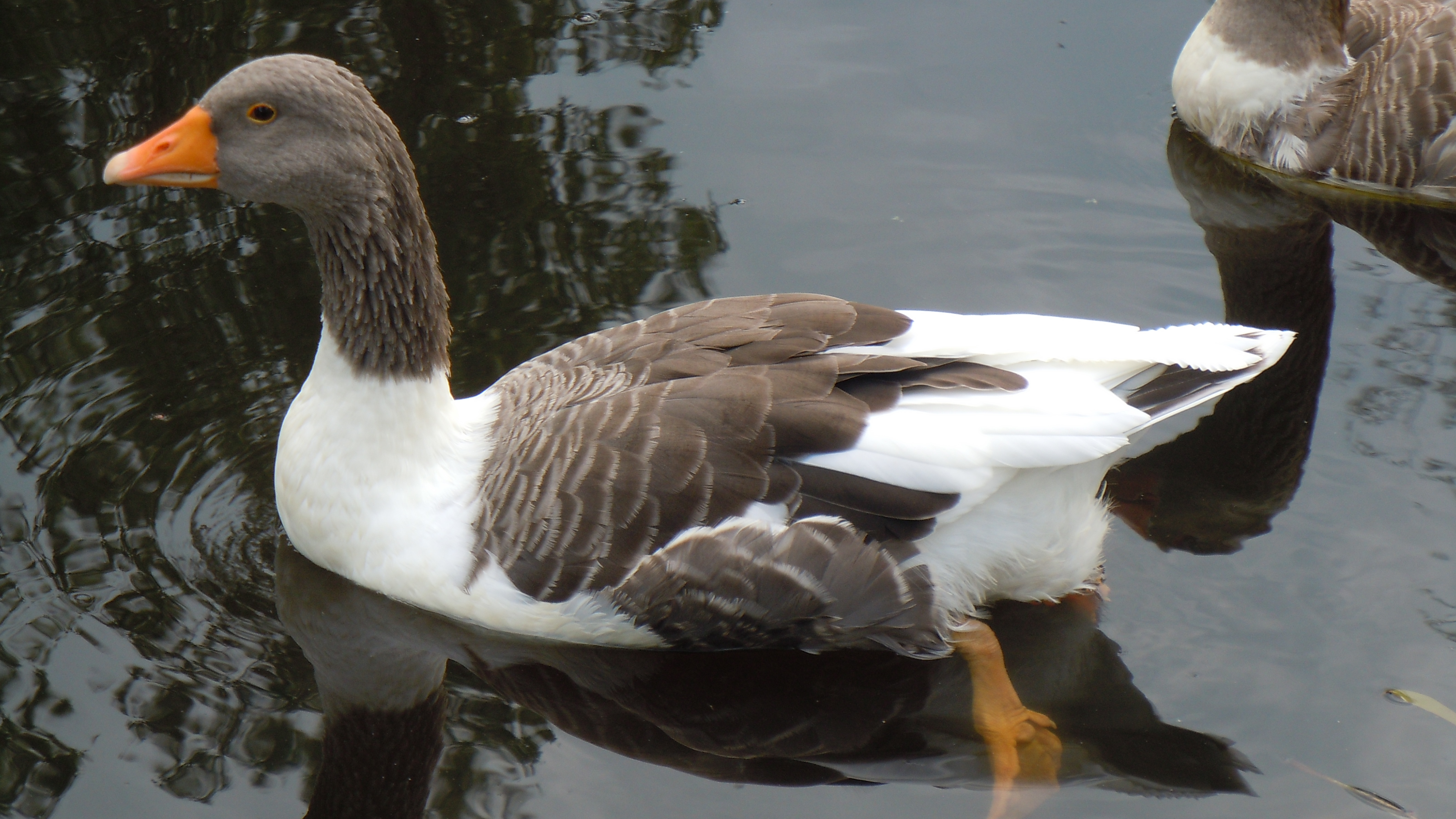
Öland goose in pond. One of about 100 in existence.

- Adler goose (Адлерская)
- Alsatian goose (Oie d'Alsace)
- American buff goose
- Amorstream goose
- Anhui goose
- Aonghus goose
- Arzamas goose (Арзамасская)
- Austrian landrace (Österreichische landgans)
- Balien Eu goose
- Bavarian landrace (Bayerische Landgans)
- Benkov goose (Бяла Бенковска гъска)
- Bilgorey goose
- Bogdanovski goose (= Javakhetian goose)
- Bourbon goose (Oie du Bourbonnais, Blanche de Bourbonnais)
- Brecon buff goose
- Buff back goose
- Celle goose (Celler Gans)
- Cotton Patch goose
- Curly breasted Sebastopol goose
- Czech goose (Česká husa)
- Czech crested goose (Česká chocholatá hus)
- Danish landrace goose (Danske gæs: grå, gråbroget)
- Daoxian goose
- Diepholz goose (Diepholzer Gans)
- Drava goose (Dravska guska)
- Emden goose (Emdener Gans)
- Emporda goose (Emporda-Gans)
- English saddleback goose (→Buff back goose)
- Euskal Antzara goose
- Faroese goose (Færøske gæs)
- Fighting goose (= Steinbacher Goose)
- Flemish goose (Oie flamande)
- Franconian goose (Fränkische Landgans)
- Garbonosa goose
- German laying goose (Deutsche Legegans)
- Gorki goose (Горьковская or Линдовская)
- Gorkowska goose
- Greyback goose
- Han Tah Pra goose
- Hungarian goose
- Hwo goose
- Javakhetian goose
- Kaluga goose
- Kangan goose
- Kars goose
- Kartuzy landrace (Kartuska)
- Kashmir Anz (Koshur Anez)
- Kholmogory goose (Холмогорская)
- Kielce landrace (Kielecka)
- Koean goose
- Krasnozerskoye goose (Краснозёрская, Krasnozy, Skoye)
- Kuban goose (Кубанская)
- Landes goose (Oie des Landes)
- Large grey goose
- Leine goose (Leinegans)
- Lingzian goose
- Likewu goose
- Lionhead goose
- Lippe goose (Lippegans)
- Local geese of Karal and Massakory
- Local goose of Mandelia
- Lubelska goose
- Mongolian local geese
- Normandy goose (Oie normande; including Crested Normandy goose)
- Norwegian white goose (Norsk hvit gås)
- Nungan Mieu goose
- Obroshino goose (Оброшинська)
- Öland goose (Ölandsgås)
- Padans goose (Oca Padovana)
- Pereyaslav goose (Переяславская)
- Philippine domestic goose
- Pilgrim goose
- Pink-footed goose
- Podkarpacka goose
- Poitou goose (Oie du Poitou, Blanche de Poitou)
- Polish oat goose
- Pomeranian goose (including Pomeranian Saddleback)
- Pskov bald goose (Псковская)
- Qingyang goose
- Rhenish goose
- Rhineland laying goose (Rheinische Legegans, extinct breed)
- Romanic goose (Romaanse gans)
- Roman goose (Oca Italiano)
- Romny goose
- Russian goose
- Rypinska goose
- Rung goose
- Scania goose (Skånegås)
- Sebastopol goose (Lockengans)
- Shadrinsk goose (→Ural Goose)
- Shetland goose
- Slovak white goose (Slovenská hus)
- Smålen goose (Smålensgås)
- Solnechnogorsk goose
- Steinbacher goose (Steinbacher Kampfgans)
- Subcarpathian goose (Podkarpacka)
- Suwalska goose (Suwałska)
- Suchovy goose (Suchovská hus)
- Synthetic Ukrainian goose
- Tame goose
- Toulouse goose (including Light Toulouse)
- Touraine goose (Oie de Touraine)
- Tufted Roman goose (→Roman goose)
- Tula goose (Tульская бойцовая)
- Turkish goose
- Twente goose (Twentse landgans)
- Ural goose or Shadrin goose (Уральская or Шадринская)
- Venetian goose (Oca Pezzata Veneta)
- Vištinės goose (Vištinės žąsys)
- Vladimir clay goose (Владимирская глинистая)
- West of England goose (including crested goose)
- Whet goose
- White Hungarian goose
- White Italian goose (→Roman goose)
- White Norman goose
- Zatory landrace (Zatorska)

=== Breeds derived from the swan goose ===
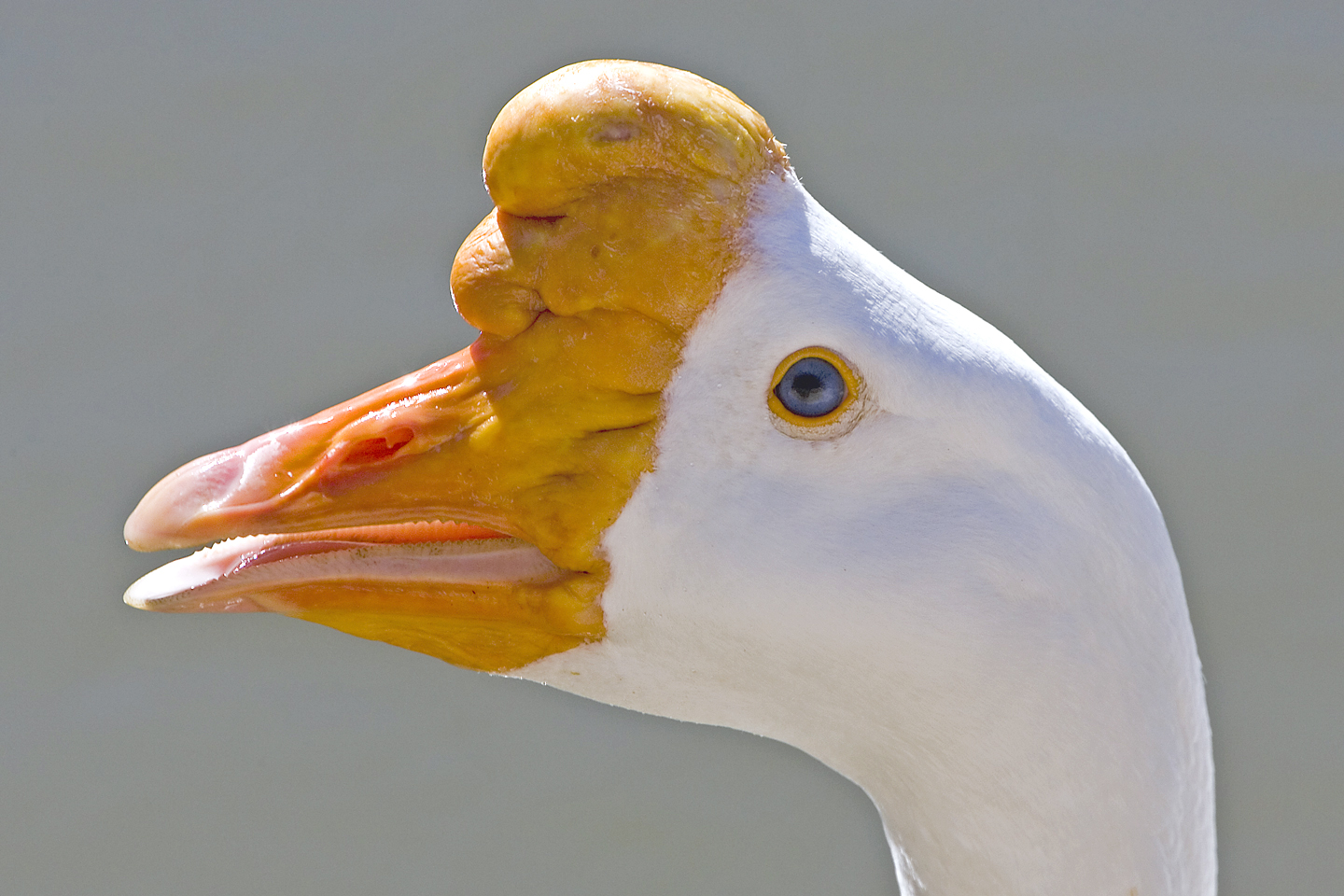
Head of a white Chinese goose

- African goose
- Changle goose
- Chinese goose
- Co goose
- Huoyan goose
- Shitou goose
- Sichuan white goose
- Taihu goose
- Wanxi white goose
- Wugang goose
- Wulong goose
- Wuzhong goose
- Xupu goose
- Xingguo grey goose
- Yanguiang goose
- Yan goose
- Yili goose
- Yong Kang grey goose
- Zhedong goose
- Zhejiang white goose
- Zie goose

== Auto-sexing goose ==
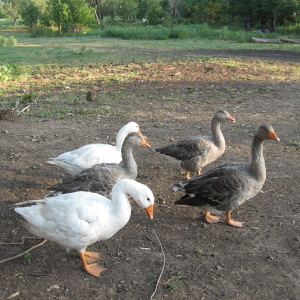
A small flock of Pilgrim Geese - an example of color-sexing goose; males are white, females are gray

The plumage of male and female goose is usually the same. However, there are few auto-sexing goose, which are sexually dimorphic and the sex can be identified by the first look by plumage. In general, ganders are white and females are either entirely gray, or pied gray and white.

- Cotton Patch Goose
- Normandy Goose
- Pilgrim Goose
- Shetland Goose
- West of England Goose

== Semi-domesticated goose species ==
- Canada goose
- Egyptian goose
