= Cotton Patch =

American breed of goose

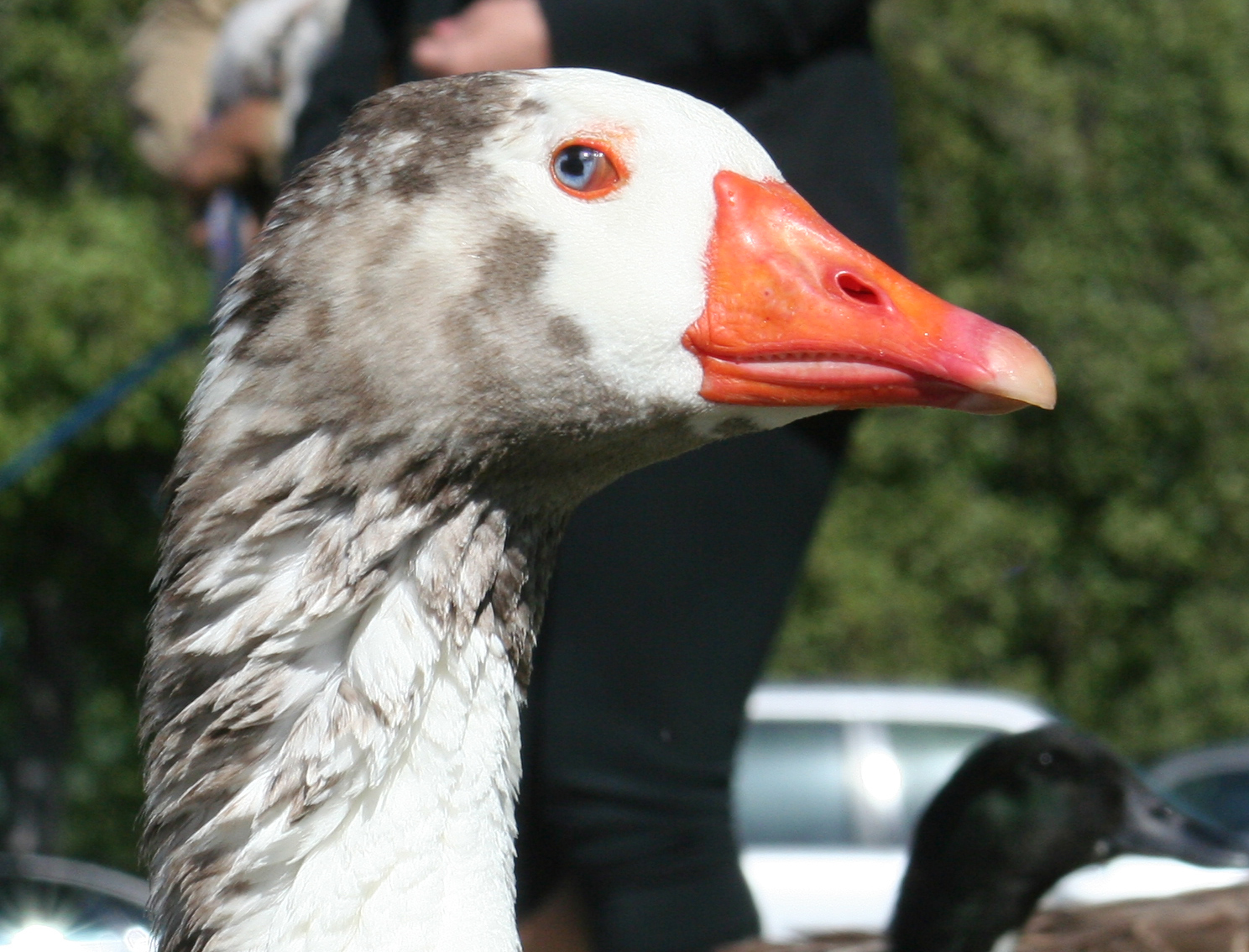
- Conservation status: FAO (2007): not listed; SPPA (2025): critical; DAD-IS (2026): not listed; TLC (2026): threatened
- Country of origin: United States
- Use: vegetation management; eggs; meat; goose-fat; feathers; down

Traits
- Weight: Male: 4.5–5.5 kg (10–12 lb); Female: 3.5–4.5 kg (8–10 lb)
- Colour: Gander: white with some dove grey; Goose: grey with some white markings

Classification
- APA: no
- EE: no
- PCGB: no

Notes
- auto-sexing
- goose; Anser anser

The Cotton Patch is an American breed of goose. It was formerly widespread in the south-eastern United States; in the twenty-first century it is an endangered breed. It is named for its traditional use to clear weeds from fields of cotton, corn and other crops. Like most other domestic geese, it derives from the wild species Anser anser. It is an auto-sexing breed – the gander and goose are immediately distinguishable because they are of different colours.

== History ==
The origins of the Cotton Patch are unknown. It is thought to derive from European geese brought to the New World in the colonial era. Until the mid-twentieth century it was extensively used in the south-eastern United States to keep fields of crops such as cotton and corn clear of crabgrass and other weeds. In the twenty-first century it is an endangered breed.

The United States reports no breed of goose to the DAD-IS database of the Food and Agriculture Organization of the United Nations. The Cotton Patch is not among the breeds of goose recognised by the American Poultry Association, nor is it recognised by the Entente Européenne d'Aviculture et de Cuniculture or the Poultry Club of Great Britain.

Its conservation status was listed as 'critical' by the Society for the Preservation of Poultry Antiquities in 2025, and as 'threatened' – the second of its three levels of concern – by the Livestock Conservancy in 2026. It is included in the Ark of Taste of the international Slow Food Foundation.

== Characteristics ==
The Cotton Patch is broadly similar to the European Norman, Pilgrim, Shetland and West of England, which are also auto-sexing breeds; it may share common ancestry with them.

It is a small goose, with body weights in the range 3.5–4.5 kg (8–10 lb) for geese and 4.5–5.5 kg (10–12 lb) for ganders. The gander is white, either with or without some dove grey feathers, while the goose is either brownish grey or dove grey, with some white markings. The beak and legs are orange or orange-pink; the eyes are blue.

== Use ==
The geese were formerly used in large numbers to clear weeds from fields of crops such as cotton and corn; they also provided eggs, meat, goose-fat, feathers and down. Geese may lay as many as 90 large white eggs in a year, usually in a clutch of between 4 and 7.
