= Öland goose =

Breed of goose

Öland
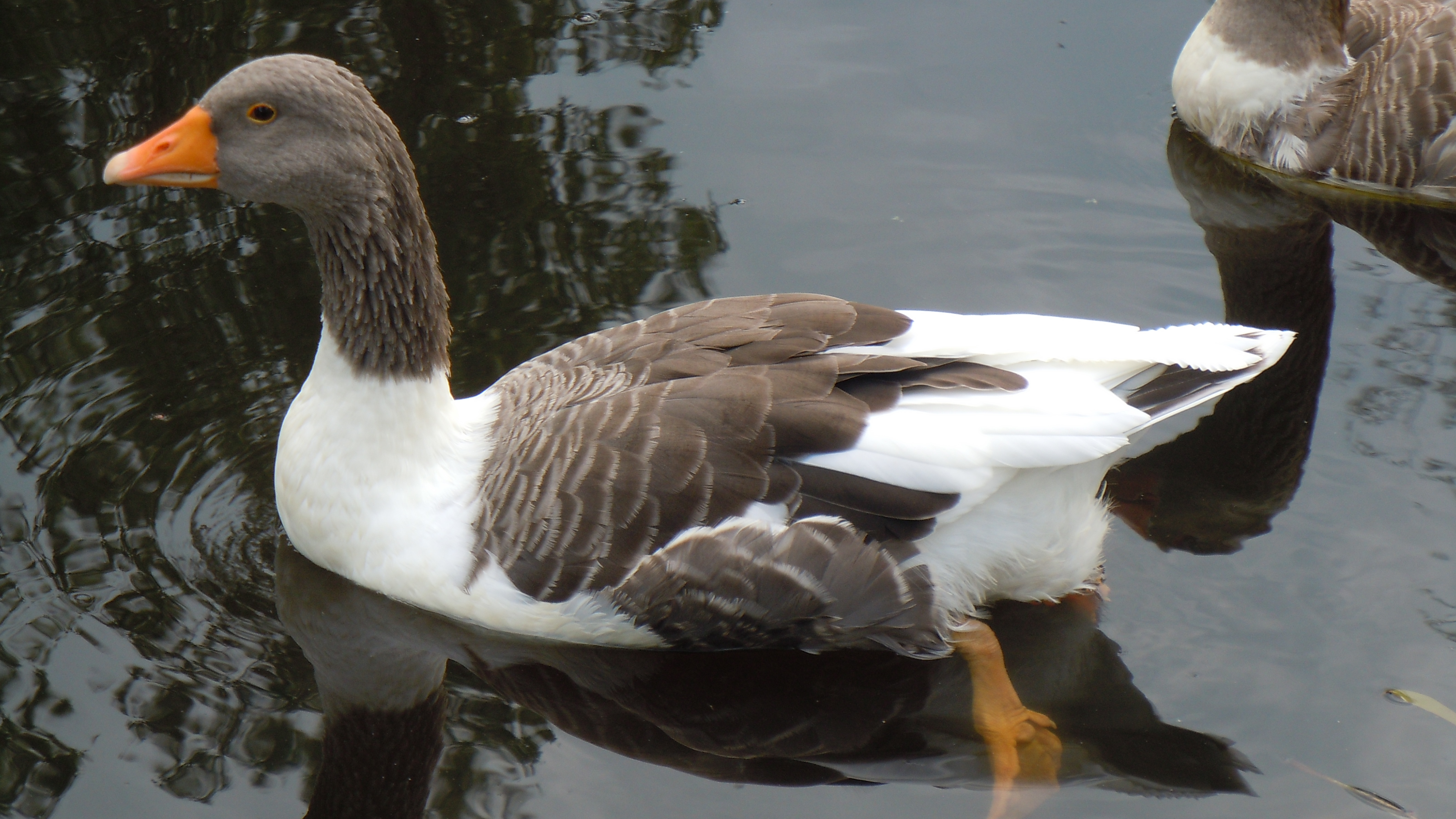
- Conservation status: FAO (2007): critical-endangered; DAD-IS (2024): at risk/critical
- Other names: Swedish: Ölandsgås
- Country of origin: Sweden
- Distribution: Öland; Småland; northern Skåne

Traits
- Weight: Male: 4.5–5.5 kg; Female: 4.0–5.0 kg
- Colour: pied white and brown-grey

Classification
- EE: not recognised

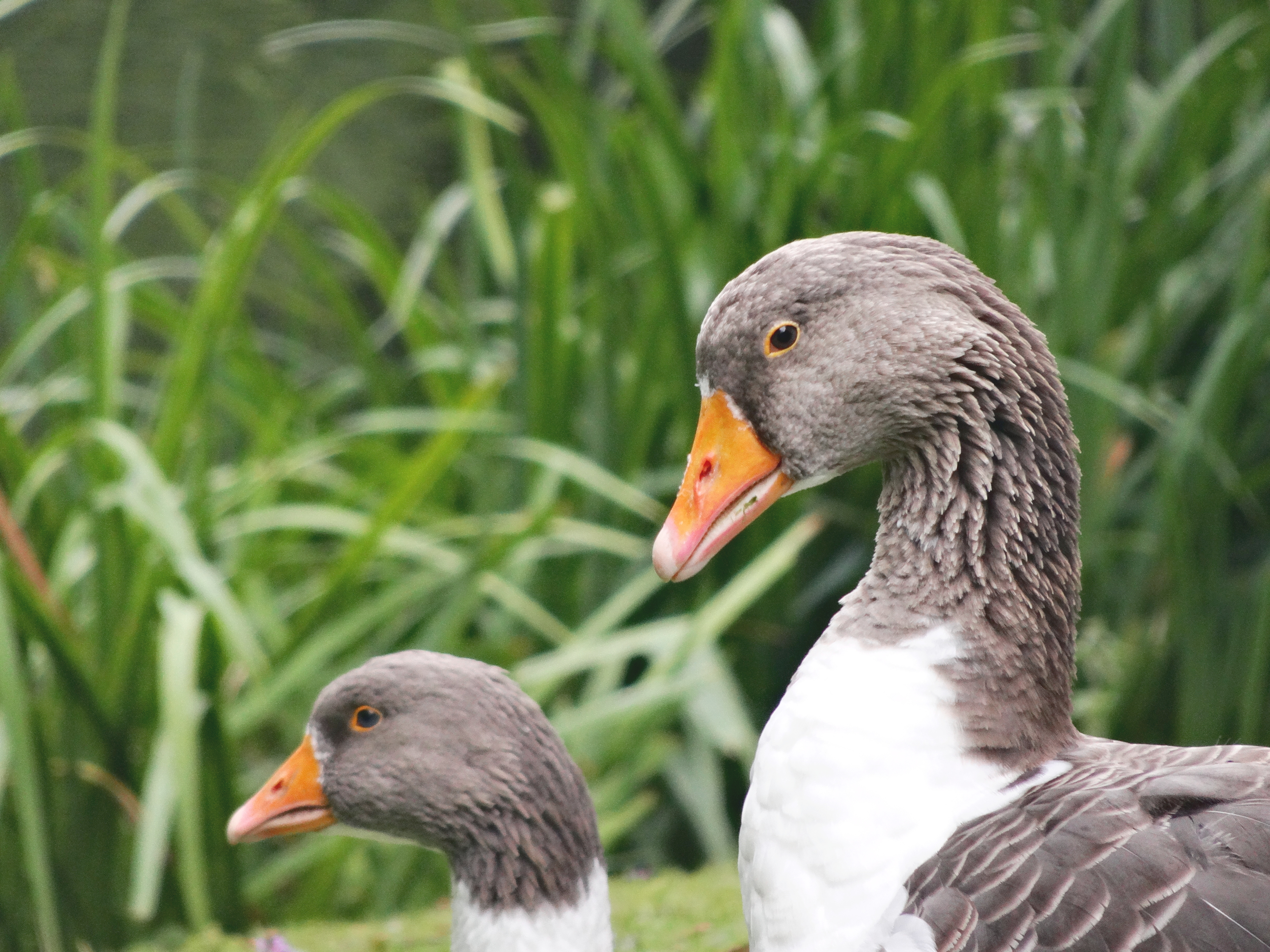
There may be some white at the base of the bill.

The Öland, Swedish: Ölandsgås, is a traditional Swedish breed of domestic goose. It is named for the island of Öland, where it is thought to have originated, and is distributed there, in Småland and in northern Skåne. It is an endangered breed, with few more than a hundred living birds.

== History ==
The Öland is a traditional breed of Öland and Götaland. It was standardised in the 1920s. The breed was nearly extinct at the 1970s.

For 2021 a total population of 105 birds is reported. The conservation status of the Öland was listed as "critical-maintained" by the Food and Agriculture Organization of the United Nations in 2007, and was listed in DAD-IS as "at risk/critical" in 2024.

== Characteristics ==
The Öland is similar in appearance to the Skåne, although slightly greyer. The plumage is pied white and brown-grey, with grey head and neck and patches of grey on the back, thighs and tail. The bill and the legs are bright orange; there may be some white round the base of the bill. Ganders generally weigh between 4.5 and 5.5 kg, geese some 4–5 kg.

== Use ==
The Ölandsgås was traditionally reared principally for meat; geese lay some 20 to 30 eggs per year. The birds are markedly territorial; ganders may be used to guard farm property.
