= Grå og Gråbrogede Danske Gås =

Danish breed of goose

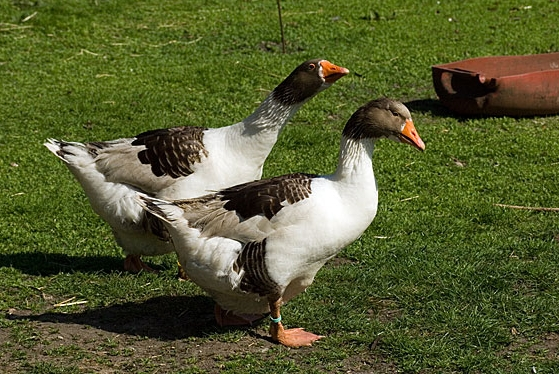
The Danish Goose. These are of the grey mottled variation.

The Grå og Gråbrogede Danske Gås or Dansk Landgås is a traditional Danish breed of domestic goose.

== History ==
The Danish goose was bred from wild animals in ancient times and is thought to have emerged from Scandinavian wild grey geese. From archaeological remains we know that the Danish goose was a popular poultry of the Vikings and was in fact the most popular poultry and only goose bred in Denmark up until the end of the 17th century, when a land reform changed the agrarian practices. Apart from the meat and eggs, the Vikings used the feathers from this goose breed as steering feathers for arrows.

At the end of the 20th century, the Danish landrace goose was on the brink of extinction, but a dedicated breeding program helped the species survive. There are still limited numbers of Danish landrace geese to this day, however, with only about 50 herds registered as of 2006. Several breeding populations can be found at open air museums, where the public can experience and interact with them.

== Description ==
The Danish goose is available in two variants, gray and gray mottled. It is a medium-sized goose, with a weight of about 6 kg when fully developed. The beak and legs of the Danish goose are a sharp orange colour and the eyes are blue. Interbreeding often results in brown eyes though. The gray mottled variant is also referred to as white, as only the head, back and inner wings are grey coloured, while the rest is brightly white. The Danish goose has only one køl below the belly. The goose is considered a hardy bird and the breeds' main productional strength is its ability to produce a low-fat carcass with a lot of meat. It is a slow growing bird however, with small clutches and a low reproduction rate. Therefore, the Danish goose has fallen out of favor in modern agricultural production.

== Use ==
The Danish goose also used to provide downs and feathers for quills. Goose is traditionally served for dinner on Mortensaften (St. Martin's Day) in Denmark.

== Sources ==
- Grå og Gråbrogede Danske Gæs/Goose (domestic)/Denmark European Farm Animal Biodiversity Information System (EFABIS)
- Hans Jacob Schou: Dansk landgås ligner den vilde grågås [Danish Landrace looks like the wild grey goose] danske-dyr.dk (in Danish)
- De danske landgæs [The Danish landrace geese] Foreningen gamle danske husdyrracer (in Danish)
