= West of England Goose =

British breed of goose

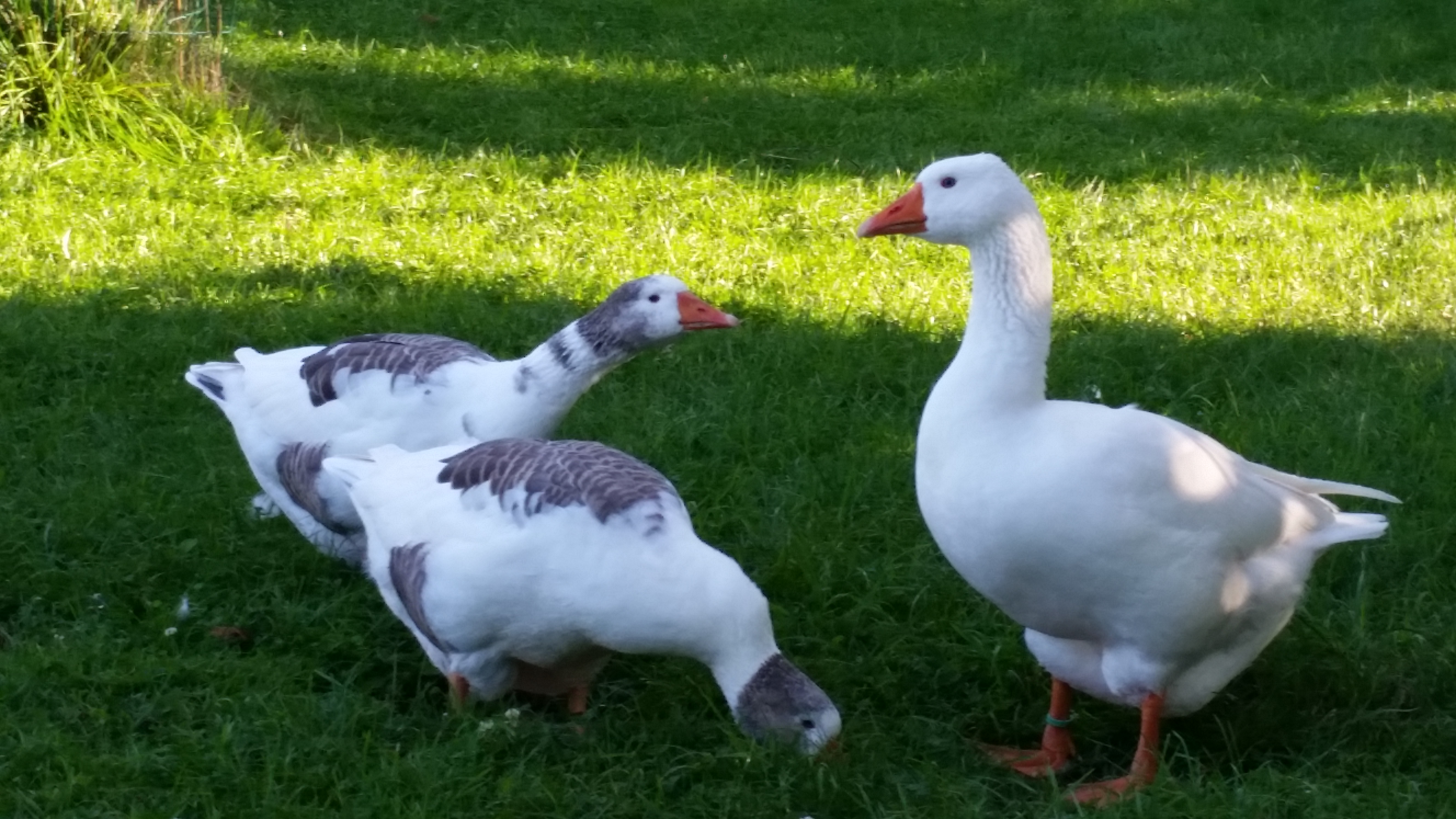
- Two female West of England on the left with a gander on the right
- Country of origin: United Kingdom
- Standard: British Waterfowl Assoc
- Use: Meat and eggs

Traits
- Weight: Gander: 16–20 lb (7.3–9.1 kg); Goose: 14–18 lb (6.4–8.2 kg)
- Colour: Gander: white; Goose: saddleback white

Classification
- Domestic goose; Anser anser domesticus

The West of England is a British breed of domestic goose. The colouration of gander and goose is quite different, so they are easily distinguished.

== History ==
The West of England is believed to be an old breed, descending from British farmyard geese of several centuries ago, although the breed was not standardised until 1999. The breed takes its name from the area of England it originated in, particularly the county of Devon. It is believed the Pilgrim goose descends from the West of England.

== Characteristics ==
The West of England is auto-sexing, ganders are completely white in colour, whilst geese a have a grey saddle across their backs and grey patches on their necks and thighs. The West of England is considered a medium sized breed of goose, ganders typically weigh between 16–20 pounds (7.3–9.1 kg), and geese between 14–18 pounds (6.4–8.2 kg). Both sexes have orange bills and blue eyes.

The West of England is considered a reasonable layer of eggs, producing between 20–30 eggs per year. They are considered a good table and exhibition bird.

== See also ==
- List of goose breeds
