= Twente goose =

Breed of goose

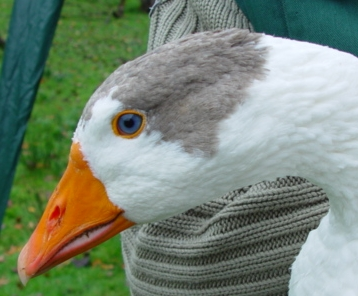
Head of a Twente goose

The Twente goose (Dutch: Twentse Landgans) is a rare breed of domestic goose from the Twente region of the Netherlands.

== History ==
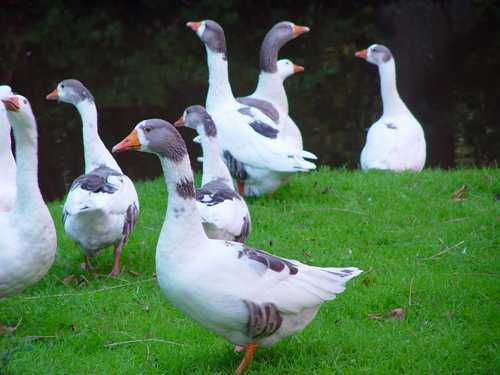
Twente goose flock

In 1900, Twente geese numbered more than 100,000; in 2011 the population was reported as 110. There are fewer than 20 breeders.

== Characteristics ==
The plumage may be either white or pied grey and white. Twente ganders usually weigh 5–6 kg (11–13 lb), and geese 4–5 kg (8.8–11.0 lb).
