= Czech goose =

Breed of goose

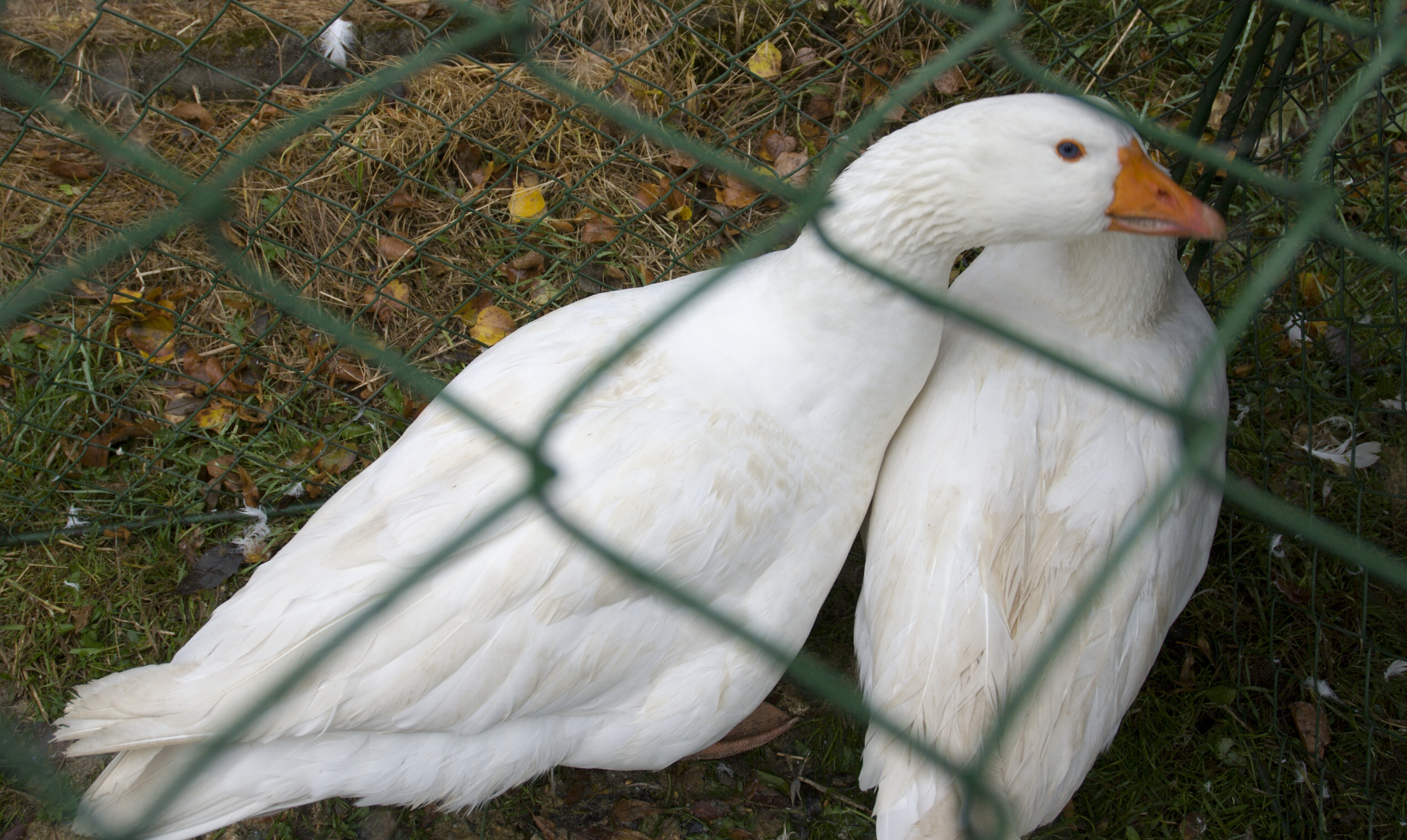
Czech geese

The Czech goose (Czech: Česká husa) is a landrace of domestic goose originating in the Czech lands.

The plumage is white only. The legs and beak are orange. The neck is short and bulky. It exists in 2 forms: with and without a crest on the head.

Ganders generally weigh 5.5-6.6 kg, and females 3.5-5.6 kg. It lays around 10-20 eggs, which weigh 120 g.

== See also ==
- List of goose breeds
