= Shetland goose =

Breed of goose

The Shetland goose is a Scottish breed of domestic geese that originates in the Shetland Islands of Scotland. Like the other breeds of livestock native to the islands, the Shetland goose is small in stature, generally weighing between 12 and 14 pounds (5 and 6 kilos). They are very hardy and exceptionally good foragers, and are able to largely sustain themselves through grazing.

== History ==
The Shetland goose has been used by crofters to graze pastures. This was done to rid the grass of parasites, such as the liver fluke, which would prepare it for grazing by sheep.

== Characteristics ==
Like a few other goose breeds, including the Pilgrim and Cotton Patch, Shetlands are sexually dimorphic at hatch (called auto-sexing in poultry nomenclature), and can be differentiated on appearance alone. Ganders have entirely white plumage, while geese have a head, neck, and upper body with gray highlights and a white underbody. They generally mate for life, and are good parents. Shetland geese lay around 30 eggs a year, that are white in colour. The Shetland goose has a shorter bill, due to its natural ability to forage.

Shetlands were first exported to United States in 1997, by a farm in New York. They are not yet recognized by the American Poultry Association via admittance in the Standard of Perfection. The breed is currently being studied by the American Livestock Breeds Conservancy, which considers populations in North America to potentially be too low to maintain sufficient genetic diversity (in North America).

== See also ==
- List of goose breeds
- Shetland animal breeds
