= Scania goose =

Breed of goose

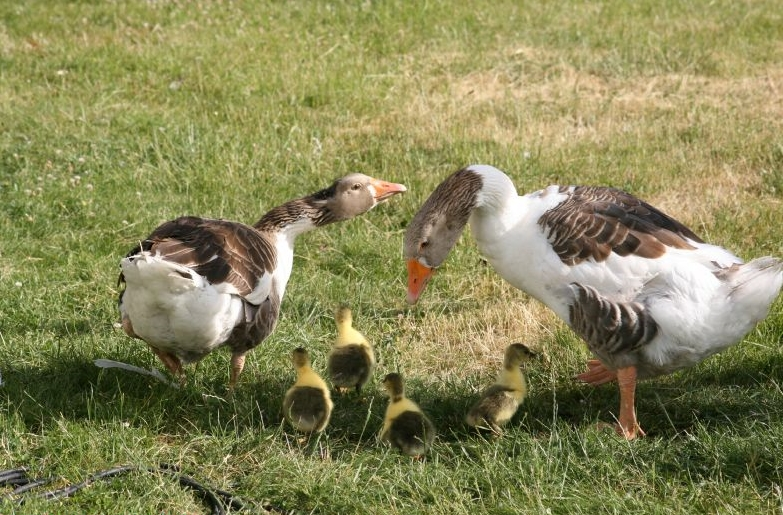
Scania geese with goslings

The Scania Goose (Swedish: Skånegås) is a breed of domestic geese originating in Scania in Sweden.

== Origin ==
The Scania goose is a landrace around the towns of Vomb and Hunneberga in Scania, in the south of Sweden. The breed was standardised in the 1920s. In 2011 there were 172 registered animals in Sweden.

== Description ==
The Scania goose is a large breed similar to the Pomeranian goose, derived ultimately from the greylag goose. The breed is hardy enough to spend the whole year out of doors in southern Sweden. The plumage is white with brown-grey head, neck, back, thighs and rump feathers. The beak and legs are orange; the beak has a flesh-coloured tip. Ganders weigh 7–11 kg, females weigh 6.5–8 kg, making it the largest and heaviest breed in Sweden. They lay around 20–30(–40) eggs and can live for over 30 years. The grey-white egg weighs 200 g. The breed is generally calm and makes good parents.

== See also ==
- List of goose breeds
