= American Buff =

American breed of goose

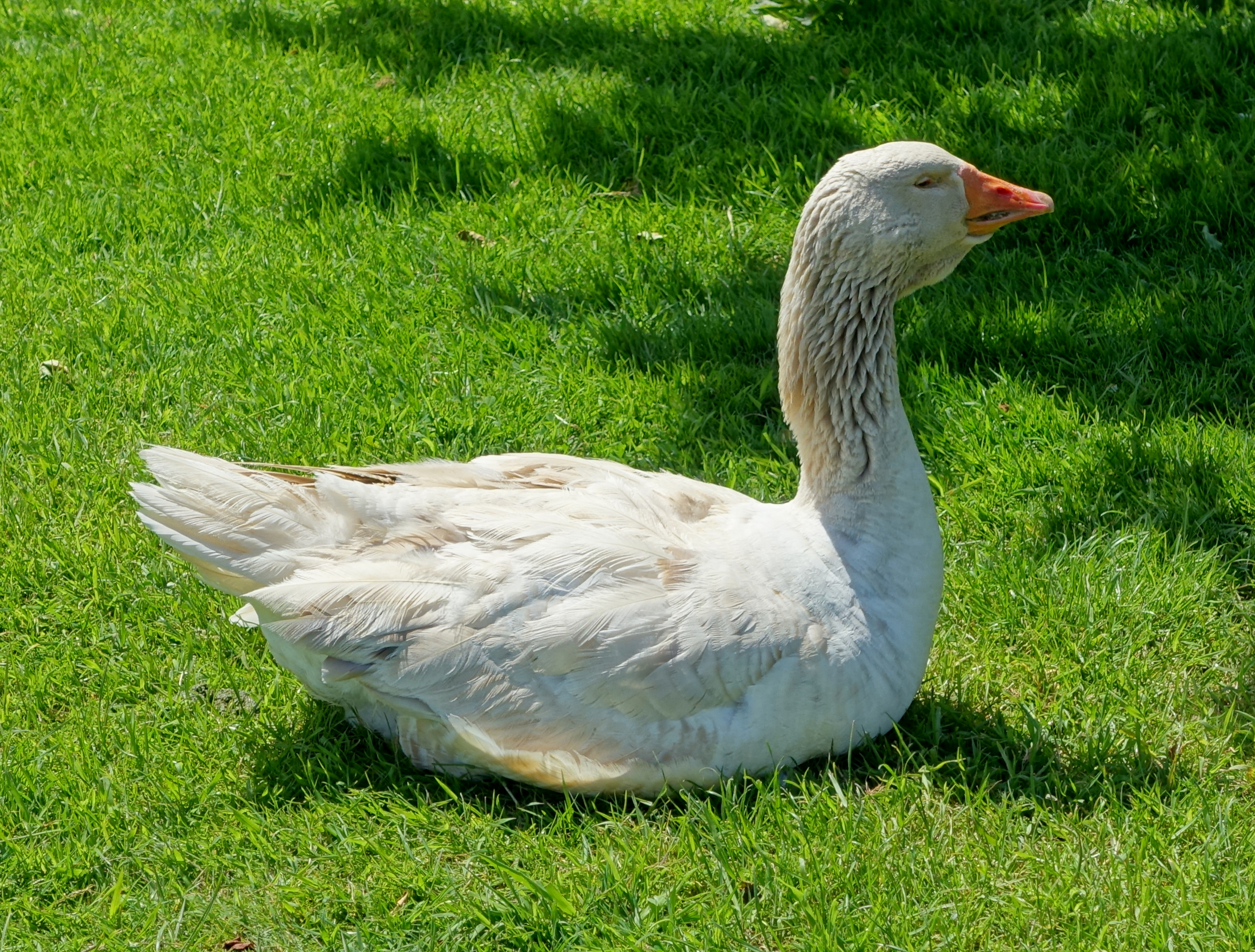
- Conservation status: FAO (2007), USA: not listed; FAO (2007), UK: critical; Livestock Conservancy (2022): watch; DAD-IS (2023), USA: not listed; DAD-IS (2023), UK: unknown
- Other names: American Buff Goose
- Country of origin: United States
- Distribution: United States; United Kingdom
- Use: meat, fancy

Traits
- Weight: Male: USA: 8 kg (18 lb); UK: 10–13 kg (22–28 lb); Female: USA: 7 kg (16 lb); UK: 9–12 kg (20–26 lb)
- Egg color: white
- Color: buff with white belly

Classification
- APA: yes
- EE: no
- PCGB: heavy
- Goose; Anser anser

The American Buff is an American breed of domestic goose. It was accepted by the American Poultry Association in 1947. It is named for its single plumage variety, which is a pale buff or apricot-fawn in color.

== History ==
Like almost all breeds of domestic goose, the American Buff derives from Anser anser, the wild Greylag goose of Europe and northern Asia. Its origins are obscure, and various theories have been put forward; it is not known if it was bred from local grey farm geese, or from existing buff geese imported from Europe. The modern breed is the result of work done in the 1930s and 1940s by a Missouri breeder named Oscar Grow. The American Buff was admitted to the Standard of Perfection of the American Poultry Association in 1947, in the 'medium' group. It was added to the British Poultry Standards of the United Kingdom in 1982; there it has become a much heavier bird, and is classed by the Poultry Club of Great Britain as a heavy breed.

It is a rare breed, and is listed as 'watch' on the conservation priority list of the Livestock Conservancy (formerly the American Livestock Breeds Conservancy). Neither it nor any other breed of goose is reported by the United States Department of Agriculture to the DAD-IS database of the Food and Agriculture Organization of the United Nations. It is listed in the Ark of Taste of the Slow Food Foundation.

== Characteristics ==
The American Buff is characterized by its pale yellow-buff plumage, sometimes described as apricot-fawn; the abdomen is white or nearly so. It differs from other buff-colored geese such as the Brecon Buff of the United Kingdom and the Celler Gans of Germany in its vivid orange beak, shanks and feet.

== Use ==
It is a dual-purpose bird, providing both meat and eggs. The meat is dark and rich. Geese lay some 10–25 large white eggs per year. They sit well, and may be used to hatch the eggs of other geese.
