= Toulouse goose =

French breed of goose

Toulouse
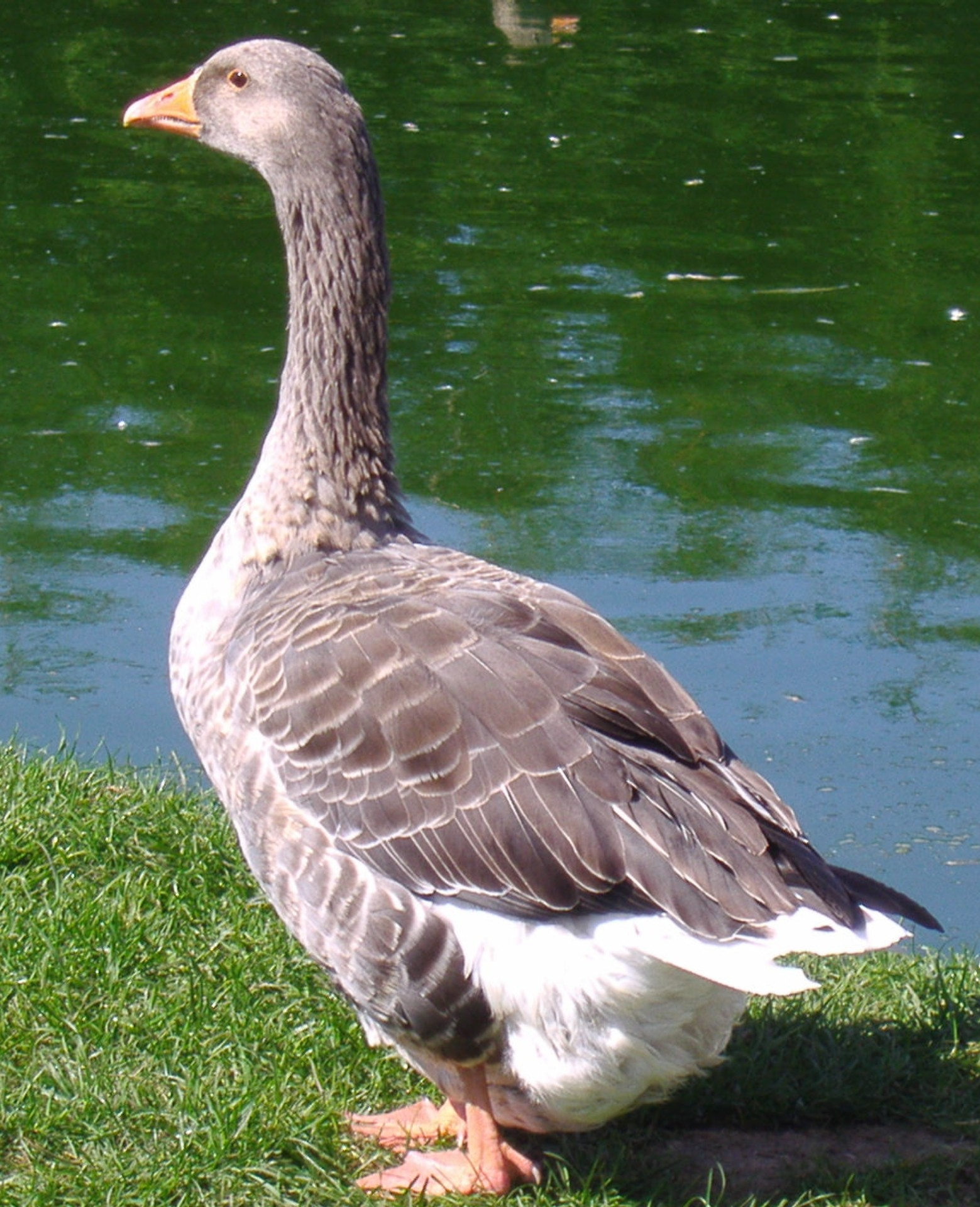
- The sans bavette type, without dewlap

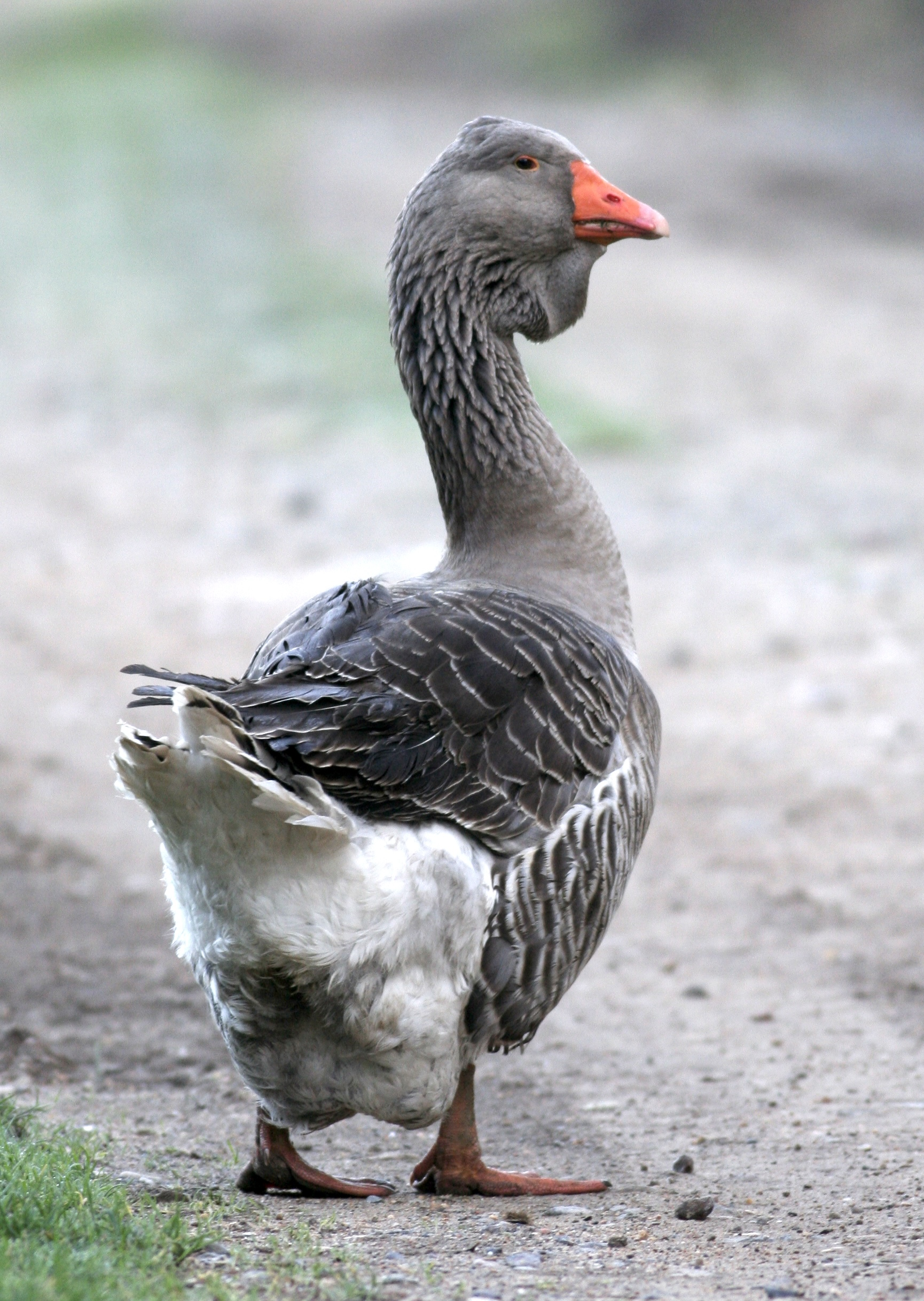
- The à bavette type, with dewlap
- Conservation status: FAO 2007: not at risk; RBST (2022): priority; DAD-IS (2025): unknown
- Other names: Oie de Toulouse à bavette; Oie de Toulouse sans bavette
- Country of origin: France
- Use: meat; foie gras; goose down; eggs

Traits
- Weight: Male: 9–9.5 kg (20–21 lb); Female: 7–8.5 kg (15–19 lb)
- Egg colour: white

Classification
- APA: heavy goose
- EE: yes
- PCGB: geese: heavy
- Goose; Anser anser

The Toulouse is a French breed of large domestic goose, originally from the area of Toulouse in south-western France. Like most other domestic geese, it derives from the wild species Anser anser.

Two types are recognised: a heavy industrial type with dewlaps, the Oie de Toulouse à bavette; and a slightly lighter agricultural type without dewlaps, the Oie de Toulouse sans bavette. Both types are large, with weights of up to 9 kg. Birds bred in the United Kingdom and United States exclusively for showing may be still larger, and have a somewhat different conformation.

== History ==
The history of the Toulouse goes back at least to 1555. It was reared for meat and for foie gras.

Some were brought to the United Kingdom in the 1840s by Edward Smith-Stanley, 13th Earl of Derby, who was at that time president of the Zoological Society of London. There it was bred for considerably greater weight; a Toulouse gander weighing over 15 kg (34 lb) took a prize at the National Poulty Show in 1894. The British breed standard dates from 1865.

Some of these heavier British birds were later exported to North America. The Toulouse was included in the first Standard of Perfection of the American Poultry Association in 1874. It is reared principally in the upper Midwest, where its good tolerance of cold weather is an advantage.

== Characteristics ==
The Toulouse generally has a placid disposition. Ring size is 27 mm for both ganders and geese. In France weights are usually in the range 7–9 kg. The British standard calls for an average weight of about 10 kg for geese, and nearly 13 kg for ganders.

== Use ==
The production strain of the Toulouse goose was bred to be fast-growing, gaining weight rapidly when there is an abundance of food and no room for exercise. It may be reared for its meat, for goose fat, or for foie gras. Exhibition strains are slow-growing. Geese of the type without dewlaps lay some 25 to 40 extra-large white eggs per year, while geese of the dewlap type lay about 20 to 35. The birds may also be a source of goose down.
