= Pomeranian goose =

Breed of goose

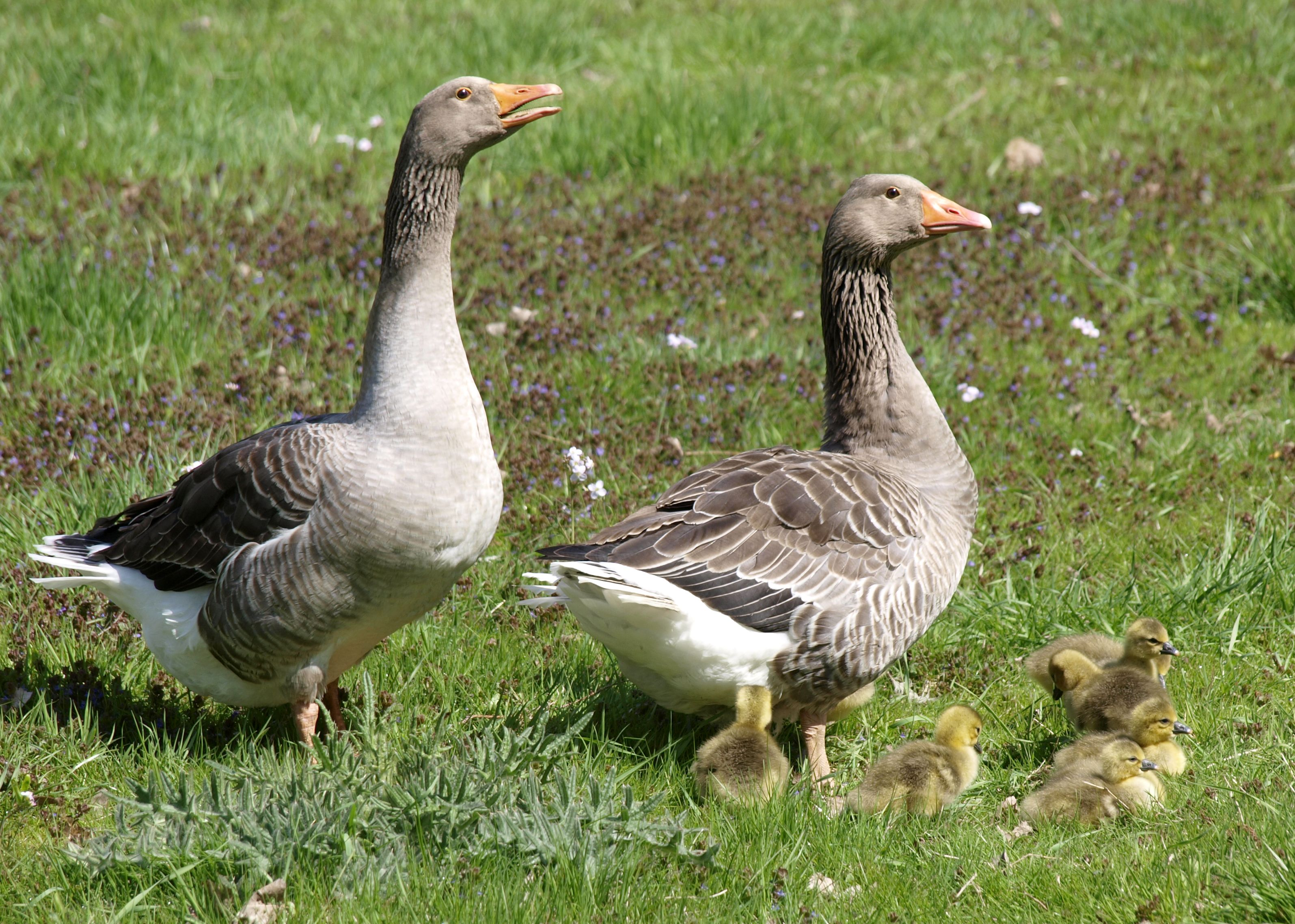
Pomeranian geese with goslings

The Pomeranian goose (German: Pommerngans, French: L'oie de Poméranie), also known as the Rügener goose, is a breed of domestic goose.

Although only an officially recognized breed since 1912, this fowl was developed by Northern German farmers of Pomerania as early as 1500. While it is popular as a market goose throughout Europe – especially in (Germany), Poland and in German and Slavic communities around the Baltic region – today "there are few breeders of the Historical Pomeranian goose."

== Description ==
The Pomeranian is the only descendant of the Greylag goose specifically bred for a single-lobed paunch. In North America, these geese often have two lobes nonetheless due to genetic variation and inbreeding.

Pomeranian Geese average 16 pounds in weight and lay about 70 eggs a season although some varieties may produce less. They have flattened heads, stout necks, prominent breasts, rounded bodies and what has been described as an "arrogant" bearing. They make good watch birds as they tend to greet visitors noisily.

Pomeranian Geese "are a good all-around breed for a colorful home flock". Breeders should look for plump birds that look heart-shaped when viewed from above. Breeders should also seek stock with good markings as these are a variable trait and breeding geese with clearly defined markings is a challenge. Pomeranian Geese usually have white feathers around the base of their bills but solid-colored heads are more preferred. A Pomeranian goose should have blue eyes, a pinkish red bill, and reddish orange legs and feet.

The indication of knobs at the base of a goose's bill is viewed negatively and is considered indicative of inbreeding. Likewise, Pomeranian Geese with such undesirable traits as dark feathers in the wings, dewlaps, excessively white heads, orange bills, orange feet, and undersized bodies should be avoided as breeding stock.

According to an expert:

This breed descended from the Eastern Graylag, which is why true Pomeranians have pinkish red beak, legs and feet. The Pomeranian is believed to have developed in the Pomorze region between the Rivers Odes and Vistula. It is an ancient breed that has stood the intrusion of foreign and modern breeds into its home turf and contributed to the development of numerous breeds and varieties, and proven itself competitive where ever tried. Today it is the dominant breed in Northern Germany, Poland, Slovakia and the Czech Republic. It is very popular in the rest of Germany and Austria and seems to be gaining elsewhere. More than thirty years ago I encountered representatives of the breed in Switzerland, the Low Countries and Britain, as well as its more typical range. Despite what Soames and other writers have said, when I was in Germany in the early 1970's I had the distinct impression it was the dominant working goose everywhere...this is a unique and ancient breed worthy of preservation.

== Varieties ==
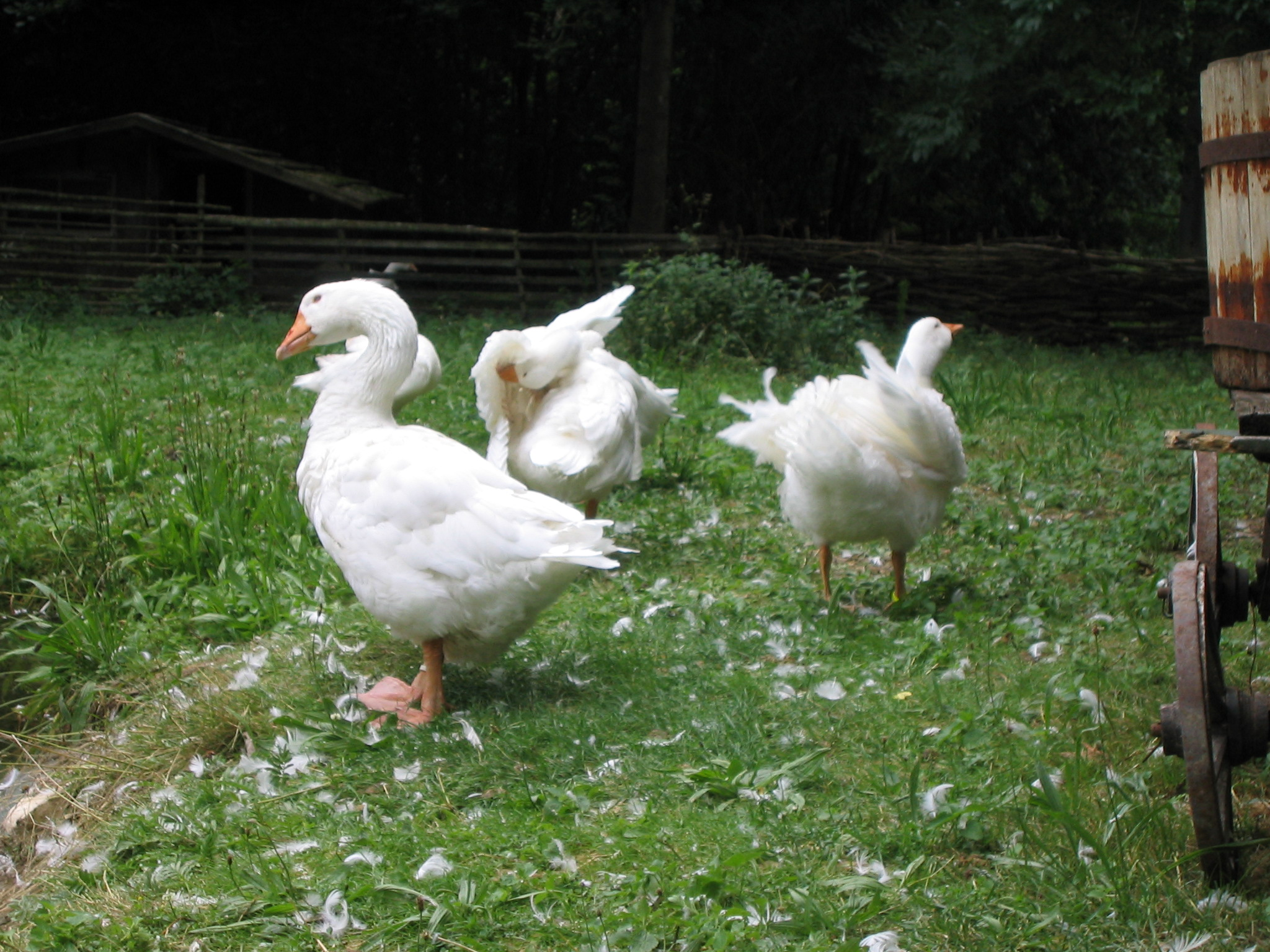
White Pomeranian geese

In their native Germany, Pomeranian geese are a "utilitarian goose breed" represented white, gray, saddleback buff, and saddleback gray varieties.

The American saddleback Pomeranian which is almost the sole representative of this breed in the United States is recognized by the American Poultry Association. Its head, back, and flanks are light gray or beige. The bird has an all-white body with the colored feathers on its tail edged in near-white. It is uncommon enough that the American Livestock Breeds Conservancy regards its status as "critical".

Pomeranian varieties and related breeds are also raised in the United Kingdom. Categorizing geese can be a complex matter as indicated by this 2004 letter in the bulletin of the Society for the Preservation of Poultry Antiquities Bulletin:

Toulouse x Embden cross is what gave us the English Greybacks and Buff Backs and the American Saddlebacks. All three of these breeds have Pomeranian blood and their standard represents that. The historical Pomeranian has been a major working goose in America, which is also the root of the confusion. Greyback, buff back, pied, spotted or saddleback refers to the pattern of plumage. These do not identify the breed of goose. Some breeds that have these markings are the British Buff Back, British Greyback, American Saddleback and the Historical Pomeranian. A saddleback goose is not necessary a Pomeranian. To avoid confusion, specific language is required to identify the separate breeds.

== See also ==
- List of goose breeds
