= Emden goose =

German breed of goose

Emden
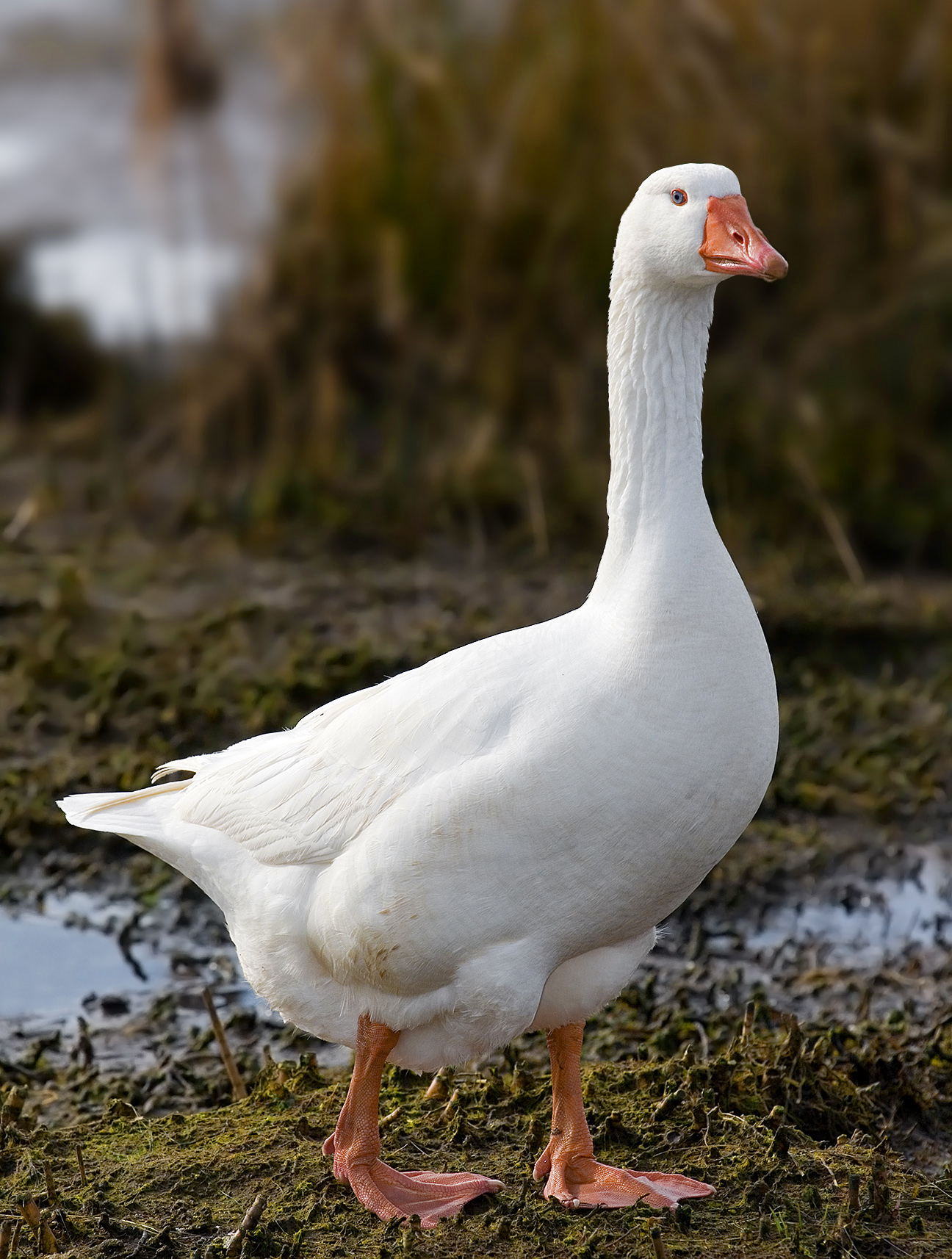

- At the Birmingham Zoo in Birmingham, Alabama
- Conservation status: FAO (2007): not at risk; TGRDEU (2025): endangered; GEH (2026): seriously endangered; DAD-IS (2026): at risk/endangered
- Other names: Embden Goose; Emder Gans; Emdener Gans
- Country of origin: Germany
- Distribution: world-wide
- Use: meat, eggs

Traits
- Weight: Male: 11–12 kg; Female: 10–11 kg
- Egg colour: white

Classification
- APA: heavy goose (1874)
- EE: yes
- PCGB: heavy

The Emden or Embden is a German breed of domestic goose. It is named for the town of Emden in north-western Germany.

== History ==
The Emden is variously described as the oldest goose breed of the area that is now Germany, with origins believed to go back to the thirteenth century, or as a relatively modern breed with no more than two hundred years of history. It derives from the traditional large white geese of the East Frisia region of Lower Saxony in north-western Germany; these had a long curved neck and so were sometimes known as the Schwanengans ('swan goose'). (Note: Not to be confused with the wild species Anser cygnoides, also known both as the German: Schwanengans and as the 'swan goose'.) The Embden was included in 1865 in the first British poultry standard, the The Standard of Excellence in Exhibition Poultry of William Bernhardt Tegetmeier, while in Germany the modern breed was established in the late nineteenth century.

In 2016 the breeding population in Germany consisted of 238 female and 132 male birds. In 2025 the conservation status of the Emdener was listed by the Bundesanstalt für Landwirtschaft und Ernährung as gefährdet ('endangered'), while on the Rote Liste of the Gesellschaft zur Erhaltung alter und gefährdeter Haustierrassen it was listed in 2026 in Category II, stark gefährdet ('seriously endangered'). In the United Kingdom it was listed by the Rare Breeds Survival Trust in 2026 as 'priority'.

== Characteristics ==
The Emden is the heaviest goose breed of Germany: ganders may weigh up to 12 kg, and reach a height of a metre. In the United Kingdom weights are considerably greater: ganders weigh from 12.5 to 15 kg and geese up to 12.5 kg. The plumage is pure white, with orange feet and shanks, and a short bill of a slightly lighter orange.

The beak

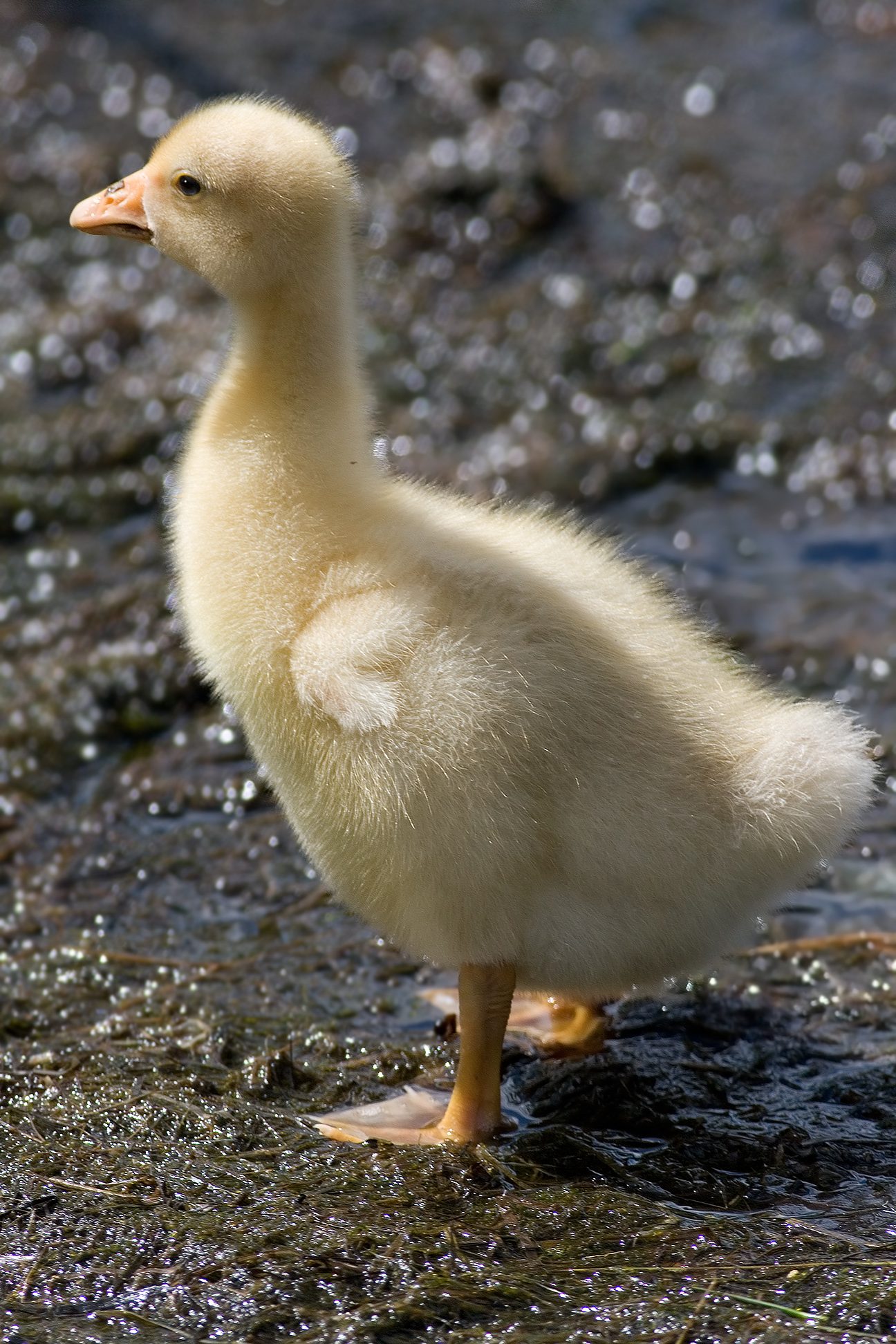
A gosling

== Use ==
The Emdener may be kept for meat or for eggs; the meat is of good quality. Geese may lay some 50–60 eggs per year, with an average weight of about 170 g.
