= Papillon =

Papillon, papillons, or le papillon may refer to:

== Animals ==
- Butterfly
- Papillon (dog), a dog breed
- Papillon (horse), a racehorse, winner of the 2000 Grand National

== Film and television ==
- Papillon, a fictional character in the anime series Busou Renkin
- Papillon (1973 film), an adaptation of Henri Charrière's book, starring Steve McQueen
- Papillon (2017 film), another adaptation of Henri Charrière's book, starring Charlie Hunnam
- Le Papillon (film) or The Butterfly, a 2002 French film starring Michel Serrault
- Papillon (TV series), a live action comedy series

== Literature ==
- Papillon (book) (1969), a memoir by Henri Charrière about his imprisonment at the Devil's Island penal colony in French Guiana
- Papillon (manga), a manga series by Ueda Miwa

== Music and dance ==
- Papillon (Hitomi Shimatani album), 2001, or the title song
- Papillon (Lara Fabian album), 2019
- Papillon, a 2015 album by the French artist Sanseverino
- Le papillon (ballet), an 1860 ballet
- Papillons, a series of piano dances by Robert Schumann

=== Songs ===
- "Papillon" (Chaka Khan song), originally recorded by Gregg Diamond as "Hot Butterfly", 1978; covered by Chaka Khan, 1980
- "Papillon" (Editors song), 2009
- "Papillon" (Hitomi Shimatani song), a Japanese-language cover of Janet Jackson's "Doesn't Really Matter", 2001
- "Papillon", by the Airborne Toxic Event from The Airborne Toxic Event, 2008
- "Papillon", by Celine Dion from S'il suffisait d'aimer, 1998
- "Papillon", by Jackson Wang, 2017
- "Papillon", by Nicole, 1982
- "Papillon", by Patrick Norman, 1974
- "Papillon", by Rilo Kiley from The Initial Friend, 1999
- "Papillon", by Rolf Harris, 1974
- "Papillon", by Stratovarius from Elements Pt. 1, 2003
- "Papillon", by Secret Garden from Songs from a Secret Garden, 1996
- "Papillon", by the Twilight Singers from Blackberry Belle, 2003
- "Papillon (On the Wings of the Butterfly)", by David Arkenstone from In the Wake of the Wind, 1991
- "Papillon", by Nmixx from Fe3O4: Forward, 2025

== Other uses ==
- Le Papillon (restaurant), a French restaurant in San Jose, California
- Papillon Hall, Lubenham, a historic house in Leicestershire, England, built in about 1620, remodelled by Edwin Lutyens in 1903, and demolished in 1950
- Papillon Records, a British record label
- Papillon (name), including a list of people with the name
- Papillon–Lefèvre syndrome, a human genetic disorder
- The 'Papillon' technique, a radiotherapy treatment for rectal cancer
- Papillon (card game), an historical French card game of the fishing family

== See also ==
- Butterfly (disambiguation)
- Papillion (disambiguation)
