= APRL =

APRL may refer to:

- American Philatelic Research Library, a public philatelic library in the United States
- Animal Protection and Rescue League, a grassroots animal rights organization based in the United States
