= Papillon (name) =

Papillon is a name meaning "butterfly" in French.

Notable people with the name include:

- Annick Papillon (born 1980), Canadian politician
- Godfrey Papillon (1867–1942), English cricketer
- Jean-François Papillon (died 1805), African-born slave in Haiti
- John Papillon (cricketer) (1806–1889), English cricketer
- John Papillon (1838–1891), British photographer and army engineer
- Thomas Papillon (1623–1702), English merchant and politician
- Papillon Soo Soo (born 1961), British-Chinese model and actress
