= Le Papillon =

Le Papillon may refer to:

- Le Papillon (ballet), an 1860 ballet by Marie Taglioni and Jacques Offenbach
- Le Papillon (film) or The Butterfly, a 2002 film by Philippe Muyl
- Le Papillon (restaurant), a French restaurant in San Jose, California
- Le Papillon des étoiles, a novel by French author Bernard Werber.
