= Le Papillon (restaurant) =

- Interactive map of Le Papillon

Restaurant information
- Established: 1977; 49 years ago
- Owner: Mike Mashayekh
- Head chef: Scott Cooper
- Food type: French
- Dress code: Business casual
- Location: 410 Saratoga Avenue, San Jose, California, 95129, United States
- Coordinates: 37°19′11″N 121°58′21″W
- Seating capacity: 65
- Reservations: Suggested
- Website: LePapillon.com

Le Papillon (the French word for butterfly, pronounced [lə papiˈjɔ̃]) is a French restaurant located in San Jose, California.

Le Papillon is located on a busy street corner between a hotel and a strip mall. Although the surrounding area is prosaic, the restaurant is "elegant (and expensive)". Customers are pampered by "many people in suits". Le Papillon specializes in contemporary French cuisine.

Owner Mike Mashayekh opened Le Papillon in 1977 in a remodeled coffee shop at its current location. Mashayekh was also co-owner of La Foret restaurant (another French restaurant in San Jose) with John Davoudi. Mashayekh and Davoudi were friends before they emigrated to the United States. They had been in the Iranian Army together before the overthrow of the Shah.

Before moving to San Jose, Mashayekh had lived in Santa Maria, California where he met and married the mother of Scott Cooper (Le Papillon's Executive Chef). Cooper was a young boy at the time. The family moved to San Jose so that Mashayekh could attend San Jose State University.

== Staff ==
Executive Chef Scott Cooper was born in Santa Maria, California and was 12 years old when his stepfather Mike Mashayekh opened Le Papillon. Cooper attended Leland High School in San Jose. Cooper joined Le Papillon's staff in 1992. He started as a dishwasher, and moved up to bus boy, prep cook, pantry, line cook, and many other positions, before becoming the Executive Chef. He also cooked for eight years at La Foret, the sister restaurant of Le Papillon. Cooper's wife is a niece of Mashayekh's partner John Davoudi. Cooper is an avid exerciser who runs and mountain bikes.

Brian Fernando is Sous Chef.

Camron Mashayekh (Mike Mashayekh's son) is Le Papillon's General manager and Sommelier.

Jondel Goldsmith is in charge of Catering and Special Events.

Omid Najian is Assistant Catering Director.

== Ratings ==
Zagat Survey, in its San Francisco Bay Area Restaurants 2010, rated Le Papillon 27/30 for food, 23/30 for decor, and 27/30 for service. Zagat interprets these ratings as "extraordinary to perfection" for food and service, and "very good to excellent" for decor. Also, Zagat found Le Papillon to be one of the top two restaurants in the South Bay Area for service.

The 2005 Zagat Survey ranked Le Papillon as one of the Bay Area's top five restaurants, giving it the highest marks for any Bay Area restaurant south of San Francisco.

== Foie gras protests in 2010 ==
Animal activists conducted weekly street demonstrations at Le Papillon from April 3, 2010 to October 23, 2010, protesting the serving of foie gras by the restaurant. The weekly protest was conducted by Santa Clara County Activists for Animals (SCCAA), a local group of animal-protection advocates. The protesters held signs and spoke to restaurant customers, offering them literature and asking them to ask the restaurant to stop serving foie gras. The protesters expressed the view that the method of foie gras production, including the force-feeding of ducks, is cruel and inhumane.

The protests ended when the restaurant removed foie gras from their menu and informed SCCAA that they would no longer serve it.

A California law (SB 1520) enacted in 2004 prohibits the production and sale of foie gras in California, but the law didn't go into effect until July 1, 2012.

== See also ==
- Foie gras controversy
- West San Jose
