= Foie gras controversy =

Controversy related to animal welfare

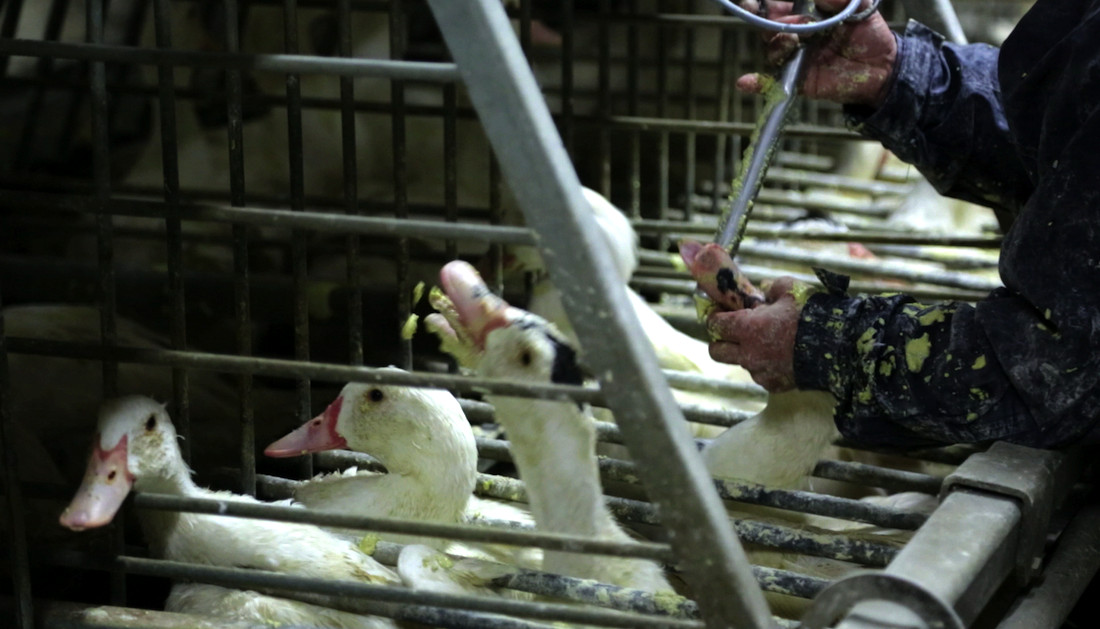
Gavage feeding

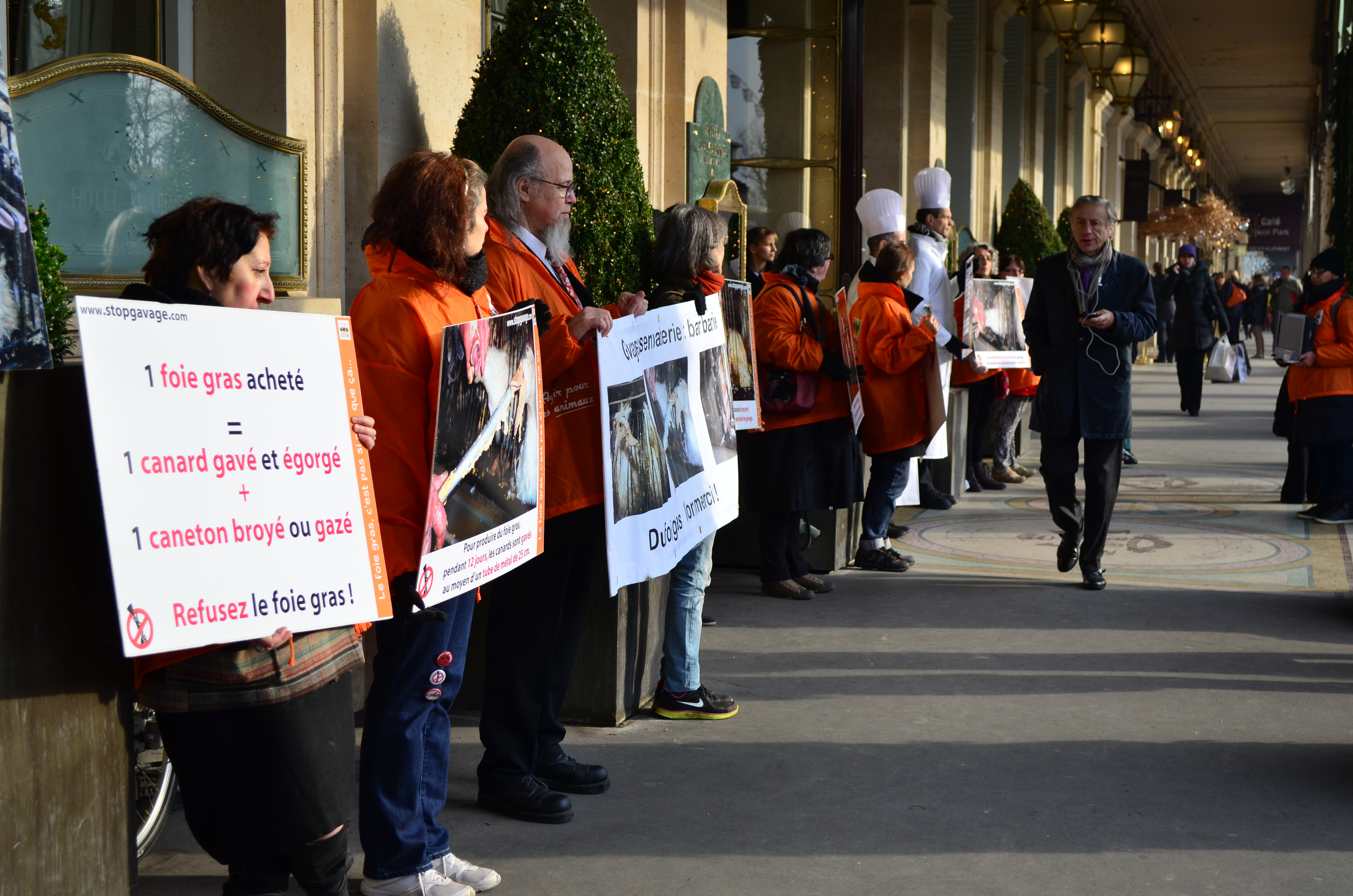
Anti-foie gras protestors at the Hôtel Meurice, Paris

The production of foie gras (the liver of a duck or a goose that has been specially fattened) involves the force-feeding of birds with more food than they would eat in the wild, and more than they would voluntarily eat domestically.

In modern gavage-based foie gras production, force feeding takes place 10.5–15 days or more before slaughter, depending on species (duck or goose) and production methods. The feed, usually corn boiled with fat (to facilitate ingestion), deposits large amounts of fat in the liver, thereby producing the fatty consistency sought by some gastronomes.

== Animal rights and welfare groups ==
Animal rights and welfare activist groups such as the Humane Society of the United States, the Animal Legal Defense Fund, L214 and FOUR PAWS contend that foie gras production methods, and force-feeding in particular, constitute cruel and inhumane treatment of animals. Specific complaints include livers swollen to up to ten times their normal size, impaired liver function, expansion of the abdomen making it difficult for birds to walk, death if the force feeding is continued, and scarring of the esophagus.

In 2001, the Director of the New York State Government Affairs & Public Policy Dept. for the American Society for the Prevention of Cruelty to Animals, which is one of America's leading environmental activist groups, wrote a letter to then NYS Attorney General, Eliot Spitzer, asking that the state's foie gras producers be prosecuted for violating animal cruelty statutes.

Late in 2003, the French group Stopgavage ("Citizens' Initiative for the banning of force-feeding") published the Proclamation for the Abolition of Force Feeding, which asks justices to find foie gras production practices a violation of existing animal welfare laws. For this manifesto Stopgavage claims the support of over eighty French animal rights and welfare associations, over a hundred such associations from 25 other countries, and over 20 thousand individual signatories.

Stopgavage, through its president Antoine Comiti, has criticized the INRA (a French public research institute) for allowing its researchers to receive grants from the foie gras industry for conducting research aimed at contradicting the EU report conclusions. Robert Dantzer, a retired INRA researcher, calls the INRA studies "pseudoscience" and "convenience research".

In 2005, the Animal Protection and Rescue League (APRL), In Defense of Animals (IDA) and People for the Ethical Treatment of Animals (PETA) jointly released a video narrated by Sir Roger Moore showing footage the groups took inside the three U.S. foie gras farms and several in France.

PETA wants this practice, which it says is cruel, stopped. Various American celebrities have lent their voices to this public campaign. Most recently in April 2009 PETA released a letter written by television and stage actor Bea Arthur to TV chef Curtis Stone deploring the practice of foie gras.

In 2014 Compassion in World Farming partners with other organizations such as the German Albert-Schweitzer Foundation and the French organization L214 to pressure the EU Commission and EU Agriculture Council to take action against the production of foie gras.

== EU Scientific Committee on Animal Health and Welfare report (1998) ==
The report of the European Union's Scientific Committee on Animal Health and Animal Welfare, Welfare Aspects of the Production of Foie Gras in Ducks and Geese, adopted on December 16, 1998, is an 89-page review of studies from several producing countries. It examines several indicators of animal welfare, including physiological indicators, liver pathology, and mortality rate.

The committee concluded that "the management and housing of the birds used for producing foie gras have a negative impact on their welfare." Its overall conclusion was that "force feeding, as currently practised, is detrimental to the welfare of the birds."

The report noted a lack of scientific literature concerning injuries resulting from force feeding and liver hypertrophy, so it relied on biochemical and histological measurements, general aspects of health, and mortality. It observed that birds with expanded livers had difficulty standing and their ability to walk was severely impaired. The report explained that the "widespread use of small cages in which the birds usually cannot stand in a normal standing position makes it difficult to recognise leg problems and leg pain." It further stated that hypertrophied livers cause discomfort in a variety of other species.

The report explained that birds have a wide range of pain receptors and an elaborate pain recognition system, with a particularly sensitive oropharyngeal area.

On physiology, the report finds that based on studies available, "no definite conclusions can be drawn concerning the physiological activity of birds in response to force feeding" because although "force feeding induced hepatic steatosis in the duck or goose", "hepatic steatosis in the waterfowl is a normal metabolic response" and there was a low incidence of lesions. If gavage is stopped the "return to normal took approximately four weeks". As an economic indicator the report states "it is strongly in the interest of the farmer" to avoid disease as the "resulting fat liver is of no commercial value". It summarizes that "some pathologists consider this level of steatosis to be pathological but others do not" and recommends that research "should be carried out into methods of producing fat liver which do not require the use of force feeding".

The EU report notes that continued force feeding leads to early death of the animal, and the birds are typically slaughtered just at the point that mortality would drastically increase from the force feeding. In the studies it examined, "the mortality rate in force fed birds varies from 2% to 4% in the two week force feeding period compared with around 0.2% in comparable ducks".

On the force-feeding process, the EU committee examined several experiments carried out by INRA (Institut National de la Recherche Agronomique) to detect pain or distress by looking at blood hormones, and found that no definite conclusions can be drawn from these studies. Other studies looked at behavioral aversion to the feeding process and found that force fed ducks avoided the feeding pen when given a choice, whereas a majority of the control group not being force fed would enter the feeding pen voluntarily. Daily hand-feeding of ducks and geese is normally associated with a positive response by the animals towards the person feeding them; in contrast, the working group observed that ducks and geese in a pen kept away from their force feeder when he entered the room. Members of the committee observed and described how geese and ducks show "avoidance behaviour indicating aversion for the person who feeds them and the feeding procedure," but the committee noted a lack of conclusive scientific evidence on the aversion. In an unpublished pilot experiment by INRA, ducks in cages reportedly displayed less avoidance behaviour to the force feeder's visit than to the visit of a neutral person coming along the cages later. However, in the working group's own observations, "Ducks in cages had little opportunity to show avoidance but sometimes moved their heads away from the person who was about to force feed them."

The report also recommends collection of additional data regarding the health of the animals, feeding methods, animal housing, and socio-economic factors.

== EU Panel on Animal Health and Animal Welfare report on farmed birds' welfare (2023) ==
In 2023, a new report titled "Welfare of ducks, geese and quail on farm" was published by the Panel on Animal Health and Animal Welfare (AHAW Panel) of the European Food Safety Authority (EFSA) to serve as guidance for the EU animal welfare law revision. The report evaluated the most common husbandry systems (HS) in the European Union for Muscovy ducks, Mule ducks, and Domestic geese used for foie gras production, among other birds. The practice of force-feeding itself was not evaluated in this report, which focused largely on restriction of movement, various injuries, group stress, inability to perform comfort behaviors, inability to perform exploratory or foraging behaviors, and inability to express maternal behaviors.

During the overfeeding phase of foie gras production, Mule ducks and Domestic geese are typically kept in indoor pen systems. The cages and pens currently in use during the force-feeding phase are typically 2-3 times too small for the birds to exhibit their natural behaviours. Moreover, extra space on open water should be provided to guarantee good welfare conditions.

== American Veterinary Medical Association (2004–2005) ==
In 2004 and 2005, the American Veterinary Medical Association(AVMA) House of Delegates, the US accrediting body of veterinary medicine, was forwarded resolutions from its Animal Welfare Committee to oppose the production methods for foie gras. After hearing testimony from 13 delegates, the HOD declined to take a position and left a simple statement: "Limited peer-reviewed, scientific information is available dealing with the animal welfare concerns associated with foie gras production, but the observations and practical experience shared by HOD members indicate a minimum of adverse effects on the birds involved."

The HOD sent delegates to visit foie gras farms. One delegate, Robert P. Gordon of New Jersey, indicated his personal position changed drastically after the visit. He also testified tube feeding is less distressing than taking the rectal temperature of a cat and urged the AVMA to take a position based on science, not emotion, while cautioning against anthropomorphism. The New York delegation offered their opinion that opponents of foie gras were intending to create a wedge issue; that the arguments used against foie gras would be modified to be used against other livestock production. The testimony of the delegate from the Association of Avian Veterinarians was that medicating and feeding sick birds via tube was a normal practice that birds accepted without stress. Another delegate who toured the farms stated that the birds appeared to be well cared for and better off than other poultry raised in factory farming. The overall position of the House of Delegates was that "observations and practical experience shared by HOD members indicate a minimum of adverse effects on the birds involved." The closing comments in the HOD were that the AVMA should be taking positions on facts and science, make broad policy positions on general animal welfare, and support positions that created oversight of controversial practices for fear that prohibition would cause production to move to countries without animal welfare regulation.

Critics of the AVMA have stated that the organization tends to defend the economic interests of agribusiness over animal welfare, and that it has also declined to take a position against other controversial practices such as forced molting and gestation crates.

== Third-party opinions on U.S.-produced foie gras (2005–2009) ==
In June 2005, New York Times editor Lawrence Downes was invited to a visit of the same farm, including specifically the gavage process, and he "saw no pain or panic...The birds submitted matter-of-factly to a 15-inch tube inserted down the throat for about three seconds, delivering about a cup of corn pellets. The practice...seemed neither particularly gentle nor particularly rough."

Dr. Ward Stone, wildlife pathologist with the NYSDEC and adjunct professor at SUNY has on several occasions conducted post-mortems on ducks that died from force feeding, including from the same farm a few months after Downes' visit. In September 2005, he writes: "the short tortured lives of ducks raised for foie gras is well outside the norm of farm practice. Having seen the pathology that occurs from foie gras production, I strongly recommend that this practice be outlawed."

In 2005, the delegates from New Jersey and Vermont of the American Veterinary Medical Association (AVMA) gave testimony to the organization after touring tube-feeding farms. Dr. Robert Gordon had visited a farm in New York on July 5. He noted, "After being on the premises, my position changed dramatically. I did not see animals I would consider distressed, and I didn't see pain and suffering." As written at AVMA news, Dr. Thomas Munschauer visited a New York farm at the request of "both sides". "I didn't see exploding esophaguses ... and it didn't seem like the birds were distressed. For the most part, they appear to be well-cared-for. That's what I saw."

In January 2009, The National Advertising Division (NAD) of the Council of the Better Business Bureau recommended that New Jersey–based foie gras producer D'Artagnan cease advertising claims that their product is made from "enlarged" rather than "diseased" livers, and that the animals were "hand-raised with tender care". D'Artagnan voluntarily modified their advertising to remove the claims which the agency said had not been "adequately substantiated".

== Foie gras producers and industry groups (1998–2007) ==
Most foie gras producers do not consider their methods cruel, insisting that it is a natural process exploiting the animals' natural features. Producers argue that wild ducks and geese naturally ingest large amounts of whole food and gain weight before migration. They claim that geese and ducks do not have a gag reflex in their throats the same way that humans do, and therefore do not appear to find force feeding uncomfortable. Michael Ginor, owner of Hudson Valley Foie Gras, author of Foie Gras... A Passion (1998), claims his birds come to him to be fed and says this is important because "a stressed or hurt bird won't eat and digest well or produce a foie gras."

Mirepoix USA, a top provider of goose and duck foie gras, alleges that the animal rights activists attack is a form of prohibition against a cuisine item. Mirepoix claims that the use of the term "diseased" to refer to fatted liver is inaccurate and that geese and ducks naturally store dead fish in their esophagi for long periods. The ducks used in foie gras production, however, are a hybrid of Pekin (a type of Mallard) and Muscovy ducks, both of which are dabbling ducks and as such, subsist mainly on a diet of underwater vegetation, larvae, and various insects.

== Chefs ==
Chef Anthony Bourdain and chef/writer Michael Ruhlman have both opposed proposed bans on foie gras, and stated that although the videos showing traditional foie gras production are disturbing and cruel, no reputable chef would buy such product. However, other celebrity chefs, such as Wolfgang Puck and Albert Roux, are against the use of foie gras. Roux has argued that foie gras should come with a warning so that "people know what's being done to the animals." He states that "More humane methods should be used that allow the animal to gorge themselves naturally." Chicago chef Charlie Trotter maintained that the production of foie gras is "too cruel to be served".

Food writer and chef J. Kenji López-Alt, after touring production at La Belle Farm in the Hudson Valley, has argued that the anatomy of waterfowl mitigates much of the perceived cruelty of gavage (tube feeding). López-Alt notes that ducks and geese lack a gag reflex and possess a trachea that runs from the lungs and out the end of the tongue, which allows them to breathe indefinitely even while a feeding tube is inserted. In a 2015 article addressing foie gras within the broader context of animal welfare debates, López-Alt characterized the specific outrage directed at foie gras as "inherently flawed". He argues that the living conditions of ducks raised on specialized foie gras farms in the United States are typically free-range, comparing favorably to conditions endured by standard commercial chickens at battery farms.

== Litigation (1985–2013) ==
The controversy over foie gras has been the subject of several lawsuits. The 1985 case Lovenheim v. Iroquois Brands was a shareholder suit regarding ethical concerns about a company selling foie gras.

In 2003, the Animal Protection and Rescue League and In Defense of Animals filed suit against Sonoma Foie Gras in California under the state's unfair business practices law, alleging animal cruelty. The farm also sued the two groups and four activists who documented conditions at the farm for trespass. The Legislature then intervened with a law allowing the farm to continue force feeding until the year 2012, after which point both the sale and production of foie gras has been illegal in California.

In 2006, Sonoma Foie Gras sued Whole Foods Market for intentional interference with contract for influencing Grimaud Farms to stop supplying ducklings and marketing for Sonoma. The suit was settled for an undisclosed amount, though the jury returned a judgement of $5.2 million.

Also pending is a 2006 lawsuit filed by the Humane Society of the United States against the New York Department of Agriculture and Markets, alleging that foie gras qualifies as an adulterated food that should not be sold.

In 2011, the Animal Legal Defense Fund filed a legal petition with the U.S. Department of Agriculture (USDA), urging that foie gras bear a consumer warning label stating "NOTICE: Foie gras products are derived from diseased birds." ALDF argues that because the USDA is responsible for ensuring that poultry products are wholesome and for approving only products from healthy animals, stamping foie gras products with the USDA seal without disclosing that those products are derived from diseased birds misleads consumers, contravening the Poultry Products Inspection Act. Regularly eating foie gras can harm the health of predisposed people. Patients with Alzheimer's, rheumatoid arthritis, type 2 diabetes and other amyloid-related diseases should not eat it.

In 2012, the Animal Legal Defense Fund sued Hudson Valley Foie Gras over its advertising as "the humane choice" for foie gras. Hudson Valley settled the case and dropped this advertising campaign after a federal judge in California indicated that he would allow the parties to present evidence and decide whether Hudson Valley could prove that its "humane" claims were truthful.

In February 2013, the Animal Legal Defense Fund filed an appeal in a lawsuit against the New York Department of Agriculture and Markets for allowing the ongoing sale of foie gras. The original lawsuit, which was dismissed in February for lack of standing, alleges that the Department violates its own Agriculture and Markets Law by allowing the sale of foie gras. New York's state law requires the Department to declare "the product of a diseased animal" an adulterated product. In the appeal, the Animal Legal Defense Fund will defend its legal standing to bring the case, noting it has diverted substantial resources to warn the public of the dangerous health risks posed by foie gras and, will assert that the Department's failure to regulate has resulted in the slaughter of hundreds of thousands of diseased birds whose organs are distributed into the human food supply.

== Statutory and voluntary bans ==
World laws on foie gras production: Countries and regions that ban foie gras production / Main foie gras-producing countries and regions

=== India ===
In July 2014, India banned the import of foie gras. The managing director of the Humane Society International of India called this "a triumph for animal welfare in India as well as across the globe", and said that it "sets a precedent for other countries to follow".

=== Australia ===
In Australia, the production of foie gras is forbidden, though it is legal to import it.

=== Argentina ===
In August 2003, Argentina banned foie gras production as it is considered a mistreatment or an act of cruelty to animals.

=== Brazil ===
In June 2015, the production and sale of foie gras was banned in São Paulo restaurants. In February 2016, the law was overturned.

On April 28, 2026, the Brazilian National Congress approved Bill 90/20, banning the production and sale of food products derived from the force-feeding of animals, including foie gras. The bill was signed into law by President Luiz Inácio Lula da Silva on July 24 and published in the official gazette.

=== Europe ===
Since 1997, the number of European countries producing foie gras has halved. As of 2016, only five European countries still produce foie gras: Belgium, Bulgaria, France, Hungary and Spain.

Foie gras production is banned in several countries, including most Austrian provinces, the Czech Republic, Denmark, Finland, Germany, Italy, Luxembourg, Norway, Poland, Turkey, and the United Kingdom.

The force feeding of animals for non-medical purposes, essential to current foie gras production practices, is explicitly prohibited by specific laws in Austria, Croatia, the Czech Republic, Denmark, Finland, Germany, Italy, Luxembourg, Norway, Poland, or following interpretation of general animal protection laws in Ireland, the Netherlands, Sweden, Switzerland, Turkey, and the United Kingdom. However, foie gras can still be imported into and purchased in these countries. Most of these countries do not currently produce foie gras, nor have they in the past. Thus, these bans have stopped foie gras production in very few countries. In 2021, the UK planned to become the first European nation to extend its ban on production to imports but this did not materialise before the Conservative government lost the 2024 General Election. The Labour Party pledged in the run-up to the 2024 General Election to implement the ban but dropped this pledge, citing the impact it would have on U.K.-E.U relations.

In France, the fattening is achieved through gavage (force-feeding corn), according to French law. French law states that "Foie gras belongs to the protected cultural and gastronomical heritage of France."

In 2012, eight members of the European Parliament called for foie gras to be banned across the EU.

"Until new scientific evidence on alternative methods and their welfare aspects is available", the production of foie gras is prohibited by treaty except for "where it is current practice" among 35 countries bound by the Council of Europe's European Convention for the Protection of Animals kept for Farming Purposes.

In 2023 foie gras production was banned in the Flemish Region of Belgium.

=== Israel ===
In August 2003, the Supreme Court of Israel ordered the Israeli Ministry of Agriculture to ban the force feeding of geese, effective 31 March 2005. The last appeal was withdrawn in October 2005, but the law was left unenforced until February 2006. Most protest activities were conducted by Animals Now, which also tracks the enforcement of the ban, and files complaints against farms that conduct illegal force feeding. In May 2013, a bill proposed by Knesset Member Dov Lipman plans to prohibit all sales of the delicacy due to the controversial methods.

=== United States ===
==== California ====
Sections 25980-25984 of the California Health and Safety Code, enacted in 2004 and effective from July 1, 2012, prohibits "force feed[ing] a bird for the purpose of enlarging the bird's liver beyond normal size" and the sale of products that are a result of this process. On January 7, 2015, Judge Stephen V. Wilson held that the California law was preempted by the federal Poultry Products Inspection Act, and enjoined the California Attorney General from enforcing it. The case was appealed to the Ninth Circuit and on September 15, 2017, the District Court's ruling was reversed and law was upheld.

San Diego: On January 8, 2008, the San Diego City Council unanimously passed a resolution that "commends the Animal Protection and Rescue League (APRL) for raising awareness of the cruel practice of force-feeding ducks and geese to produce foie gras, commends the many San Diego restaurants that have stopped selling foie gras before the California statewide ban goes into effect, and encourages San Diegans to avoid supporting this extreme form of animal cruelty." The resolution also cites an independent Zogby poll finding that 85% of San Diegans favor an immediate ban on foie gras.

==== Illinois ====
Chicago: On 26 April 2006, the Chicago City Council voted to ban the sale of foie gras, effective 22 August 2006. Breaches of the ban were punishable with fines of $250–500. Alderman Joe Moore, who proposed the ban, described the method by which foie gras is produced as "clearly animal cruelty".

In response, several Chicago chefs filed suit and deliberately violated the law by continuing to sell foie gras. Furthermore, a handful of chefs served foie gras without charge, which they considered not to be against the law. Even for establishments that were violating the law, the City issued warning letters but, until February 17, 2007, no citations were given. On that date, Doug Sohn, owner of a gourmet hot dog shop was charged with a violation. Although the fine could have been as high as $500, Sohn agreed to pay a $250 fine on March 29. Several unusual dishes, including foie gras pizza, have been created in Chicago, in defiance of the City Council's banning of foie gras. 46,000 pounds of foie gras were sold in Chicago in 2006.

In December 2006, Chicago Mayor Richard M. Daley referred to the ban as "the silliest law" the City Council has ever passed. As a result of the ban, Chicago restaurants Spiaggia and Tru developed dishes designed to simulate the foie gras experience. Chicago Tribune restaurant critic Phil Vettel found Tru's "Faux Gras" "close to the real thing", and Spiaggia's "terrina de fagato grasso vegetariano" "undeniably rich and indulgent", but "[lacking] the characteristic foie-gras intensity".

In response to Mayor Daley's objections on the foie gras ban, the City Council overwhelmingly repealed Chicago's ban on May 14, 2008.

==== New York ====
On October 30, 2019, the City Council of New York City voted to ban foie gras involving force feeding by 2022. The ban was not enforced, as it was not compatible with New York State law. However, the court ruling against New York City's foie gras ban has been overturned in 2026.

==== Washington, D.C. ====
In the 2026 District of Columbia elections, voters approved Initiative 86, which bans the force-feeding of birds and the selling of foie gras in Washington, D.C.

=== Retailer bans ===
A number of retailers have ceased the sale of foie gras produce following campaigns and protests over production methods. These include Amazon UK, Waitrose, Sainsbury's, Lidl, House of Fraser, and Harvey Nichols.

== See also ==
- Animal welfare
- California foie gras law
- Eduardo Sousa, producer of non-gavage foie gras on a small farm in Extremadura, Spain
- Factory farming
- Food and drink prohibitions
- Force-feeding of domestic animals
