= California foie gras law =

U.S. state statute banning force feeding of birds

California State Legislature
- Full name: Force Fed Birds
- Introduced: February 19, 2004
- Assembly voted: August 24, 2004
- Senate voted: May 18, 2004
- Signed into law: September 29, 2004
- Sponsor(s): John Burton
- Governor: Arnold Schwarzenegger
- Code: Health and Safety Code
- Section: 25980–25984
- Website: SB-1520 Force fed birds.(2003-2004)

Status: Current legislation

The California foie gras law or Senate Bill 1520 (S.B. 1520) is a California State statute that prohibits the "force feed[ing of] a bird for the purpose of enlarging the bird's liver beyond normal size" (California Health and Safety Code § 25981) as well as the sale of products that are a result of this process (§ 25982). This outlawed the traditional method of producing foie gras in California. The law was enacted in 2004 and went into effect on July 1, 2012. The law has been challenged repeatedly since its enactment. The ninth circuit in 2022 upheld a lower court’s 2020 ruling, which allowed residents to purchase foie gras for their individual use from out-of-state retailers.

On January 7, 2015, U.S. District Judge Stephen V. Wilson held that the portion of California's law banning the sale of foie gras within the state (California Health and Safety Code § 25982) was preempted by the federal Poultry Products Inspection Act, and enjoined the California Attorney General from enforcing it. That decision was overturned on appeal on September 15, 2017, but the decision was stayed until December 17 to permit the plaintiffs to petition the U.S. Supreme Court for certiorari. The certiorari petition was filed on March 9, 2018, and denied on January 7, 2019, leaving the lower court ruling in effect. In 2023, the Supreme Court of the United States declined to take up the case, leaving the ban in place.

== Background ==
S.B 1520 was introduced in the California Senate on February 19, 2004 by the Senate President pro tempore John Burton at the request of a coalition of animal protection organizations that included Viva!USA, Farm Sanctuary, Los Angeles Lawyers for Animals, and the Association of Veterinarians for Animal Rights.

Burton stated, "We just shouldn't be cramming a tube down a duck's throat and forcing in food to make foie gras," and that foie gras production is "an inhumane process that other countries have sensibly banned. I'm pleased California will be next on the list."

The legislature passed the bill and it was signed into law by Governor Arnold Schwarzenegger on September 29, 2004.

The law included a provision that it would take effect almost eight years after enactment in order to allow time for techniques to be developed by which foie gras could be produced without force-feeding birds. As of the date the law took effect, no such technique had been developed that was deemed commercially viable.

During the months leading up to the date when the law would go into effect, some California restaurants hosted elaborate multi-course meals featuring foie gras in many forms, drawing patrons who wanted to eat foie gras before the ban went into effect.

== Lawsuits seeking to overturn law ==
Association des Eleveurs de Canards et D'Oies du Quebec, et al v. Harris, et al.
- Court: United States Court of Appeals for the Ninth Circuit
- Full case name: Association des Eleveurs de Canards et D'Oies du Quebec, HVFG LLC; Hots Restaurant Group Inc., and Gauge Outfitters Inc. v. Kamala Harris, Attorney General; and Edmund G. Brown, Governor
- Decided: August 30, 2013
- Citation: 729 F.3d 937

Case history
- Prior action: U.S. District Court Judge Stephen V. Wilson denied a motion for preliminary injunction restraining Attorney General Harris from enforcing the California ban on foie gras

Court membership
- Judges sitting: Harry Pregerson, Raymond C. Fisher, and Wiley Y. Daniel (sitting by designation)

Case opinions
- In a unanimous opinion authored by Judge Pregerson, the court held that the Attorney General was not subject to Eleventh Amendment immunity from suit; that the Governor and state of California were entitled to Eleventh Amendment immunity and were dismissed from the suit; and that the district court did not abuse its discretion in finding that there was no serious question of a Due Process violation or a violation of the Commerce Clause, and affirmed the denial of the motion.

A lawsuit was filed in U.S. District Court in Los Angeles on July 2, 2012, seeking to overturn the California foie gras law on the ground that it is unconstitutionally vague. The plaintiffs are two foie gras producers and a southern California restaurant group that served foie gras until the ban took effect. On July 18, 2012, U.S. District Court Judge Stephen V. Wilson denied the plaintiffs' request for a temporary injunction that would have immediately suspended the foie gras ban. On September 19, 2012, Judge Wilson denied the plaintiffs' request for a preliminary injunction against enforcement of the law.

Five animal welfare organizations (the "Proposed Defendant Intervenors") (Farm Sanctuary, Animal Legal Defense Fund, the Marin Humane Society, the Humane Society of the United States, and the Humane Society Veterinary Medical Association) who were sponsors of the challenged law had petitioned to be accepted as defendant intervenors in the case. Judge Wilson denied their petition. On September 7, 2012, the Proposed Defendant Intervenors (the appellants) filed an appeal with the Court of Appeals for the Ninth Circuit. The appellants are appealing Judge Wilson's ruling that excluded them from the case.

Oral arguments on the District Court's denial of the plaintiffs' preliminary injunction were heard on May 8, 2013, before the U.S. Court of Appeals for the Ninth Circuit in Pasadena. In August 2013, the court, in a 3–0 decision, upheld the denial of the preliminary injunction, finding that the law likely violated neither the Due Process Clause nor the Commerce Clause of the U.S. Constitution as asserted by the plaintiffs. In January 2014, the Ninth Circuit Court of Appeals denied a request by foie gras proponents to reconsider their challenge to the law.

On January 7, 2015, U.S. District Judge Stephen V. Wilson held on remand that the portion of California's law banning the sale of foie gras within the state (California Health and Safety Code § 25982) was preempted by the federal Poultry Products Inspection Act (PPIA), and enjoined the California Attorney General from enforcing it. Judge Wilson's decision was appealed to the Ninth Circuit. California's Attorney General, Kamala Harris, argued that the PPIA regulates the ingredients of poultry products, but that the manner in which the birds are fed while alive does not constitute an ingredient and so therefore California's foie gras law is not preempted by the PPIA. On December 7, 2016, the U.S. Court of Appeals for the Ninth Circuit held oral arguments in this appeal in Pasadena. The three-judge panel hearing the arguments consisted of U.S. Circuit Judges Harry Pregerson, Jacqueline Nguyen, and John Owens. On September 15, 2017, the three-judge panel unanimously reversed U.S. District Judge Stephen V. Wilson's January 7, 2015 decision, finding that the California foie gras law is not preempted by the federal Poultry Products Inspections Act.

Opponents appealed the three-judge decision to the full Ninth Circuit (for an en banc rehearing), but the Ninth Circuit did not accept that appeal. Opponents then appealed the decision to the U.S. Supreme Court. On January 8, 2019, the Supreme Court declined to review the lawsuit, allowing the ban to take effect.

== Resistance to the law ==
After the law went into effect on July 1, 2012, a number of restaurants continued to serve foie gras, insisting that they were doing so as a gift to customers rather than selling it to customers.

== See also ==
- Foie gras controversy
- Animal welfare
- Intensive animal farming
