= Papillion (disambiguation) =

Papillion is a city in Nebraska, U.S.

Papillion may also refer to:

- Papillion-La Vista Public Schools
- Papillion-La Vista Senior High School
- Papillion Junior High
- Papillion Creek, Nebraska, U.S.

== See also ==
- Papillon (disambiguation)
