= Culbas =

French card game

- One of the earliest fishing games
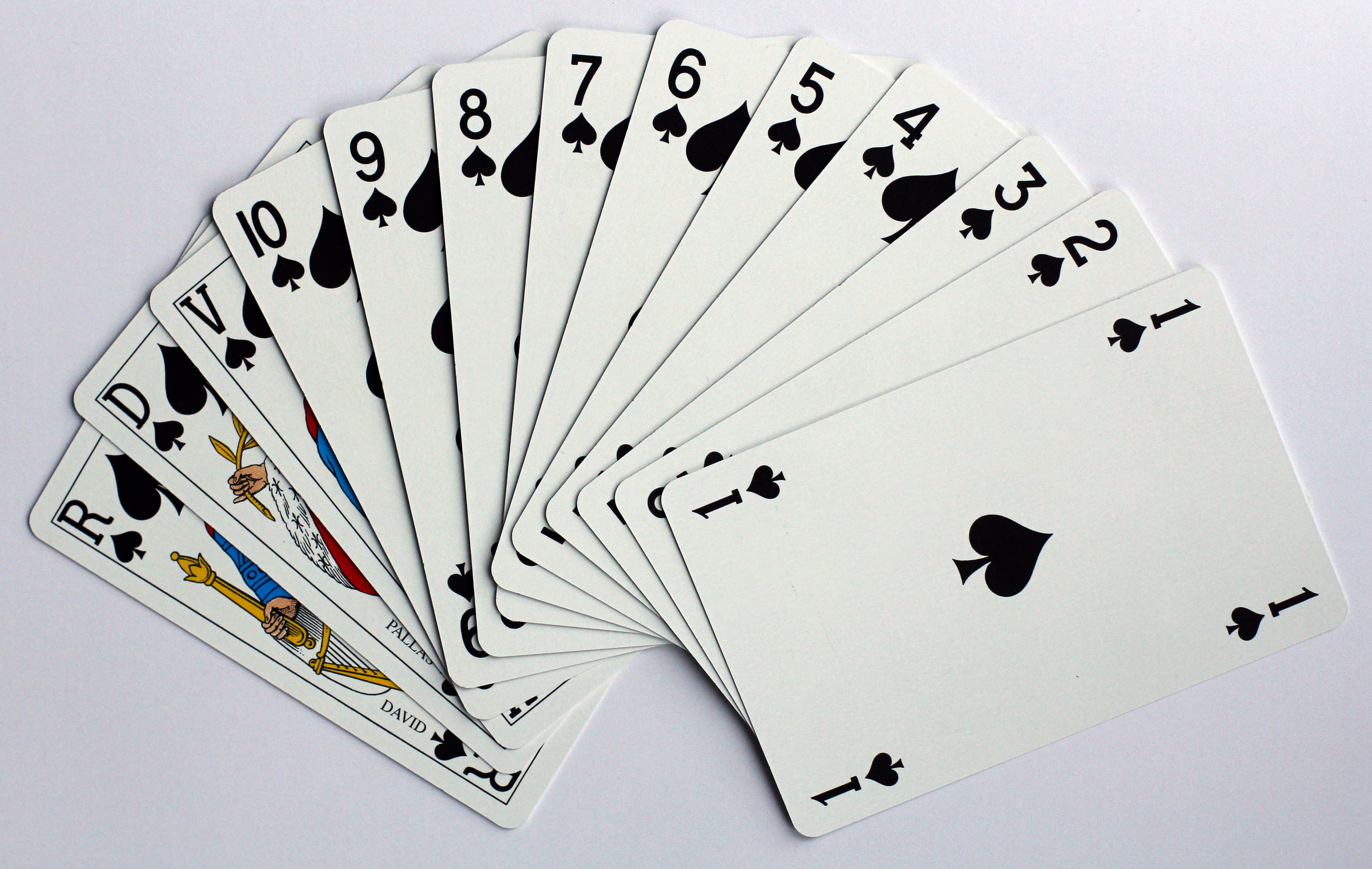
- Suit of Spades from a Paris pattern pack
- Origin: France
- Alternative names: Cul-bas, Cou-bas
- Type: Fishing
- Players: 3–8 (5 or 6 best)
- Cards: 52
- Deck: Paris pattern, French-suited
- Play: Anticlockwise

Related games
- Coquimbert, Papillon

Culbas or Cul-bas is an historical French card game of the fishing type for three to eight players that dates to at least the 17th century. It is described as being "very old" and having "a great simplicity in which chance plays the biggest role."

== History ==
Culbas is one of the oldest European fishing games, being recorded as early as 1658. The English game of Laugh and Lie Down, recorded 1515, is reckoned to be the oldest. The name means something like "bottom down" and refers to a player having to throw their hand down when unable to play. An attempt by Lebrun in 1828 to change the name to Cou-bas ("neck down") failed. Culbas may have been the origin of the French game, Papillon, which appeared in 1725. Culbas appears to have died out by the end of the 19th century.

== Rules ==
The following rules are based on those described by Philippe Lalanne at the Academy of Lost Games (Académie des jeux oubliés):

=== Preliminaries ===
Culbas is a game for three to eight players (five or six are best) using either a 32-card Piquet pack when three or four play, or a standard 52-card, French-suited pack, typically of the Paris pattern, when more play. Suits and card ranking are irrelevant during play; the aim being to match, rather than, beat cards.

A game (partie) comprises a number of rounds (tours), each round in turn consisting of a number of deals (coups) equivalent to the number of players. Players start with four fiches (rectangular chips) and twenty jetons (circular chips), a fiche being worth twenty jetons, enough for around 30-35 deals.

=== Deal and play ===
The cards are fanned, face down, on the table and players draw for the first deal, the lowest card prevailing. For this purpose only, cards rank in their natural order, Aces low, in a 52-card pack; or in Écarté order (K Q J A 10 9 8 7) in a Piquet pack.

Deal and play are anticlockwise. The dealer shuffles, offers to the left for cutting and then deals five cards each (2+3 or 3+2). The next eight cards are spread, face up, on the table and the remaining cards are placed, face down and to the right, as the talon. Next to the talon is a small basket or corbillon for the pool (poule).

Any player who is dealt four of a kind returns them to the dealer, who places them at the bottom of the talon and gives out four replacements.

First hand (premier en cartes), the player to the right of the dealer, begins by playing, if able, one card that matches one of the table cards e.g. a King to a King or a Nine to a Nine. He or she picks up both cards and places them, face down, nearby. A player with three cards of the same rank as a table card, may play them and pick up the table card. If unable to play, either because there are no matching cards or because there are no table cards left, a player must culbas i.e. throw down their hand, combining it with the table cards and drop out of the current deal.

A player who has to culbas and go out, pays as many jetons to the basket as the number of cards left in their hand.

=== Winning and scoring ===
The winner is the first player to shed all five cards by matching. Play ends immediately and those with cards still in their hands are out. If all the players have had to culbas, there is no winner.

The winner sweeps all the chips (jetons and fiches) in the pool. If there is no winner, the pool is carried forward to the next deal.

At the end of the game, players may reckon up their score from the chips they have lost or won and establish a ranking order.

== Bibliography ==
- _ (1665). La Maison des Jeux Académiques. Paris: Étienne Loyson.
- De la Marinière, E. (1659). La maison académique. 2nd edn. Estienne Loison, Paris.
- Lebrun, M. (1832). Manuel de Jeux de Calcul et de Hasard. Paris: Roret.
- Méry, Joseph (1847). L'Arbitre des Jeux. Paris: Gabriel de Gonet.
- Parlett, David (1991). A History of Card Games. Oxford, New York: OUP. p. 185.
