= Eduardo Sousa =

Spanish farmer

Eduardo Sousa Holm is a Spanish farmer who makes goose foie gras without gavage (force feeding), at his farm in Extremadura. Chef Dan Barber described his experience of Sousa's farm in his book, The Third Plate, and at a TED presentation in 2008. on the radio show This American Life in 2011.

Eduardo Sousa has been operating his family farm and adjunct restaurant, La Pateria de Sousa, which claims to have been in continual production since 1812. La Pateria de Sousa was awarded the Coup de Coeur award at the Salon International d'Alimentation, SIAL 2006, in Paris.

Sousa's farm affords the geese an abundance of foods that grow on the property, from figs to acorns, and various naturally occurring herbs such as the seeds from the yellow bush lupine which gives his foie gras the characteristically yellow color of foie gras that is usually produced through the force-feeding process using corn.

== See also ==
- Foie gras controversy
