= John Papillon =

British photographer (1838–1891)

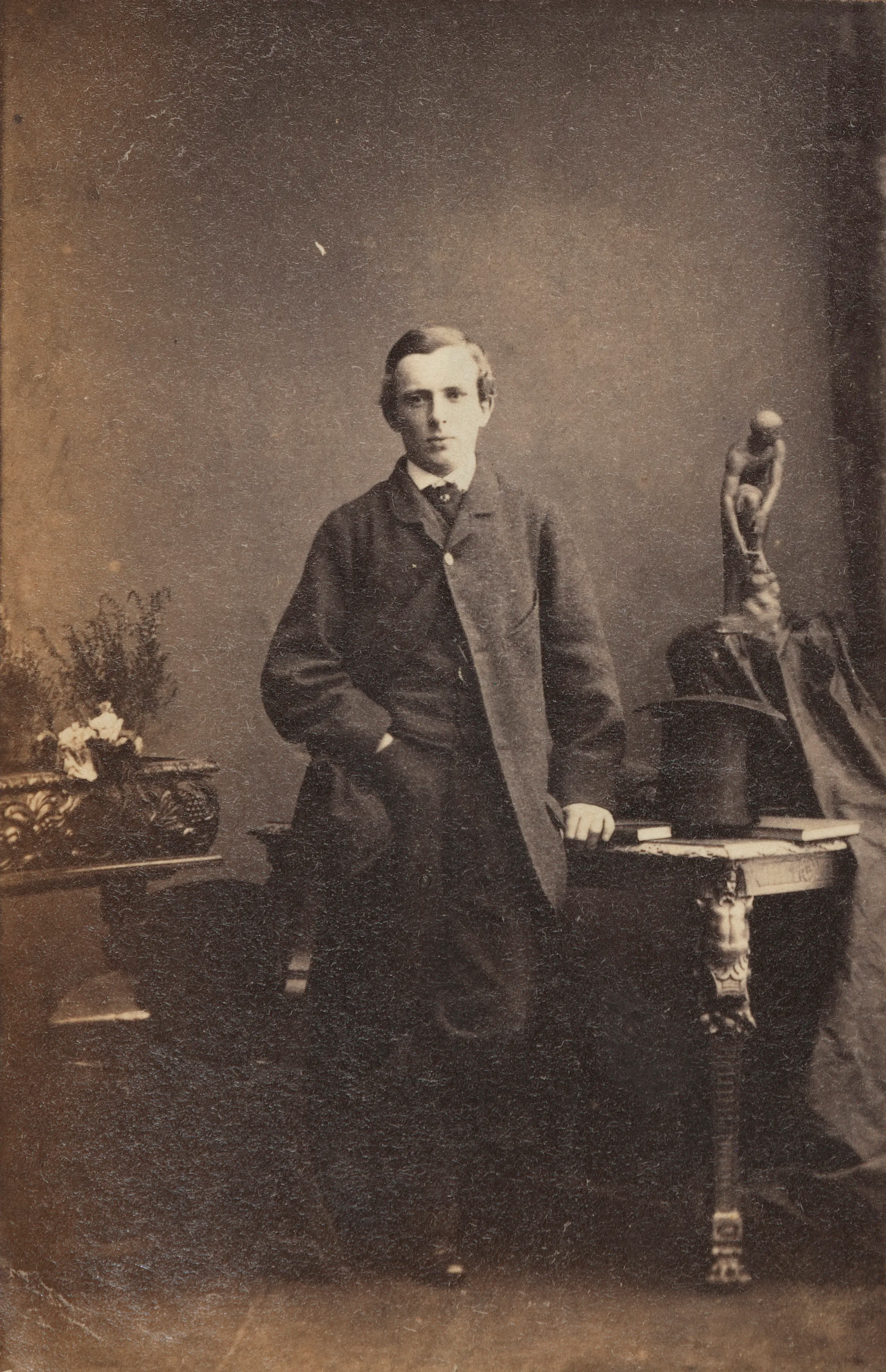
Portrait by Camille Silvy, 1861

John Ashton Papillon (1838–1891) was a British photographer and Royal Engineer who was commissioned to accompany and photographically document the Anglo-French military invasion to northern China during the Second Opium War in 1860. Papillon produced images taken from between Canton and the Taku Forts but became ill and was evacuated on 29 September 1860 before completing his mission.
