= SIAL Paris =

Bi-annual trade fair

Logo of SIAL Paris

The Global Food Marketplace (French: Salon International de l’alimentation, or SIAL) is a trade fair held every two years, which specializes in the food processing industry. This event was first held in 1964 in Paris.

== History ==
The SIAL was established in 1964 by several groups, including the Confédération Générale de l'Alimentation en détail (General Confederation of the Retail Food Trade), and at the instigation of public authorities (Ministry of Agriculture (France)|Ministry of Agriculture, Paris Chamber of Commerce). Twenty-six countries participated in the first fair, which was held at the Center of New Industries and Technologies (French: Centre des nouvelles industries et technologies|CNIT) in La Défense, as part of International Food Week. The second SIAL was held in 1966, also at the CNIT.

The trade show was held at the Versailles Gate Exhibition Centre from 1968 to 1984 and at the North Paris-Villepinte Exposition Park since 1986.

In 2014, SIAL Paris marks a new stage by integrating the Salon International du Process et du Conditionnement Alimentaire (IPA show), which will be represented within the Equipment, Technology and Services sector.

== Characteristics ==
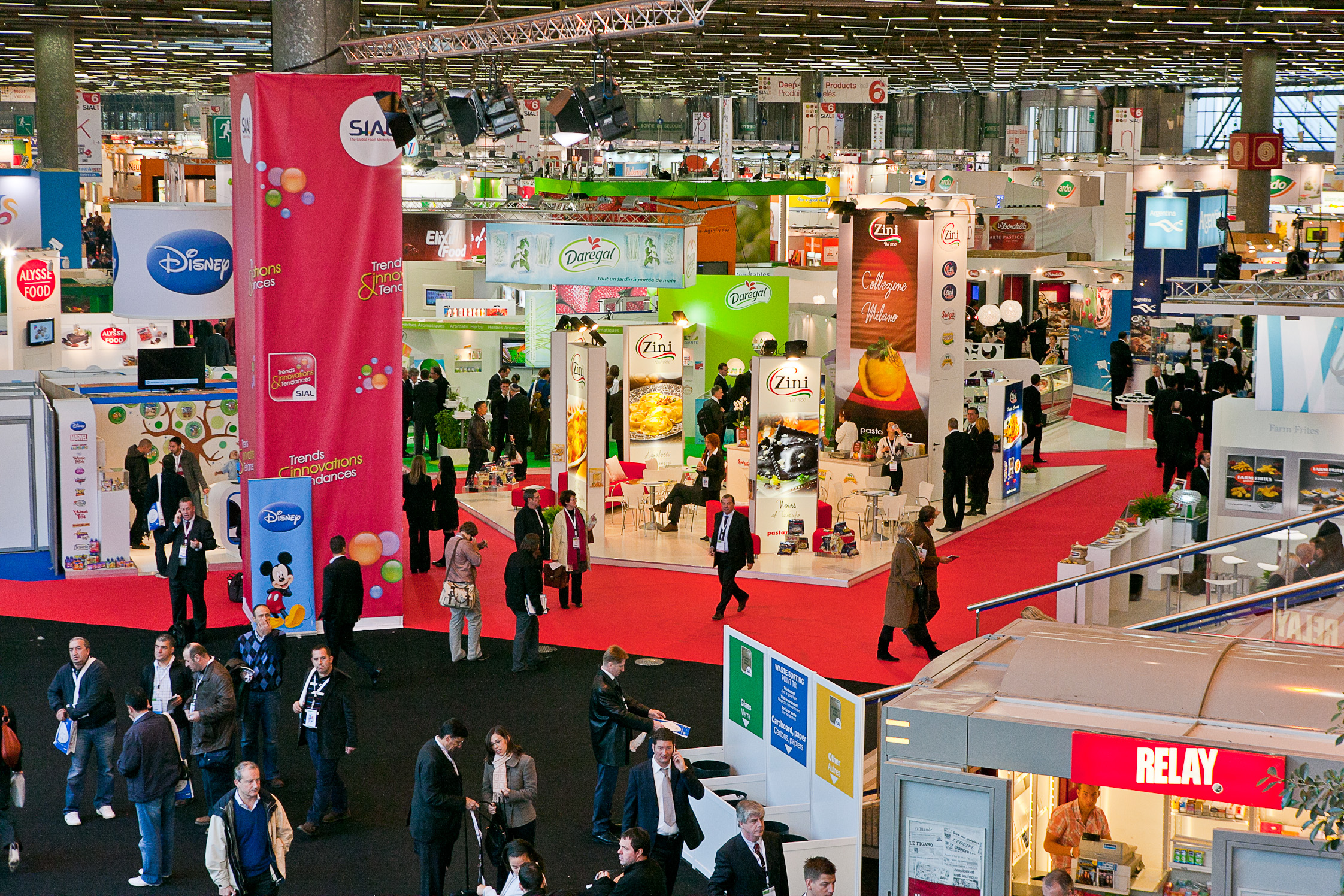
View of SIAL Paris

SIAL Paris has given rise to six other trade fairs, all members of the SIAL Group network, in China, in United Arab Emirates, in Canada and in Brazil. In 2014, SIAL Group launches a new trade show in the Philippines called SIAL ASEAN.

Within the scope of SIAL Innovation, the agencies XTC and TNS Sofres present a comparative analysis of food-related trends and innovations. The study conducted by TNS Sofres puts the attitudes of consumers in seven countries (France, Germany, Great Britain, Spain, Russia, United States and China) in perspective, with regard to the trends identified by XTC.

== Visitors ==
The fair's visitors come from various sectors of the food processing industry, such as distribution, trade, food services, viticulture, etc. Approximately 70% of the visitors visit the fair in search of new products and suppliers.

Fair attendance
	Number of visitors	Visitors from outside France (%)	Represented countries
2010	150,258	62,8%	200 countries

The top 15 visiting countries are:

- France
- Italy
- Belgium
- Netherlands
- United Kingdom
- Spain
- Germany
- United States
- Canada
- Russia
- Brazil
- China
- Turkey
- Poland
- Greece

Visitors distribution by sector
Distribution	Food Service	Food Industry	Services
54%	18%	24%	4%
Supermarkets and Hypermarkets; Central Buying; Retail Trade; Wholesale / trade; Importer / Exporter	Commercial catering; Institutional catering; Distributors / wholesalers	Production; Transformation; Intermediate food products	

== Exhibitors ==
The majority of the participants are suppliers of finished food products. They exhibit individually (direct exhibitor) or collectively (for example, in a national pavilion). This second option represents 61% of the fair's surface area.

Exhibitors
Year	2008	2010	2012
Number of exhibitors	5,472	5,838	5,890

79% of the exhibitors are from national (with less than 250 employees) and international small and medium enterprises and 21% are from large groups. The number of international exhibitors has grown from 2,260 in 1992 to 4,746 in 2010.

Distribution of exhibitors in the different exhibition sectors in 2010
Sector	Fresh products	Dry products	Intermediate food products	Frozen foods	Drinks	Wines and spirits
Number of exhibitors	1,737	2,763	329	425	514	232

The exhibition sectors :

- Beverages
- Cured meats
- Tinned and preserved products
- Grocery products
- Fruit and vegetables
- Organic products
- Seafood
- Health products and food supplements
- Gourmet foods
- Frozen foods
- Bakery, pastry and confectionery
- Delicatessen products
- Dairy products
- Poultry and game
- Meat
- Wine
- National pavilions and regions of the world
- Regions of France
- IN-FOOD/Semi-processed food products, ingredients and outsourcing
- Equipment and technologies

== Sustainable development and solidarity ==
Each time the fair takes place, almost 50 tons of products are collected and redistributed to French Red Cross centers in Seine-Saint-Denis. In addition, the fair processes organic waste. In 2012, a partnership is set to be formed with Utopies, with the aim of emphasizing sustainable development.

== Editions of SIAL abroad ==
- The first edition of SIAL Brazil took place June 25 to 28, 2012 in São Paulo.
- SIAL Middle East is an annual fair, established in 2010, which takes place in Abu Dhabi.
- Established in 2001, SIAL Canada is an annual fair, which takes place in Montreal in even-numbered years and in Toronto in odd-numbered years. Next Dates: May 2 to 4, 2017
- Established in 1999 in Singapore, the annual SIAL China fair has taken place in Shanghai since the year 2000.
- The first edition of SIAL ASEAN took place June 11 to 13, 2014 in the Philippines.

== Organization chart of SIAL ==
In addition to its managing director, SIAL has a supervisory board and a board of directors. Comexposium, a subsidiary of the CCIP and of the UK private equity firm Charterhouse, and SOPEXA are the principal shareholders of SIAL.
