= Foie gras =

French culinary dish

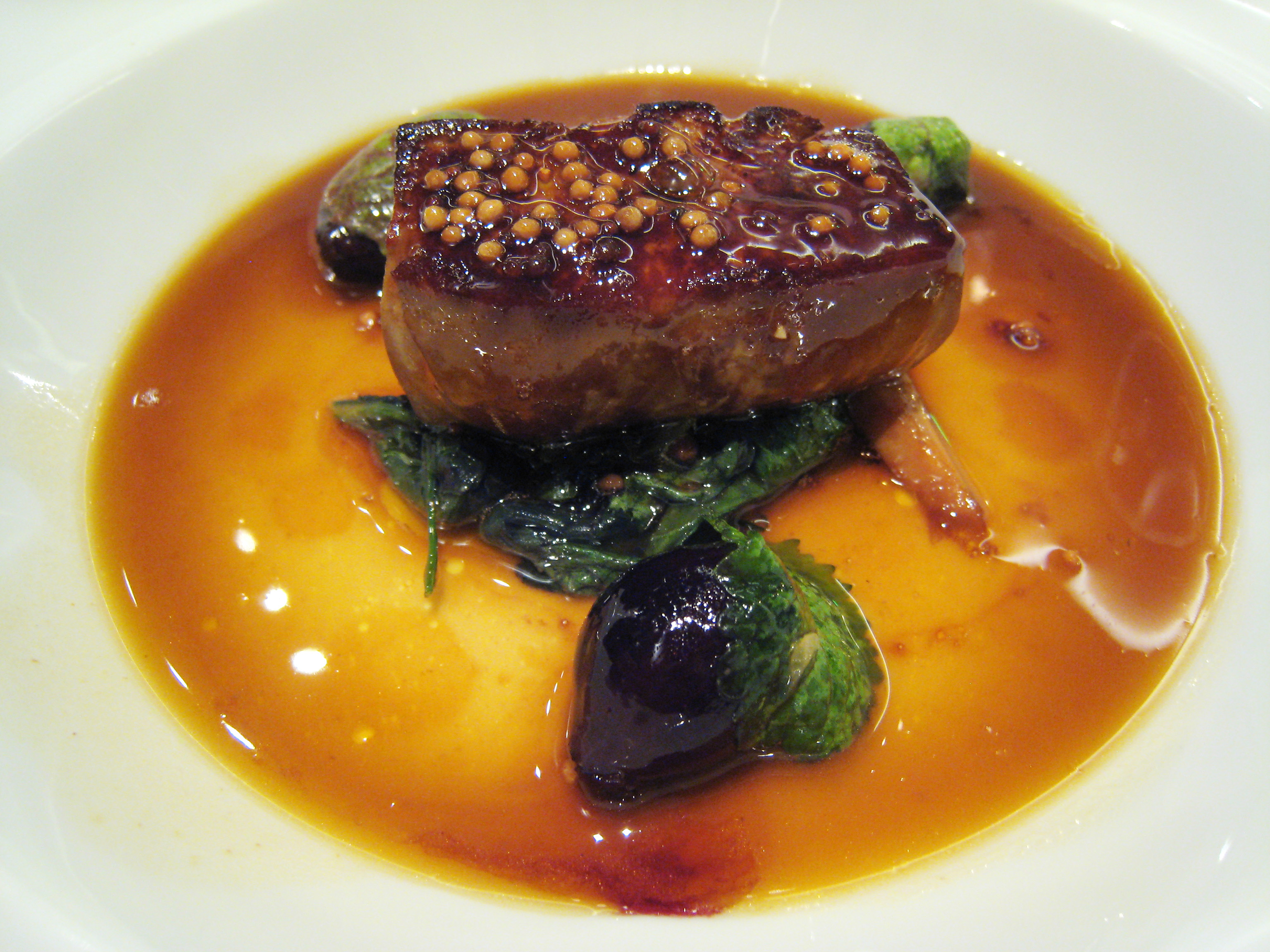
- Foie gras with mustard seeds and spring onions in duck jus
- Type: Whole, mousse, parfait, or spread
- Main ingredients: Liver of a duck or goose

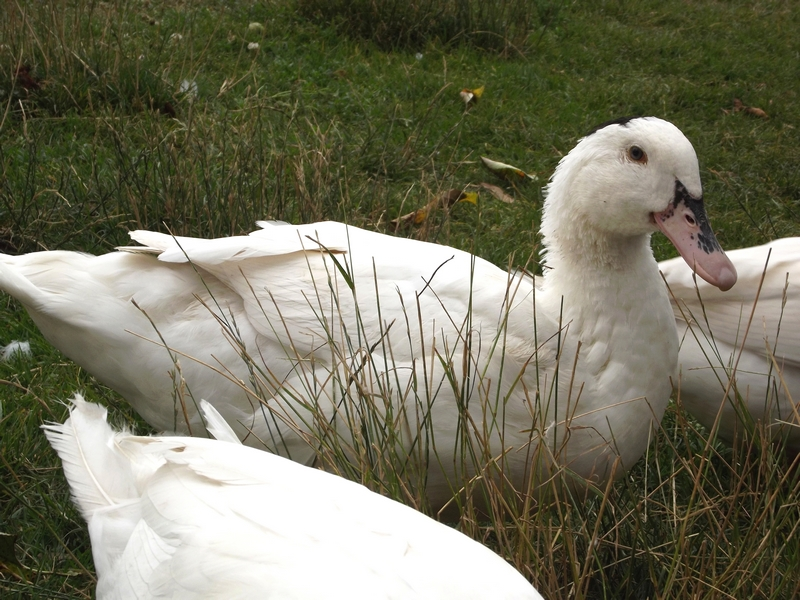
A mulard duck, the hybrid used most frequently for foie gras production

Foie gras (lit. 'fat liver'; French: [fwa ɡʁɑ], English: /ˌfwɑːˈɡrɑː/; Occitan: foiè grass) is a specialty food product made of the liver of a duck or goose. According to French law, foie gras is defined as the liver of a duck or goose fattened by gavage (force feeding).

Foie gras is a delicacy in French cuisine. Its flavour is rich, buttery, and delicate, unlike an ordinary duck or goose liver. It is sold whole or is prepared as mousse, parfait, or pâté, and may also be served as an accompaniment to another food item, such as steak. French law states, "Foie gras belongs to the protected cultural and gastronomical heritage of France."

The technique of gavage dates as far back as 2500 BC, when the ancient Egyptians began confining anatid birds to be forcedly fed to be fattened as a food source. Today, France is by far the largest producer and consumer of foie gras, though there are producers and markets worldwide, particularly in other European nations, the United States, and China.

Gavage-based foie gras production is controversial due mainly to animal welfare concerns about force-feeding, intensive housing and husbandry, and enlarging the liver to 10 times its usual volume. Several countries and jurisdictions have laws against force-feeding and the production, import, or sale of foie gras.

== History ==
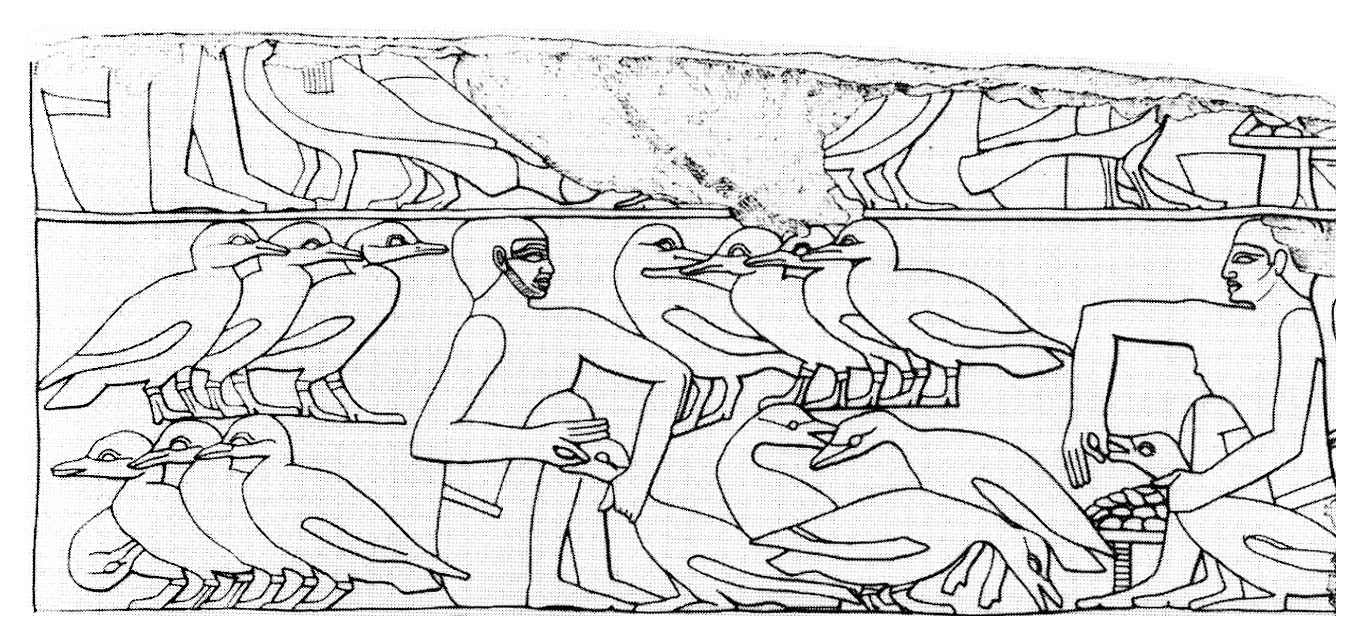
A bas-relief depiction of overfeeding geese

=== Ancient times ===
As early as 2500 BC, the ancient Egyptians learned that many birds could be fattened through forced overfeeding and began this practice. Whether they particularly sought the fattened livers of birds as a delicacy remains undetermined. In the necropolis of Saqqara, in the tomb of Mereruka, an important royal official, there is a bas-relief scene wherein workers grasp geese around the necks to push food down their throats. Tables are positioned to one side, piled with food pellets and a flask for moistening them before feeding the geese.

The practice of goose fattening spread from Egypt to the Mediterranean. The earliest reference to fattened geese is from the 5th-century BC Greek poet Cratinus, who wrote of geese-fatteners, yet Egypt maintained its reputation as the source for fattened geese. When the Spartan king Agesilaus visited Egypt in 361 BC, he noted that Egyptian farmers fattened geese and calves.

It was not until the Roman period, however, that foie gras is mentioned as a distinct food, which the Romans named iecur ficatum; iecur means liver, and ficatum derives from ficus, meaning fig in Latin. The emperor Elagabalus fed his dogs foie gras during the four years of his reign. Pliny the Elder (1st century AD) credits his contemporary Roman gastronome Marcus Gavius Apicius with feeding dried figs to geese to enlarge their livers:

"Apicius made the discovery that we may employ the same artificial method of increasing the size of the liver of the sow, as of that of the goose; it consists in cramming them with dried figs, and when they are fat enough, they are drenched with wine mixed with honey and immediately killed."

— Pliny the Elder, Natural History, Book VIII. Chapter 77

Hence the term iecur ficatum, fig-stuffed liver; feeding figs to enlarge a goose's liver may derive from Hellenistic Alexandria, since much of Roman luxury cuisine was of Greek inspiration. Ficatum was closely associated with animal liver and it became the root word for "liver" in each of these languages: foie in French, hígado in Spanish, fígado in Portuguese, fegato in Italian, fetge in Catalan and Occitan, and ficat in Romanian, all meaning "liver"; this etymology has been explained in different manners.

=== Postclassical Europe ===
After the fall of the Roman empire, goose liver temporarily vanished from European cuisine. Some claim that Gallic farmers preserved the foie gras tradition until the rest of Europe rediscovered it centuries later, but the medieval French peasant's food animals were mainly pigs and sheep. Others claim that the tradition was preserved by the Jews, who learned the method of enlarging a goose's liver during the Roman colonisation of Judea or earlier from Egyptians. The Jews carried this culinary knowledge as they migrated farther north and west to Europe.

As Jews became established in Western and Central Europe, they encountered difficulties finding suitable cooking fat for use in dishes containing meat or to be served with meat. Lard was widely available, but Judaic dietary law, Kashrut, completely forbids it because it comes from an animal considered unclean. Butter, also commonly available, was not in itself proscribed, but it could not be used with or in meals containing meat because kashrut also prohibited mixing meat and dairy products. Jewish cuisine used olive oil in the Mediterranean and sesame oil in Babylonia, but neither cooking medium was readily available in Western and Central Europe. Jews in these regions therefore turned to poultry fat (known in Yiddish as schmaltz), which could be abundantly produced by overfeeding geese, where fat was needed with meat.

The delicate taste of the fattened goose's liver was soon appreciated; Hans Wilhelm Kirchhof of Kassel wrote in 1562 that the Jews raise fat geese and particularly love their livers. Some rabbis were concerned that eating forcibly overfed geese violated Jewish food restrictions. Some rabbis contended that it is not a forbidden food (treyf) as none of its limbs are damaged and the geese do not feel any pain in their throats from the process. This matter remained a debated topic in Jewish dietary law until the Jewish taste for goose liver declined in the 19th century. Another kashrut matter, still a problem today, is that even properly slaughtered and inspected meat must be drained of blood before being considered fit to eat. Usually, salting achieves that; however, as the liver is regarded as "(almost) wholly blood", broiling is the only way of kashering. Properly broiling foie gras while preserving its delicate taste is difficult, and therefore rarely practised. Even so, there are restaurants in Israel that offer grilled goose foie gras. Foie gras also resembles the Jewish food staple, chopped liver.

Appreciation of fattened goose liver spread to gastronomes outside the Jewish community, who could buy in the local Jewish ghetto of their cities. In 1570, Bartolomeo Scappi, chef de cuisine to Pope Pius V, published his cookbook Opera, wherein he writes that "the liver of [a] domestic goose raised by the Jews is of extreme size and weighs [between] two and three pounds". In 1581, Marx Rumpolt of Mainz, chef to several German nobles, published the massive cookbook Ein Neu Kochbuch, describing that the Jews of Bohemia produced livers weighing more than three pounds; he lists recipes for it, including one for goose liver mousse. János Keszei, chef to the court of Michael Apafi, the prince of Transylvania, included foie gras recipes in his 1680 cookbook A New Book About Cooking, instructing cooks to "envelop the goose liver in a calf's thin skin, bake it and prepare [a] green or [a] brown sauce to accompany it. I used goose liver fattened by Bohemian Jews; its weight was more than three pounds. You may also prepare a mush of it."

=== Cultural significance in France ===
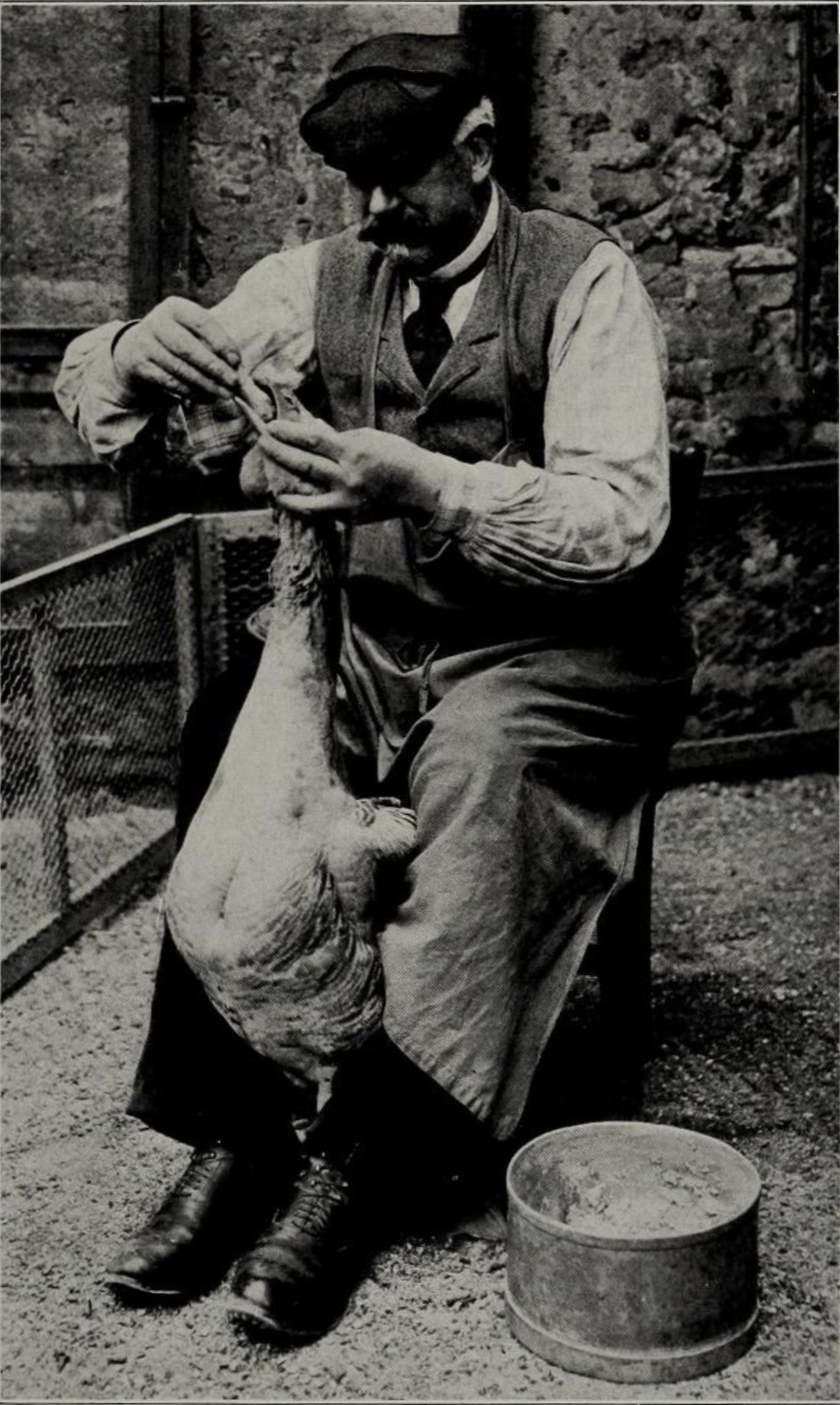
Gavage for fois gras in early 20th century France

Foie gras became a significant part of French culinary tradition during the 17th and 18th centuries, particularly under the reigns of Louis XV and Louis XVI. It was served at royal courts as a symbol of luxury and refinement. In 1779, French chef Jean-Joseph Clause elevated foie gras to new heights by creating pâté de foie gras. His innovation earned him a patent in 1784, and he later established a business supplying this delicacy to the French aristocracy. By the early 19th century, Strasbourg had become renowned as the "goose-liver capital of the world".

After the French Revolution, foie gras transitioned from being an exclusive royal delicacy to one enjoyed by the middle class. Its production and consumption became particularly associated with Southwest France, including regions like Dordogne and Alsace, where traditional methods of preparation flourished. Today, these regions remain central to foie gras production in France, with over 90% of producers located in the Dordogne Valley.

Foie gras is so deeply embedded in French culture that it is protected under French law, which declares it part of the country's "protected cultural and gastronomical heritage."

The legacy of foie gras in France reflects its evolution from a courtly luxury to an enduring emblem of French gastronomy, celebrated at festivals such as the Fest’Oie in Sarlat and enjoyed during holidays and special occasions.

In the late 1980s, the Chernobyl disaster produced radioactive clouds over France and Hungary, then the large producers of foie gras. In their stead, areas of northeast Spain began producing fois gras, establishing a local industry.

== Production and sales ==
Country	Production (tons, 2005)	% of total (2005)	Production (tons, 2014)	% of total (2014)	Production (tons, 2020)	% of total (2020)
France	18,450	78.5%	19,608	74.3%	14,266	63.7%
Bulgaria	1,500	6.4%	2,600	9.8%	2,752	12.3%
Hungary	1,920	8.2%	2,590	9.8%	2,147	9.6%
United States	340 (2003)	1.4%	250	0.9%	?	
Canada	200 (2005)	0.9%	200	0.8%	?	
China	150	0.6%	500	1.9%	7,000	
Others	940	4.0%	648	2.5%	?	
Total	23,500	100%	26,396	100%	22,409	100%

In the 21st century, France is the largest producer and consumer of foie gras, though it is produced and consumed in several other countries worldwide, particularly in some other European nations, the United States, and China. Approximately 30,000 people work in the French foie gras industry, with 90% of them residing in the Périgord (Dordogne), Aquitaine in the southwest, and Alsace in the east. The European Union recognizes the foie gras produced according to traditional farming methods (label rouge) in southwestern France with a protected geographical indication.

Hungary is the world's second-largest foie gras (libamáj) producer and the largest exporter (although Bulgaria sometimes had a higher production in recent years, see table above). France is the principal market for Hungarian foie gras – mainly exported raw. Approximately 30,000 Hungarian goose farmers are dependent on the foie gras industry. French food companies spice, process, and cook the foie gras so it may be sold as a French product in its domestic and export markets.

=== 2005 ===
In 2005, France produced 18,450 tonnes of foie gras (78.5% of the world's estimated total production of 23,500 tonnes), of which 96% was duck liver and 4% goose liver. Total French consumption of foie gras this year was 19,000 tonnes. In 2005, Hungary, the world's second-largest foie gras producer, exported 1,920 tonnes, and Bulgaria produced 1,500 tons of foie gras.

The demand for foie gras in the Far East is such that China has become a sizeable producer. Madagascar is a small but rapidly growing producer of high-quality foie gras.

=== 2011 ===
In 2011, in Bulgaria (which started production in 1960), five million mule ducks were raised for foie gras on 800 farms, making Bulgaria the second-largest European producer.

=== 2012 ===
In 2012, France produced approximately 19,000 tonnes of foie gras, representing 75% of the world's production in that year. This required the force-feeding of around 38 million ducks and geese. World production in 2015 is estimated as 27,000 tonnes.

=== 2014–2015 ===
In 2014, the whole of the EU produced approximately 25,000 tonnes of foie gras – 23,000 tonnes of duck foie gras and 2,000 tonnes of goose foie gras. The same year, France was producing 72% of world foie gras production, of which 97% was from ducks.

In 2014, France produced 19,608 tons of foie gras (74.3% of the world's estimated total production).

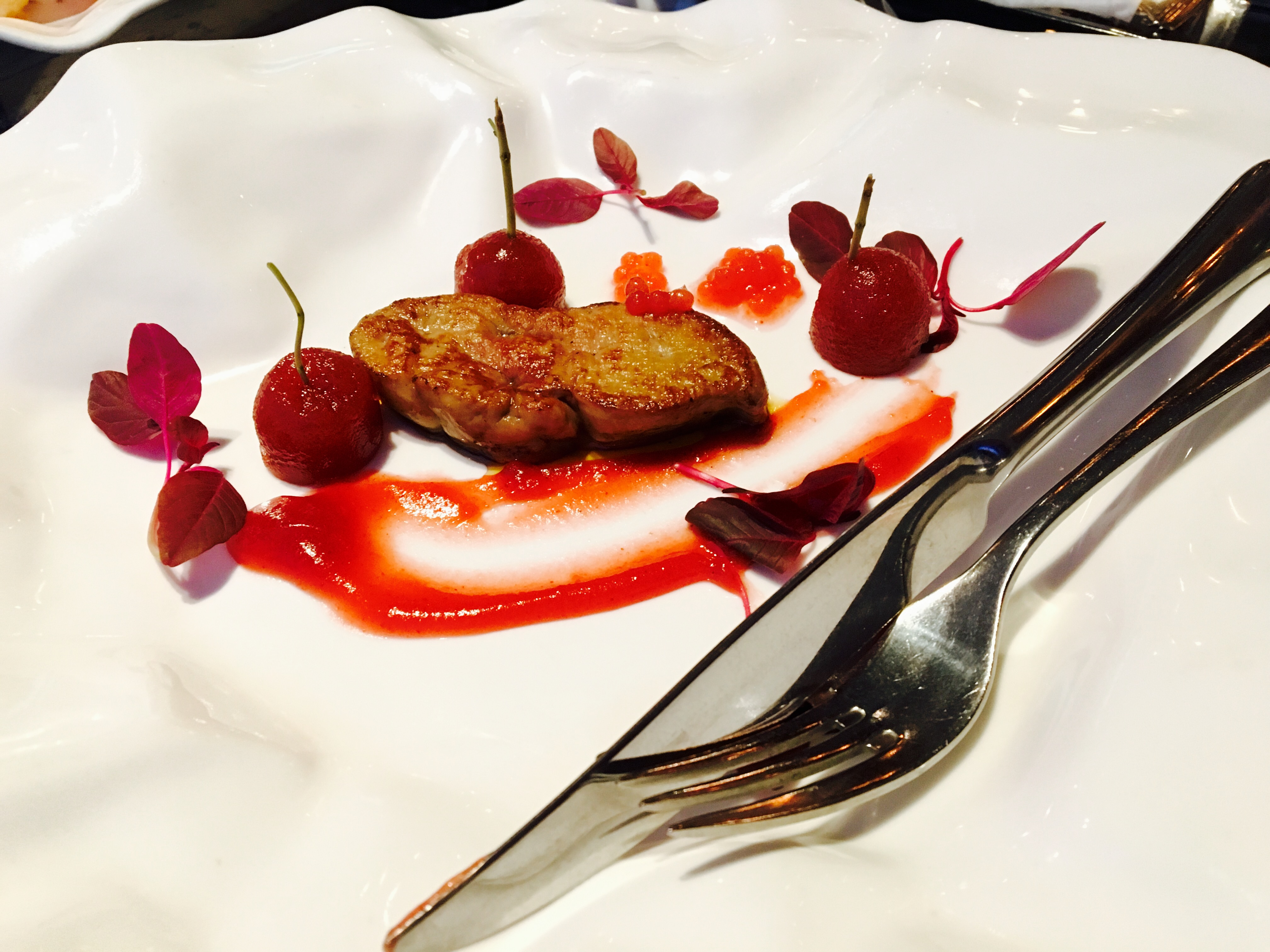
Foie gras served with hawthorn puree

In 2015, it was reported that in France, sales of foie gras may be waning, and an OpinionWay poll found that 47% of the French population supported a ban on force-feeding.

=== 2015–2016 ===
In 2016, it was reported that France produces an estimated 75% of the world's foie gras and southwestern France produces approximately 70% of that total. In 2016, it could retail for upwards of $65 a pound.

In late 2015, there were several outbreaks of the highly contagious H5N1 bird flu in France, which escalated in 2016. This led to Algeria, China, Egypt, Japan, Morocco, South Korea, Thailand and Tunisia banning French poultry exports, including foie gras, and France to initiate increased bio-security protocols which cost an estimated 220 million euros. One of these measures was the halting of production in southwestern France from early April 2016 for an anticipated period of three months to reduce the spread of the virus. Exports of foie gras from France are expected to decrease from 4,560 tonnes in 2015 to 3,160 in 2016.

The largest producer in the United States is Hudson Valley Foie Gras in New York, which processes approximately 350,000 ducks annually.

=== 2019 ===
In 2019, the New York City Council passed a law prohibiting stores and restaurants from selling foie gras, due to animal welfare concerns. As of September 2026, the legislation has not been implemented due to a court challenge on the basis that the local law is inconsistent with New York state legislation.

=== 2026 ===
In 2026, Washington DC passed Initiative 86, the Prohibit Force-Feeding Birds and Sale of Foie Gras and Other Fattened Bird Liver Products Initiative which is due to take effect July 7th 2027. The act will "[prohibit] the force-feeding of birds to enlarge their livers and banning the commercial sale, distribution, and importation of foie gras and other fattened bird liver products in Washington, D.C., with exemptions for force-feeding directed by a licensed veterinarian solely for therapeutic purposes."

== Forms ==
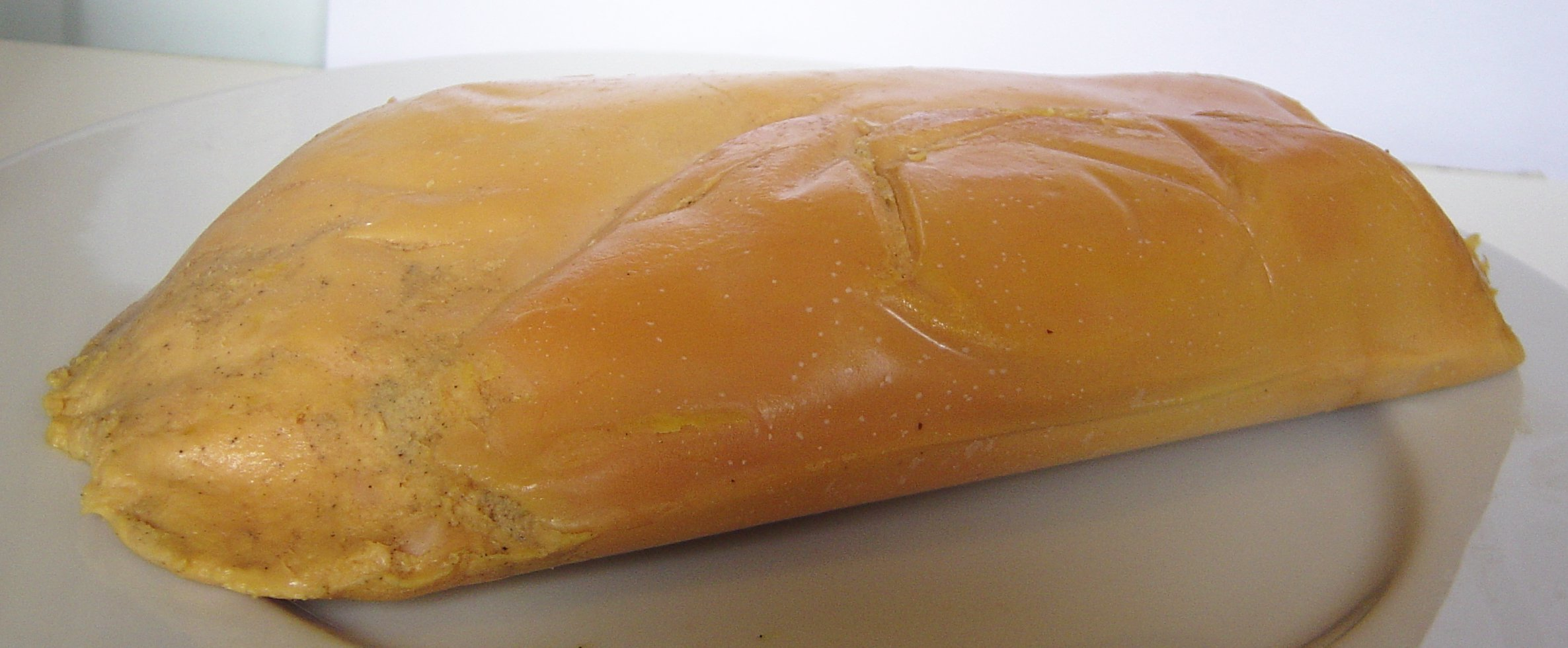
An entire foie gras (ready for cooking in a terrine)

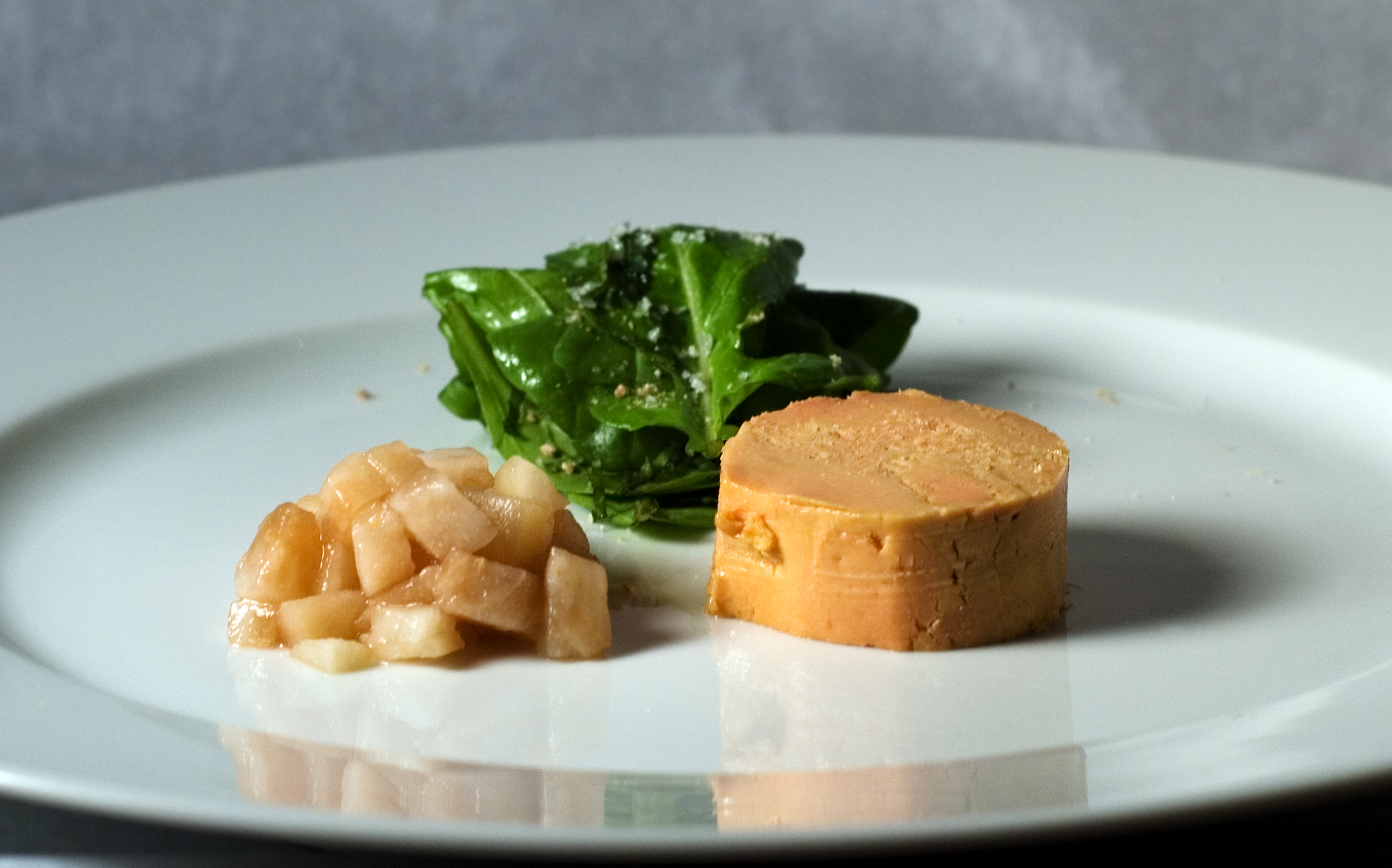
A Moulard duck foie gras torchon with pickled pear

In France, foie gras exists in different, legally defined presentations, ordered by expense:

- foie gras entier ("whole foie gras"), made of one or two whole liver lobes; either cuit ("cooked"), mi-cuit ("semi-cooked"), or frais ("fresh");
- foie gras, made of pieces of livers reassembled together;
- bloc de foie gras, a fully cooked, moulded block composed of 98% or more foie gras; if termed avec morceaux ("with pieces"), it must contain at least 50% foie gras pieces for goose, and 30% for duck.

Additionally, there is pâté de foie gras, mousse de foie gras (either must contain 50% or more foie gras), parfait de foie gras (must contain 75% or more foie gras), and other preparations (no legal obligation established).

Fully cooked preparations are generally sold in either glass containers or metal cans for long-term preservation. Whole, fresh foie gras is usually unavailable in France outside Christmas, except in some producers' markets in the producing regions. Frozen whole foie gras sometimes is sold in French supermarkets.

Whole foie gras is readily available from gourmet retailers in Canada, the United States, Hungary, Argentina and regions with a sizeable market for the product. In the US, raw foie gras is classified as Grade A, B or C. Grade A is typically the highest in fat and especially suited for low-temperature preparation because the veins are relatively few and the resulting terrine will be more aesthetically appealing because it displays little blood. Grade B is accepted for higher temperature preparation because the higher proportion of protein gives the liver more structure after being seared. Grade C livers are generally reserved for making sauces as well as other preparations where a higher proportion of blood-filled veins will not impair the appearance of the dish.

== Production methods ==
=== Species, breeds, and sex used ===
==== Geese ====
Traditionally, foie gras was produced from special breeds of geese. However, by 2004, geese accounted for less than 10% of the total global foie gras production and by 2014 only 5% of total French production. Goose breeds used in modern foie gras production are primarily the grey Landes goose (Anser anser) and the Toulouse goose.

In 2016, Hungary was producing 80% of the world's goose foie gras; however, production rates are likely to drop in 2017 due to outbreaks of bird flu.

==== Ducks ====
In 2014, ducks accounted for 95% of foie gras production. The breeds primarily used are the Muscovy duck (Cairina moschata) (also called the Barbary duck) and the hybrid cross of a male Muscovy duck and a female Pekin duck (Anas platyrhynchos domestica) called the Mulard duck. This hybrid is sterile and is, therefore, sometimes referred to as a "mule" duck. Mulards are estimated to account for about 35% of all foie gras consumed in the US. About 95% of duck foie gras production from France comes from force-fed Mulards and the remaining 5% from the Muscovy duck.

After hatching, the Mulard ducklings are sexed. Males put on more weight than females, so the females are slaughtered. A new method has been recently developed, allowing to identify the sex of the duck in the egg, based on its eye colour. This new method should replace the slaughter of females after hatching within a few years.

=== Physiological basis ===
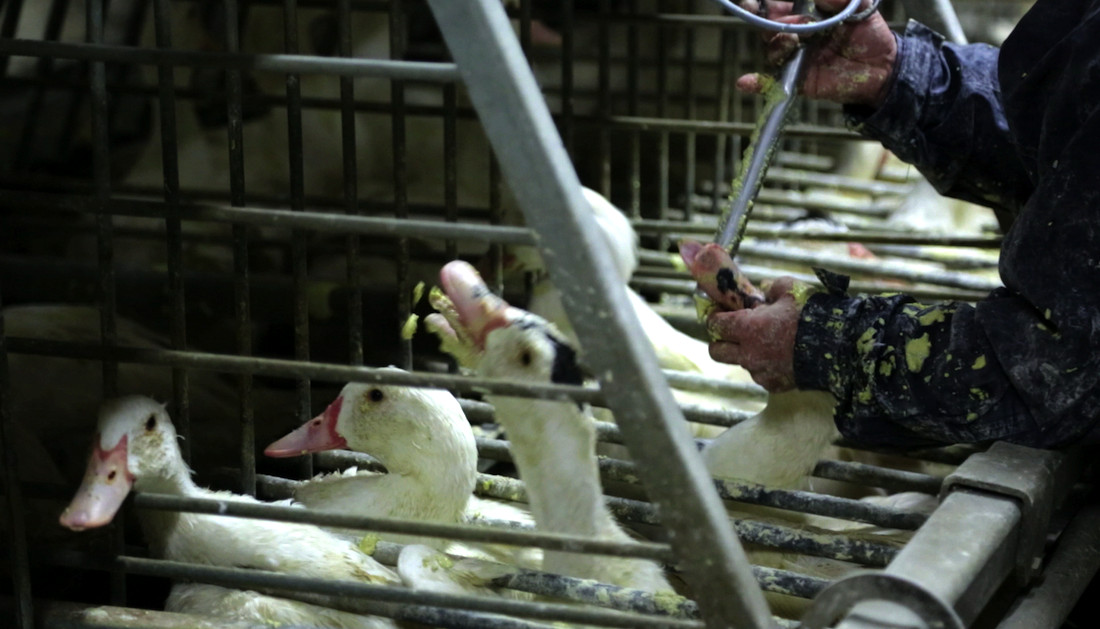
Collectives cages are the main housing system since the ban of individual cages ("épinettes") in Europe.

The basis of foie gras production is the ability that some waterfowl have to expand their esophagus and to gain weight, particularly in the liver, in preparation for migration. Wild geese may consume 300 grams of protein and another 800 grams of grasses per day. Farmed geese allowed to graze on carrots adapt to eating 100 grams of protein but may consume up to 2500 grams of carrots per day. The increasing amount of feed given before force-feeding and during the force-feeding itself cause the expansion of the lower part of the esophagus. However, the primary birds used for foie gras, the Mulard and Muscovy duck, cannot fly well and therefore do not migrate.

==== Pre-feeding phase ====
The pre-force feeding phase consists of three stages.

1. The first stage ("start-up") lasts from 1 to 28 days of age (0–4 weeks). During this stage, the young birds are housed in large, indoor groups (e.g. 2,100), usually on straw.
2. The second stage ("growth") lasts from 28 to 63 days of age (4–9 weeks). The birds are moved outside to feed on grasses ad libitum. The birds are given additional feed, but access to this is limited by time. This stage aims to take advantage of the natural dilation capacity of the esophagus of some wildfowl.
3. The third stage ("pre-fattening") lasts from 63 to 81 days of age (9–12 weeks). The birds are brought inside for gradually longer periods while introduced to a high-starch diet. This is a feeding transition where the food is distributed by meals, first in restricted amounts and time and, after that, greatly increased.

==== Feeding phase ====
The next production phase, which the French call gavage or finition d'engraissement, or "completion of fattening", involves forced daily ingestion of controlled amounts of feed for 10 to 12 days for ducks (10.5 on average) and 15 to 18 days with geese. During this phase, ducks are usually fed twice daily, while geese are usually fed three times daily. To facilitate the handling of ducks during gavage, these birds are housed throughout this phase in one of the following systems:

- Elevated collective cages indoor
- Elevated collective pens indoor
- Ground pens indoor

Individual cages ("épinettes" in French) have been banned in Europe.

Typical foie gras production involves force-feeding birds more food than they would eat in the wild, and much more than they would voluntarily eat domestically.

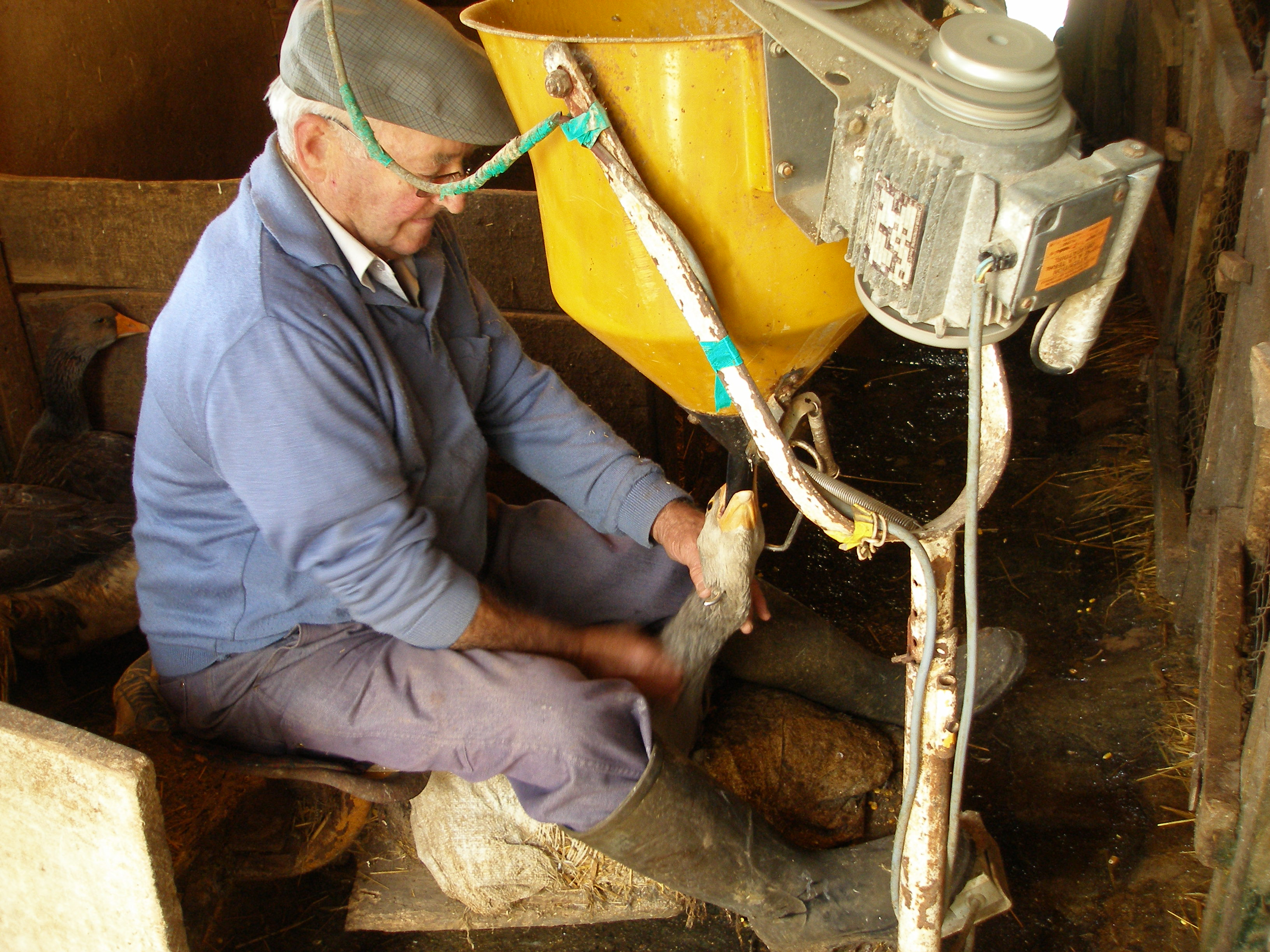
Modern gavage feeding process

In modern production, the bird is typically fed a controlled amount of feed, depending on the stage of the fattening process, the bird's weight, and the amount of feed the bird last ingested. At the start of production, a bird might be fed a dry weight of 250 grams (9 oz) of food per day and up to 1,000 grams (35 oz) (in dry weight) by the end of the process. The actual amount of food force-fed is much greater because water is added to the dry feed. For pellets, the typical composition is about 53% dry and 47% liquid (by weight). This is the equivalent of around 1,900 grams per day in total mass. For whole grain, the cooked weight is about 1.4 times the dry weight.

The feed is administered using a funnel fitted with a long metal or plastic tube (20–30 cm long), which forces the feed into the bird's esophagus. If an auger is used, the feeding takes about 45 to 60 seconds, however, modern systems usually use a tube fed by a pneumatic pump with an operation time of 2 to 3 seconds per duck. During feeding, efforts are made to avoid damaging the bird's esophagus, which could cause injury or death, although researchers have found evidence of inflammation of the walls of the proventriculus after the first session of force-feeding. There is also an indication of inflammation of the esophagus in the later stages of fattening. Several studies have also demonstrated that mortality rates can be significantly elevated during the gavage period.

The feed, usually corn boiled with fat (to facilitate ingestion), deposits large amounts of fat in the liver, thereby producing the buttery consistency sought by some gastronomes.

Ducks reared for foie gras are typically slaughtered at 100 days of age, although modern production methods with shortened pre-feeding and force feeding phases allow for an earlier slaughter, around 93 days. For geese, slaughter typically takes place at 112 days. The bird's liver is 6 to 10 times its ordinary size at this time. Storage of fat in the liver produces steatosis of the liver cells.

=== Alternative production ===
Ethical concerns have driven a recent interest in alternative production methods that produce fattened liver without gavage, and, as of June 2023, at least 16 producers offered a meat-based foie gras alternative. The resulting products do not conform to the French legal standard for "foie gras", but can be labeled "fatty goose liver" inside France. Outside France, they may be marked as "ethical foie gras" or "humane foie gras", although these terms also describe gavage-based foie gras production tempered by concern with the animal's welfare (e.g., feeding through rubber hoses instead of steel pipes).

These alternative methods are controversial, in part because substitutes for gavage do not produce the same results.

The current method, developed in Extremadura, Spain, involves timing the slaughter to coincide with the winter migration, when the livers naturally fatten. Prior to slaughter, the birds are allowed to eat freely, termed ad libitum. For this innovation, the producer, Patería de Sousa, won the Coup de Coeur award at the Salon International d'Alimentation 2006. Because gavage fattens goose livers to substantially larger than their natural size, de Sousa's technique is less efficient at producing a fixed mass of foie gras, and composes a small fraction of the market.

To achieve similar efficiency per mass to gavage, the British supermarket chain Waitrose sells a product which it calls faux gras (but see § Vegan alternatives), made from free-range British goose or duck liver blended with additional fat. Subsequently, researchers at the German Institute of Home Economics (DIL) and the company GMT developed a process to apply additional fat to duck liver meat at high pressure. Even trained chefs struggle to distinguish the result from traditional foie gras.

More radical approaches are possible. A duck or goose with damaged ventromedial nucleus in the hypothalamus will feel less satiety after eating and therefore eat more. In lesioning experiments, this effect more than doubled the bird's ad libitum food consumption. Alternatively, human microbiome studies on obesity led French researchers at Aviwell develop a probiotic preparation that produces fatty livers in geese over six months without gavage.

=== Vegan alternatives ===
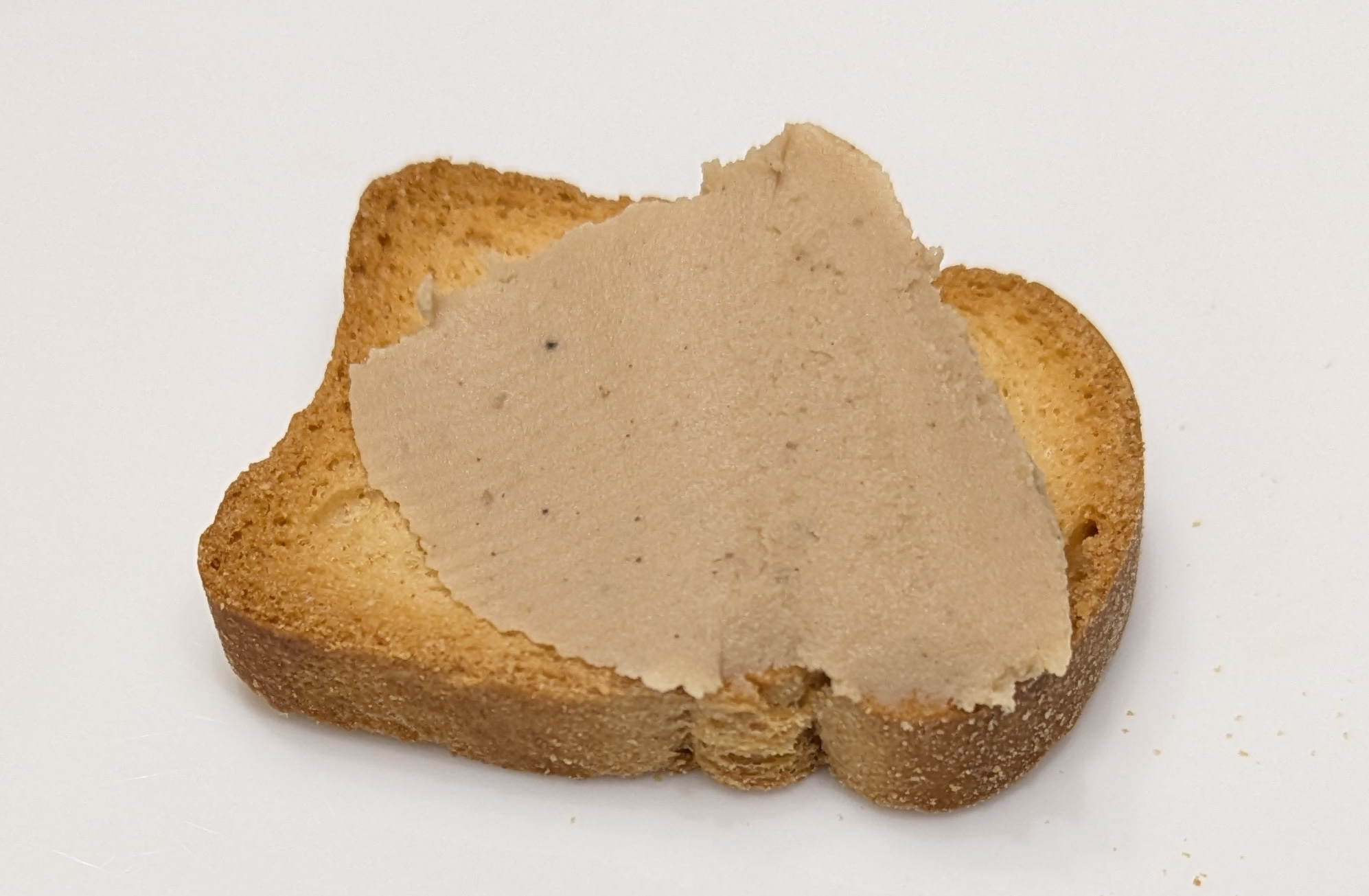
Vegan foie gras on a cracker

A Spanish company began selling a vegan alternative to foie gras called Fuah, in 2022. The product is made from cashew nuts, coconut oil, and beetroot. The American product Faux Gras is a vegan, nut-based spread. In June 2023, an animal welfare non-governmental organization found at least 14 producers of vegetarian or vegan alternatives to foie gras.

== Preparations ==
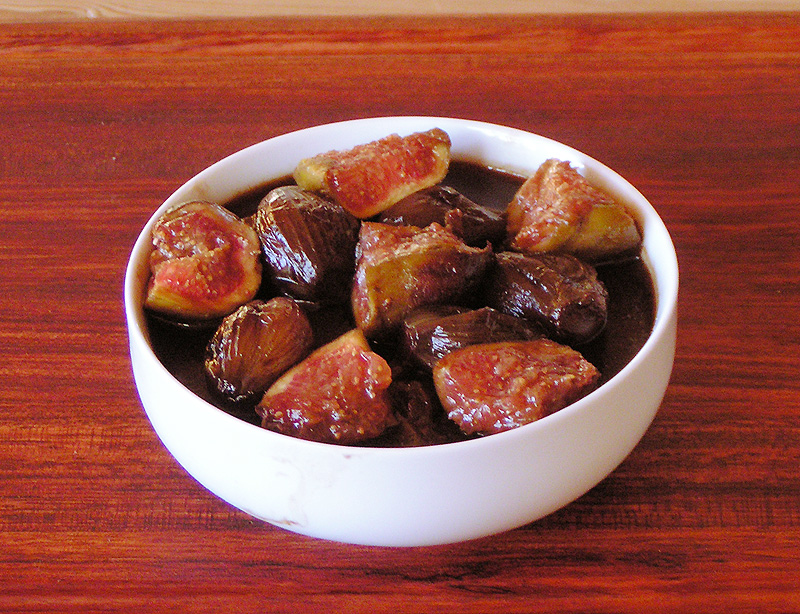
Foie gras with shallots and figs

Generally, French preparations of foie gras are made over low heat, as fat melts faster from the traditional goose foie gras than the duck foie gras produced in most other parts of the world. American and other New World preparations, typically employing duck foie gras, have more recipes and dish preparations for serving foie gras hot rather than cool or cold.

In Hungary, goose foie gras is traditionally fried in goose fat, which is then poured over the foie gras and left to cool; it is also eaten warm, after being fried or roasted, with some chefs smoking the foie gras over a cherry wood fire.

In other parts of the world, foie gras is served in dishes such as foie gras sushi rolls, in various forms of pasta or alongside steak tartare or atop a steak as a garnish.

=== Cold preparations ===
Traditional low-heat cooking methods result in terrines, pâtés, parfaits, foams, and mousses of foie gras, often flavored with truffle, mushrooms, or brandy such as cognac or armagnac. These slow-cooked forms of foie gras are cooled and served at or below room temperature.

In a very traditional form of terrine, au torchon ("in a towel"), a whole lobe of foie is molded, wrapped in a towel and slow-cooked in a bain-marie. For added flavor (from the Maillard reaction), the liver may be seared briefly over a fire of grape vine clippings (sarments) before slow-cooking in a bain-marie; afterwards, it is pressed and served cold, in slices.

Raw foie gras is also cured in salt ("cru au sel") and served slightly chilled.

=== Strasbourg pie ===
A pastry containing fatty goose liver and other ingredients is known as the "Strasburg pie" since Strasbourg was a major producer of foie gras.

The Strasburg pie is mentioned in William Makepeace Thackeray's novel Vanity Fair as being popular with the diplomatic corps.

T. S. Eliot's poem "The Ad-Dressing of Cats", part of Old Possum's Book of Practical Cats and also the last song in its musical adaptation Cats, contains the line "And you might now and then supply/Some caviar or Strasbourg pie".

A Strasburg pie is enjoyed in two of the novels in Patrick O'Brian's Aubrey/Maturin series. Captain Aubrey and his officers find one a welcome addition to an otherwise sub-par dinner in The Far Side of the World, and he and Dr. Maturin also share one in The Letter of Marque.

=== Hot preparations ===
Pâté de foie gras, canned
Nutritional value per 100 g (3.5 oz)
- Energy: 1,933 kJ (462 kcal)
- Carbohydrates: 4.67 g
- Dietary fiber: 0.0 g
- Fat: 43.84 g
- Protein: 11.40 g
Vitamins and minerals
Vitamins	Quantity %DV^{†}
Vitamin A equiv.	111% 1001 μg
Thiamine (B1)	7% 0.088 mg
Riboflavin (B2)	23% 0.299 mg
Niacin (B3)	16% 2.51 mg
Minerals	Quantity %DV^{†}
Sodium	30% 697 mg
- ^{†}Percentages estimated using US recommendations for adults.

Given the increased internationalization of cuisines and food supply, foie gras is increasingly found in hot preparations in the United States, France, and elsewhere. Duck foie gras ("foie gras de canard") has a slightly lower fat content and is generally more suitable in texture to cooking at high temperatures than goose foie gras ("foie gras d'oie"), but chefs have been able to cook goose foie gras employing similar techniques developed for duck, albeit with more care.

Raw foie gras can be roasted, sauteed, pan-seared (poêlé), or (with care and attention) grilled. As foie gras has high-fat content, contact with heat needs to be brief and, therefore, at a high temperature, lest it burns or melts. Optimal structural integrity for searing requires the foie gras to be cut to a thickness between 15 and 25 mm (½ – 1 inch), resulting in a rare, uncooked center. Some chefs prefer not to devein the foie gras, as the veins can help preserve the integrity of the fatty liver. It is increasingly common to sear the foie gras on one side only, leaving the other side uncooked. Practitioners of molecular gastronomy such as Heston Blumenthal of The Fat Duck restaurant first flash-freeze foie gras in liquid nitrogen as part of the preparation process.

Hot foie gras requires minimal spices, typically black pepper, paprika (in Hungary) and salt. Chefs have used fleur de sel as a gourmet seasoning for hot foie gras to add an "important textural accent" with its crunch.

=== Consumption ===
Foie gras is regarded as a gourmet luxury dish. In France, it is mainly consumed on special occasions, such as Christmas or New Year's Eve réveillon dinners, though the recent increased availability of foie gras has made it a less exceptional dish. In some areas of France, foie gras is eaten year-round.

Duck foie gras is the slightly cheaper and, since a change of production methods in the 1950s to battery, by far the most common kind, particularly in the US. The taste of duck foie gras is often referred to as musky with a subtle bitterness. Goose foie gras is noted as less gamey and smoother, with a more delicate flavour.

== Animal abuse ==
World laws on foie gras production: Countries and regions that ban foie gras production / Main foie gras-producing countries and regions

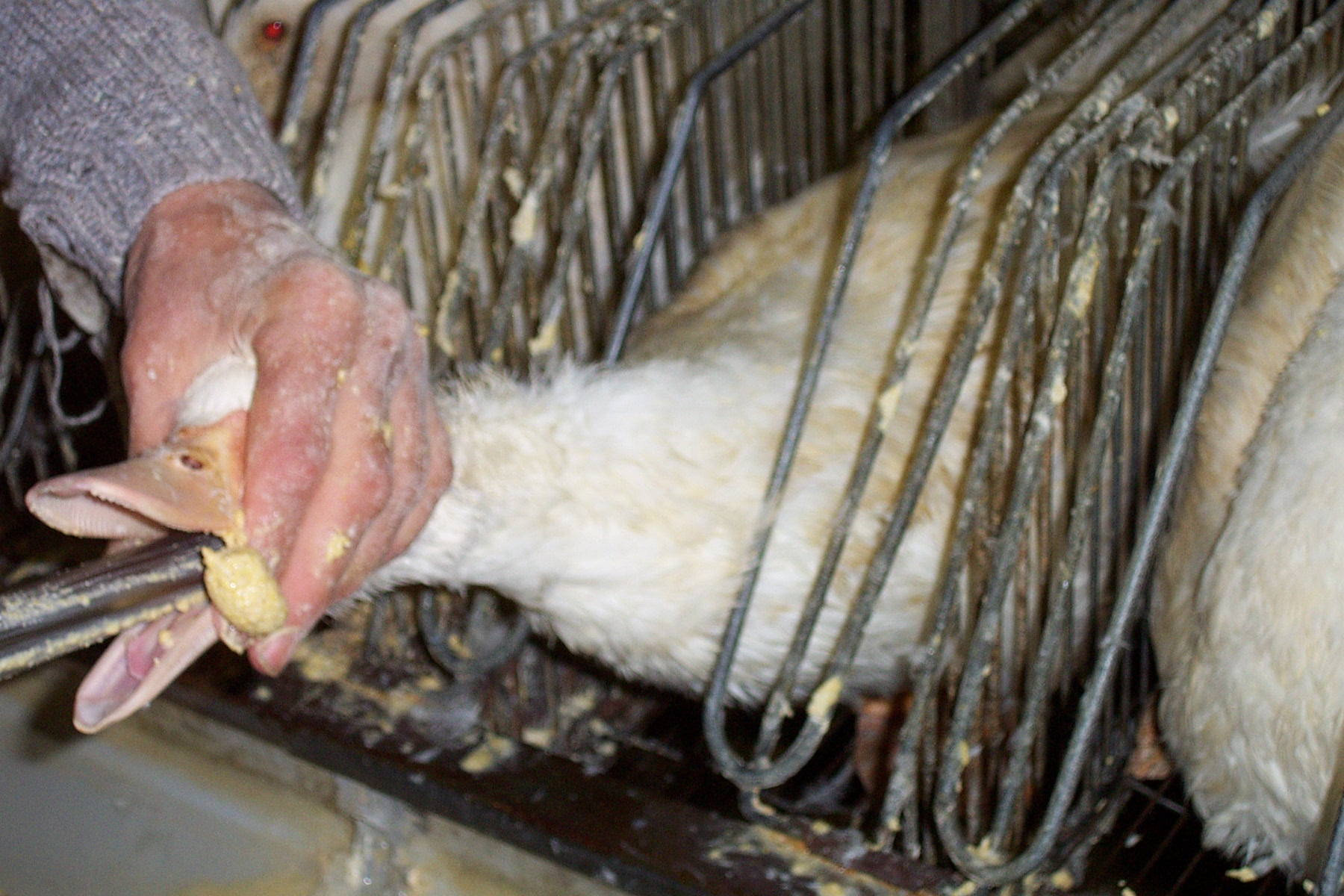
Gavage feeding

Gavage-based foie gras production is controversial due to the animal welfare consequences of the force-feeding procedure, intensive housing and husbandry, an enlarged liver and the potential for being detrimental to human health. Some countries find foie gras to be "morally objectionable". One EU committee report noted that up to 1998, there was only a small number of scientific studies on the welfare of birds used for foie gras production; however, the Committee found sufficient evidence to conclude that "force-feeding, as currently practised, is detrimental to the welfare of the birds". The industry repeatedly faces accusations of torture and cruelty.

=== Suitability of breeds and species ===
The production of foie gras occurs on the argument that migrating wildfowl seasonally eat such that their liver naturally enlarges. However, the bird used predominantly in foie gras production is a hybrid of a male Muscovy duck and a female Pekin duck. It has been noted that the Muscovy duck is non-migratory, and both the Pekin and the mulard hybrid cannot fly. Domestic ducks (including the Pekin) are derived from the mallard duck, which is sometimes migratory and sometimes not. Therefore, although the domestic goose might be adapted to store food before migration, it is less likely that the Mulard hybrid duck has the same potential.

=== Force-feeding procedure ===
==== Fear ====
Geese and ducks show avoidance behaviour (indicating aversion) toward the person who feeds them and the feeding procedure. The AVMA (Animal Welfare Division) when considering foie gras production stated "The relatively new Mulard breed used in foie gras production seems to be more prone than its parent breeds to fear of people". Although in 1998 the EU Scientific Committee on Animal Health and Animal Welfare reported seeing this aversion, they noted that at the time, there was no "conclusive" scientific evidence on the aversive nature of force-feeding.

==== Injury ====
That same EU Scientific Committee also reported that there was usually clear evidence of tissue damage in the esophagus of birds which had been gavage fed, although one 1972 study cited by the report observed no alteration of the esophageal tissue. More recent scientific studies have shown that the esophagus of birds can be injured or inflamed by gavage feeding.

==== Stress ====
After measuring a range of physiological parameters in male Mulard ducks, it was concluded in one study that the acute stress caused by force-feeding is similar at the beginning and end of the commercial production of foie gras. A similar study on Muscovy ducks found that gavage feeding was related to an increase in panting behaviour and serum corticosterone levels, indicating increased stress attributable to this feeding method.

=== Housing and husbandry ===
In France, at the end of 2015, individual cages were prohibited to improve animal welfare. They were to be replaced by cages housing 4 to 5 birds.

==== Behavioural restriction ====
During the force-feeding period, the birds are kept in individual cages with wire or plastic mesh floors or sometimes in small groups on slatted floors. Individual caging restricts movements and behaviours by preventing the birds from standing erect, turning around, or flapping their wings. Birds cannot carry out other natural waterfowl behaviours, such as bathing and swimming. Ducks and geese are social animals, and individual cages prevent such interactions. According to a 2023 European food safety authority (EFSA) report, even the collective cages and pens currently in use in Europe do not offer enough space to the birds for them to express their natural behaviour.

During the force-feeding period, when the birds are not being fed, they are sometimes kept in near-darkness; this prevents normal investigatory behaviour and results in poor welfare.

==== Injury ====
Lesions can occur on the sternum of the birds due to necrosis of the skin. This is observed more frequently in birds reared in cages rather than on the floor. The prevalence is higher in Mulard ducks (40–70%) compared to under 6% in Muscovy ducks. This is due to the larger pectoralis profundus major and minor muscles in Muscovy ducks compared to Mulards. The relatively new Mulard breed used in foie gras production seems more prone to developing lesions in the area of the sternum when kept in small cages and to bone breakage during transport and slaughter.

Where ducks are fattened in group pens, it has been suggested that the increased effort required to capture and restrain ducks in pens might cause them to experience more stress during force-feeding. Injuries and fatalities during transport and slaughter occur in all types of poultry production; fattened ducks are more susceptible to conditions such as heat stress.

=== Enlarged liver ===
Foie gras production results in the bird's liver being swollen. In some ducks, liver size changes seasonally, increasing by as much as 30% to 50%, with more pronounced changes in females. However, foie gras production enlarges the livers ten times their normal size. This impairs liver function due to the obstruction of blood flow and expands the abdomen, making it difficult for the birds to breathe. Death occurs if the force-feeding is continued.

=== Mortality rates ===
The mortality rate in force-fed birds varies from 2% to 4%, compared with approximately 0.2% in age-matched, non-force-fed drakes. Mortality rates do not differ between the force-feeding period and the previous rearing phase, with both being approximately 2.5%.

== Controversy ==
The controversial nature of foie gras production was identified in a paper that juxtaposed the views of "foie gras production as the apotheosis of murderous meat production, and those who consider it to be a co-production between humans and animals".

Animal rights and welfare advocates such as Animal Equality, PETA, Viva!, the Humane Society of the United States, and FOUR PAWS contend that foie gras production methods, and force-feeding in particular, constitute cruel treatment of animals.

An Ipsos MORI poll found that 63% of the UK population would like to see a complete ban on the sale of foie gras in the UK.

In 2011 and 2012, Animal Equality conducted investigations inside four foie gras farms in France and five in Spain, exposing the cruelty of force-feeding. The footage collected reveals ducks covered in blood with broken and torn beaks, birds kept in small metal cages with no room to turn around, and ducks and geese desperately struggling to avoid force-feeding.

In April–May 2013, an investigator from Mercy for Animals recorded an undercover video at Hudson Valley Foie Gras farm in New York state. The footage showed workers forcefully pushing tubes down ducks' throats. One worker said of the force-feeding process: "Sometimes the duck doesn't get up, and it dies. There have been times that 20 ducks were killed." Hudson Valley operations manager Marcus Henley replied that the farm's mortality statistics are not above average for the poultry industry. Because Hudson Valley provides foie gras to Amazon.com, Mercy for Animals began a campaign urging Amazon to stop selling foie gras, a move that has already been made by Costco, Safeway, and Target.

In November 2013, the Daily Mirror published a report based on the video they obtained depicting cruelty towards ducks in a farm owned by French firm Ernest Soulard, which is a supplier to celebrity chef Gordon Ramsay's restaurants. The restaurant chain suspended purchasing from the supplier following the exposé.

=== Animal research ===
The process of force-feeding can make animals sick by stressing the liver. If the stress is prolonged, excess protein may build up and clump together as amyloids, consumption of which has been found to induce amyloidosis in laboratory mice. It has been hypothesized this may be a route of transmission in humans too, and so may be a risk for people with inflammatory complaints such as rheumatoid arthritis.

=== Legislation and bans ===
Several countries and regions have laws against force-feeding or the sale or importation of foie gras; even where it is legal, some retailers have ceased selling it.

In Switzerland, foie gras production has been prohibited since 1978 and force-feeding is explicitly banned since 2008.

In the European Union, force-feeding is only legal in 5 of the 27 member states: France, Belgium, Hungary, Bulgaria, and Spain. In 2017, foie gras production was banned in Brussels, a largely symbolic measure because of the small number of producers within the city limits.

In 2019, New York City instituted a foie gras ban but was struck down in 2022 by an order from the New York's Agriculture and Markets Department. However, the court ruling against New York City's foie gras ban has been overturned in 2026.

In November 2022, the Buckingham Palace household wrote to the PETA campaign group that foie gras was not bought or served in royal residences.

Force-feeding is also prohibited in Israel, Turkey, Australia, and Brazil. Foie gras import is prohibited in India. Foie gras production and sale is prohibited in California.

== See also ==
- List of delicacies
- List of duck dishes
- Nonalcoholic fatty liver disease, with homologous pathophysiologic aspects
- Ortolan bunting
- Shen Zhu – the fattening of pigs in a manner similar to gavage
- Specialty foods
