= Animal Protection and Rescue League =

American animal rights organization

- Founded: 2003; 23 years ago
- Founder: Kath Rogers and Bryan Pease
- Type: Nonprofit
- Legal status: 501(c)(3)
- Purpose: Animal rights
- Location(s): San Diego and Orange Counties, California, United States
- Website: www.aprl.org

The Animal Protection and Rescue League (APRL) is an American grassroots animal rights organization, founded in 2003, based in California's San Diego and Orange Counties.

APRL was founded in San Diego by animal rights activists Bryan Pease and Kath Rogers as a 501(c)(3) nonprofit national organization. Subsequently, the Orange County chapter of APRL was formed in Irvine California and is staffed entirely by volunteers that follow the same mission of animal rights as the national organization.

== Activities and campaigns ==
=== Thrift store ===
The APRL thrift store was founded in February 2006. All proceeds from the store went to campaigns and programs to help animals through the Animal Protection and Rescue League. On July 9, 2017, the APRL Thrift Store closed, after a 10-year run as a nonprofit small business.

=== Cruelty-free eating ===
Through APRL's GO VEGAN, College Outreach, and Vegan Outreach campaigns, volunteers distribute pamphlets to spread the word about the benefits of a plant-based diet to patrons at popular gathering spots like Downtown Disney, Knott's Berry Farm, The Outlets at Orange, the Irvine Spectrum, swap meets and college campuses. The organization estimates that for every 200 pamphlets distributed, one person goes vegan. That's 100 animals saved per year, or thousands over the course of a new vegan's life. APRL has given out hundreds of thousands of pamphlets and through this alone, they claim to have saved millions of animals' lives.

=== SoCal VegFest ===
The SoCal VegFest is run by dedicated volunteers as a project of Animal Protection and Rescue League. SoCal VegFest is a yearly event, normally in mid-fall, designed to engage curiosity and inspire consciousness in people of all ages. The event includes free plant-based food samplings, musical entertainment, guest speakers, cooking demonstrations, raffles, interactive booths, food vendors, humane organizations, an enjoyable children's area with a variety of engaging opportunities especially for kids, and more. The purpose of SoCal VegFest is to introduce Southern Californians and others to the benefits of healthy conscious living. Their stated goal is to inspire and support anyone who wants to learn more about living a more healthy, environmentally friendly, and compassionate life.

=== Ban foie gras ===
APRL's Stop Foie Gras campaign has released groundbreaking video footage of extreme cruelty from all three foie gras farms in the U.S. and several in France. APRL was instrumental in passing legislation in California and Chicago against this cruelty.

=== Prevention of Farm Animal Cruelty ===
APRL is a member of Californians for Humane Farms, a coalition of animal protection groups working to pass the Prevention of Farm Animal Cruelty Act—an initiative that will appear on California's November 2008 ballot. APRL led the signature gathering phase of the Yes on Proposition 2 (Prevention of Farm Animal Cruelty Act) campaign in Southern California. In 2017, APRL took part in the signature gathering phase of the updated Prevention of Farm Animal Cruelty Act.

=== The GO VEGAN billboard campaign ===
APRL erected two billboards on December 30, 2014, next to the I-5 freeway in Los Angeles. Together, APRL estimates, they are getting 300,000 impressions per day, or 2 million impressions per week. It would be great to keep them up longer and move them around to increase their exposure. The Orange County chapter of Animal Protection & Rescue League (with assistance from PETA, which provided a generous grant) spent most of its annual budget already on the billboards and lacks the funds to keep them up.

=== Orange County beach cleanup ===
To protect marine animals from ingesting plastics and debris, which causes grave harm, APRL organizes monthly beach cleanups. They supply buckets, trash bags, gloves, reach extending sticks, and sanitizing wipes for volunteers to cleanup the Southern California beaches. Volunteers are asked to help clean up the beaches in the morning. Then at noon have a vegan lunch.

=== Protesting animals used in entertainment ===
APRL protests rodeos, bull riding, animal circuses, sea world, and elephant rides. They work with local government to end the use of exotic animals and end all cruel practices at fairs and zoos.

=== Aide companion animals ===
APRL save strays, educates about spaying and neutering pets, and promote pet adoption to reduce killing in the wild and in shelters. APRL has gotten many OC cities to ban the retail sale of dogs and cats and many pet stores to closes after advocacy and protest campaigns.

=== Helping the Catalina Harbor cats ===
There is a colony of more than 30 feral cats living in the rugged landscape of Catalina ("Cat") Harbor on Catalina Island. Some of the cats have sustained permanent injuries from attacks by humans and dogs. APRL started a fundraising campaign to provide needed services such as food, shelter, and medical aid.

=== Opposition to kapparot ===
APRL protested killing of kapparot chickens and sought legal actions.

=== Grant program ===
Some of the other organizations APRL has supported:

- Animal Outlook (formerly Compassion Over Killing)
- Project Wildlife
- Vegan Outreach
- Synergy Animal Rescue

== Legal advocacy ==
=== Animal Protection and Rescue League et al. v. The State of California et al. ===
Injunction was filed March 10, 2008.

- An injunction was granted to place a guideline rope on the La Jolla Children's pool beach to protect seals and their pups until May 30, 2008.

== See also ==
- Animal protection
- Animal rescue group
- List of animal rights advocates
- List of animal rights groups
- Mercy for Animals
- PETA
- Veganism

== Further info ==
- "California Law Bans Production, Sale of Foie Gras". www.upc-online.org.
- "Mmmm... cruely". 7 December 2005.
- "La Jolla Children's Pool Rope Meant To Protect Seals Removed Today". 15 May 2012.
- "7 Awesome Cities That Have Taken a Stand Against Puppy Mills - One Green Planet". www.onegreenplanet.org. 30 July 2014.
- "Group seeks indictment of former OC Animal Control officers who 'barbarically' slit deer's throat". 17 April 2015.
- "Woman who seeks memorial says she values humans and fish". 1 November 2012.
