= Papillon (card game) =

French card game

- Early French fishing game
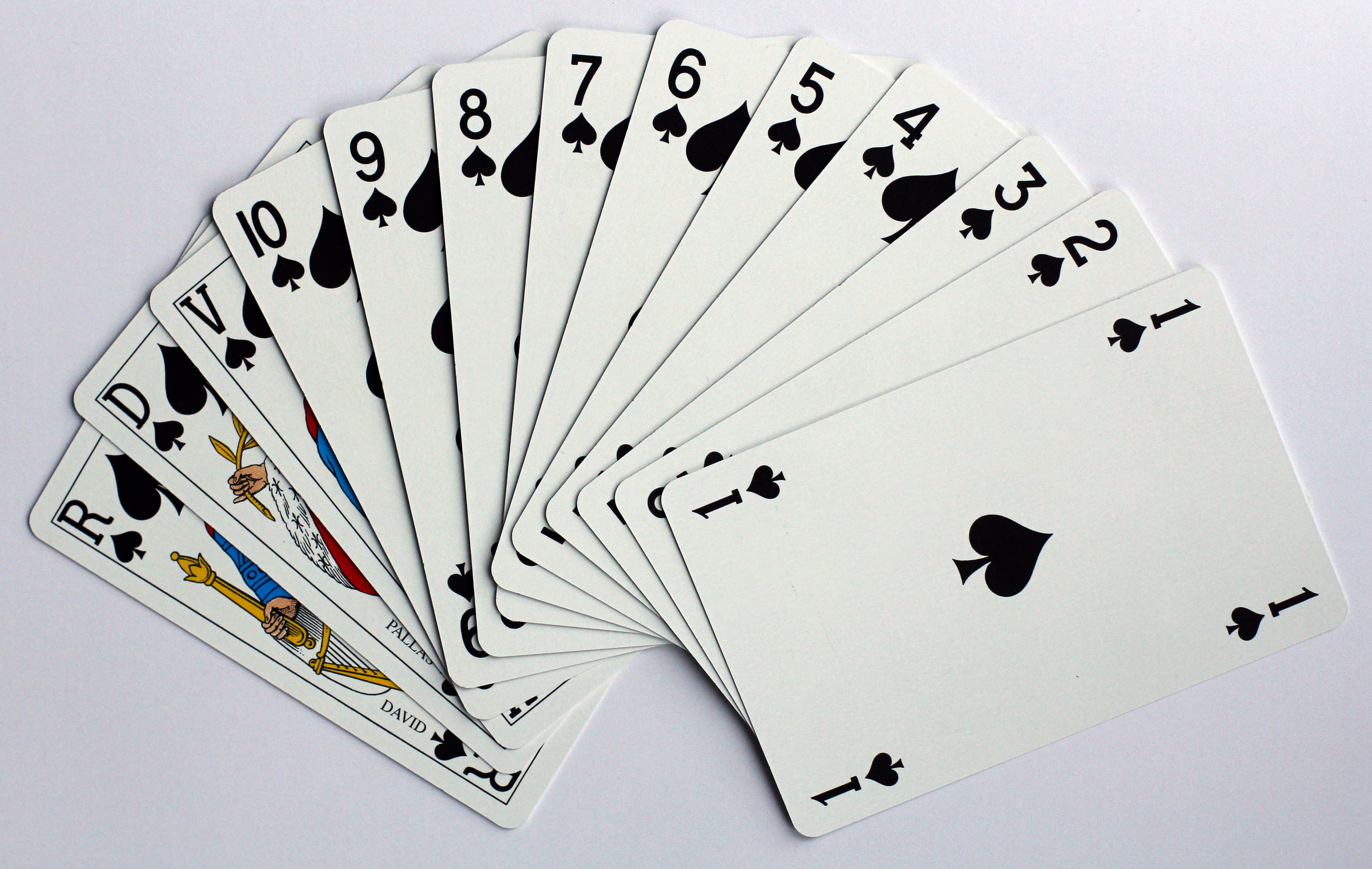
- Suit of Spades from a Paris pattern pack
- Origin: France
- Type: Fishing
- Players: 3–4 (3 best)
- Cards: 52
- Deck: Paris pattern, French-suited
- Play: Anticlockwise

Related games
- Culbas

Papillon (French: "butterfly") is an old French card game of the fishing type for three or four players. It has been described as "perfect for children who know how to count".

== History ==
Papillon an early European fishing game, its rules first appearing in the 1730 Académie Universelle des Jeux where it is described as a novelty. It was a favourite game of the French king, Louis XVI (1754–1793). It may have been a development of the older, simpler game of Cul-bas.

Papillon is also known as Hanneton ("chafer") and Sauterelle ("grasshopper") after two of its bonus-earning feats.

== Overview ==
Papillon is a card game of the fishing type, best played by three, although four players may also play. The aim is to score points by being the first to shed all one's cards after the talon ("stock") is exhausted and through achieving certain bonus-earning feats during play.

== Equipment ==
A standard 52-card pack of French-suited cards is used. Suits are irrelevant and the cards have matching values. The courts – King, Queen and Knave – are worth 10 points each, while the pip cards are worth their face value. The game is played using counters called jetons and fiches to keep score.

== Preliminaries ==
Each player is given 12 fiches and 20 jetons, whereby 1 fiche = 20 jetons. A bank of spare jetons is held in case players run out. At the start of each deal, players ante a fiche to the pot in the form of a dish or small basket. This stake or pool (French: poule) is competed for during the game and may increase in size. Players agree how many rounds will be played, each round comprising three deals.

== Deal ==
The cards are fanned, face down, and each player draws one; the player with the highest card (Kings high, Aces low) deals first. The dealer shuffles the pack, offers it to the left for cutting and then deals 3 cards each, individually, beginning with first hand (left of dealer). The dealer then deals 7 more cards, face up, in a tableau to the table before stacking the remainder face down as a talon.

== Play ==
First hand sits to the right of the dealer and plays first, play then continuing anticlockwise. In their turn, players may:

- Play a single card using it to capture a table card of the same rank
- Play a single card in order to capture a combination of table cards whose total matches that of the played card
- Play 3 cards of the same rank in order to capture the one remaining card of the quartet on the table.

The played card together with the cards so captured form a trick which the player places face down to one side.

There are several bonus earning feats during the game:

- Hanneton ("cockchafer" or "beetle"). A player captures three table cards of the same rank having the fourth in hand.
- Sauterelle ("grasshopper"). A player sweeps all the table cards leaving none for the next player, who must then trail all cards held in the hand. If the last player with cards in hand makes a sweep when there are still cards in the talon, the dealer deals the next batch of 3 cards each and it is always the player to the right of the one who made the sweep who must trail the hand dealt.
- Petit Papillon ("little butterfly"). A player sheds all hand cards by making a trick while there are still cards in the talon. A player who makes a petit papillon drops out of the play until the next redistribution of cards from the talon, but is not exempt from settling any bonus payments due to the other players e.g. for capturing Aces.

A player unable to do any of the above, including the situation where someone has just made a sauterelle (sweep - see below), must trail all hand cards face up on the tableau and wait for the rest to empty their hands.

When all players have exhausted their hands by capturing cards or trailing, the dealer deals 3 more cards each from the talon in the same manner as before. Once the talon is down to 9 cards, the dealer must notify everyone so they know that the talon will be exhausted next time round.

== Winning ==
The winner of the deal is the first player to empty his or her hand by taking a trick after the talon has been exhausted. This is called a papillon ("butterfly") and the player sweeps the pool. If more than one player is able to do this in succession, the winner will be the one with positional priority in the order: dealer, second hand, first hand. The winner adds the remaining table cards to the tricks already taken; otherwise the last to have taken a trick claims them. If none of the players is able to get rid of their cards at the end of the deal, it is a draw.

At the end of the agreed number of rounds the player with the most points in counters wins the game. If there is still a pool, then either the game continues until a player makes papillon or players may agree that the pool is shared out.

== Scoring ==
The feats below earn jetons as shown. With the exception of a papillon which is paid from the pot, these are paid to the player scoring the bonus by each opponent.

- Capturing an Ace with a card other than an Ace - 1
- Capturing an Ace with an Ace from the hand - 2
- Capturing 2 Aces with a Two from the hand - 4
- Capturing 3 Aces with a Three from the hand - 6
- Capturing 4 Aces with a Four from the hand - 8
- For each Ace held at the end - 1
- For each Ace trailed to the tableau – 1
- Most cards at the end of the deal – 1. If there is a tie, there is no payment, but the player with most cards in the next deal earns double.
- Consolation. If there is no winner at the end of a deal, the last to trail their cards receives a 'consolation' of 1
- Hanneton – 1
- Sauterelle – 1
- Petit Papillon – 1
- Papillon – the pool (the contents of the pot)

In addition a player who is forced to trail must pay 1 jeton to the pool per card trailed.

== Modern rules ==
Modern rules largely follow the above, but have a much simplified scoring system e.g.:

- Each player antes 1 or 2 jetons to the pot (corbeille = "basket")
- Each card trailed (except Aces): 1 jeton to the pot
- Each Ace trailed: 1 jeton paid by each opponent to the player
- Papillon: wins and sweeps the pot or, if no-one achieves this
- Most cards: wins and sweeps the pot

The petit papillon is mentioned by Gerver but not scored.

== Four-hand Papillon ==
During the deal, the dealer only lays 4 upcards on the table as the tableau. Otherwise the rules are the same as for the three player game.

== Bibliography ==
- _ (1725). Académie Universelle des Jeux, Paris: Legras.
- _ (1798). Sporting Magazine. London: Wheble.
- Droulhiole, Michel (2007). Comment Jouer (et Gagner) à Tous Les Jeux de Cartes. Paris: Leduc. ISBN 978-2-84899-161-0
- Gerver, Frans (1966). le guide marabout de tous les jeux de cartes. Verviers: Gérard.
- Parlett, David (1991). A History of Card Games. Oxford, New York: OUP.
- Parlett, David (2008), The Penguin Book of Card Games, London: Penguin, ISBN 978-0-141-03787-5
