= John Papillon (cricketer) =

English cricketer and cleric

John Papillon (30 December 1806 – 20 October 1889) was an English cleric, and a cricketer with amateur status. He was associated with Oxford University and made his debut in 1827.

Papillon was educated at Winchester College and then at University College, Oxford, where he matriculated in 1825, and graduated B.A. in 1828. He became a Church of England priest and was rector of Bonnington, Kent, 1831–41 and of Lexden, Essex, from 1841 until his death.

== Bibliography ==
- Haygarth, Arthur (1996) [1862]. Scores & Biographies, Volume 1 (1744–1826). Kennington: Frederick Lillywhite. ISBN 978-19-00592-23-9.
- Haygarth, Arthur (1997) [1862]. Scores & Biographies, Volume 2 (1827–1840). Kennington: Frederick Lillywhite. ISBN 978-19-00592-23-9.
