= Stephen Victor Wilson =

American judge (born 1941)

Judge of the United States District Court for the Central District of California
- Incumbent
- Assumed office October 17, 1985
- Appointed by: Ronald Reagan
- Preceded by: Seat established by 98 Stat. 333

Personal details
- Born: March 26, 1941 (age 85) New York City, U.S.
- Education: Lehigh University (BA); Brooklyn Law School (JD); George Washington University (LLM)

Stephen Victor Wilson (born March 26, 1941) is a United States district judge of the United States District Court for the Central District of California.

== Education and career ==
Wilson received a Bachelor of Arts degree from Lehigh University in 1963. He received a Juris Doctor from Brooklyn Law School in 1967. He received a Master of Laws from George Washington University Law School in 1973. He was a trial attorney of the Tax Division of the United States Department of Justice from 1968 to 1971. He was an Assistant United States Attorney of Los Angeles, California from 1971 to 1977. He was the Chief of the Fraud and Special Prosecutions Section from 1973 to 1977. He was in private practice of law in Beverly Hills, California from 1977 to 1985. He was an adjunct professor of law at Loyola Law School from 1975 to 1979. He was the Chairman of the Federal Indigent Defense Panel Committee of the District Court in Los Angeles from 1979 to 1980. He was an adjunct professor of law at the University of San Diego School of Law in 1984.

=== Federal judicial service ===
Wilson was nominated by President Ronald Reagan on September 9, 1985, to the United States District Court for the Central District of California, to a new seat created by Pub. L. No. 98-353, 98 Stat. 333 (1984). He was confirmed by the United States Senate on October 16, 1985, and received his commission on October 17, 1985.

=== Notable cases ===
In 1988, Wilson threw out provisions of a 1952 immigration law that the government used to deport aliens who advocate world communism. He also presided over the 2002 case of Sherman Austin.

== See also ==
- List of United States federal judges by longevity of service

Legal offices
Preceded by Seat established by 98 Stat. 333	Judge of the United States District Court for the Central District of California; 1985–present	Incumbent
