= Roman goose =

Breed of goose

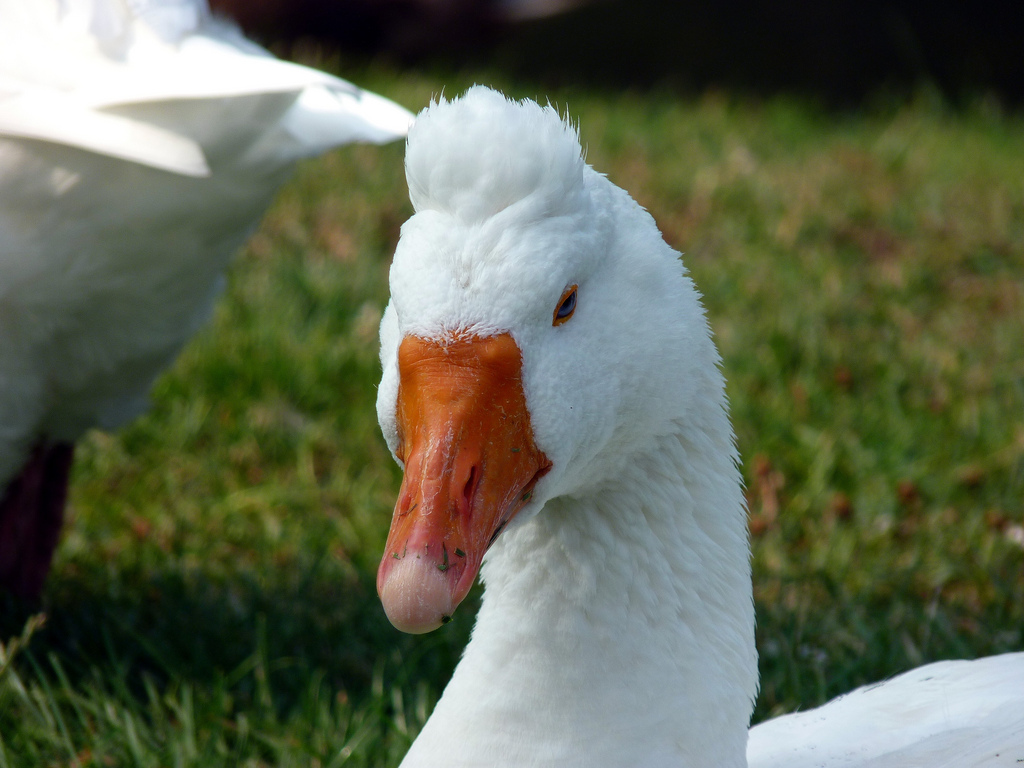
Roman tufted goose

The Roman goose is an Italian breed of domestic goose. It is said to be one of the oldest breeds of goose, bred more than 2000 years ago and originally sacred to the goddess Juno.

These are a lightweight, smaller breed of geese with a tuft of feathers on their head. They are either solid white or spotted white and brown.

== History ==
Sometime in the early 4th century BC, as the Gauls attempted to sneak into Rome under cover of night, it is said that the honking of Roman geese alerted the Romans and saved the capitol. In honour of this, the Romans later founded a temple to Juno, to whom the geese were considered sacred. Geese were also revered in the supplicia canum annual sacrifice.

== Description ==
These are a lightweight, smaller breed of geese with a tuft of feathers on their head. These geese are only admitted if they are solid white. No marking is allowed for them to be considered Roman Tuft. Roman Tuft consist of solid white, but some can have brown or tan spots. They show rosy pink beaks and feet or red-orange. All have bright-blue eyes. The goose is of medium length and weight and generally long neck. Roman tuft are a generally docile breed and good watch-geese.

=== Uses ===
In the modern period, it is kept for a range of purposes such as for meat and eggs depending on location. It is a popular exhibition breed in North America, where it is more commonly known as the tufted Roman goose and possesses a crest. In Europe, it is primarily kept as a utility meat breed, while in Australia, they are used for both purposes. Crests are optional in Europe and Australia. The breed has also been recommended as a guard goose.

=== Eggs ===
Roman geese can live up to 25 years and lay between 25 and 35 eggs per year. An egg takes 28 to 30 days for incubation. If you continuously take their eggs they will lay more than the average amount.

These geese will begin to lay early spring. During this time the head gander will become aggressive.

=== Showing ===
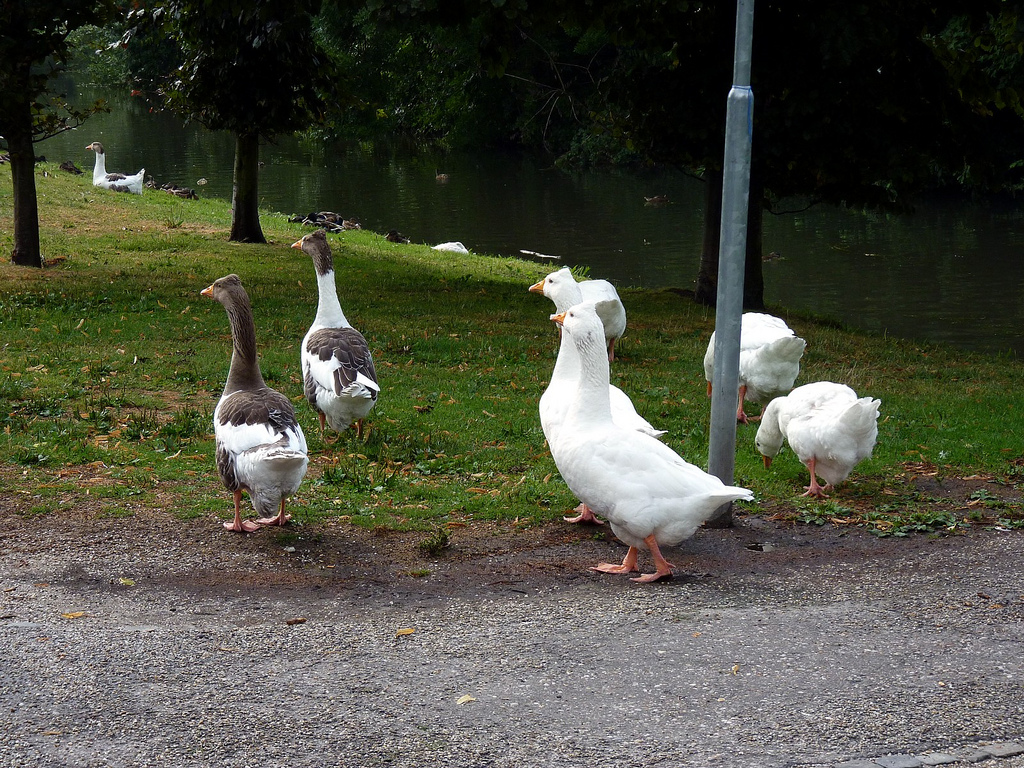
Roman Tufted Geese

Tufted Roman geese are also bred for showing. In shows, Roman geese with clean, pure white feathers and a large paunch are preferred, while red feet and red beaks are disfavored. Females have larger paunches, especially during laying season.

== See also ==
- Guard goose
- List of goose breeds
