= Guard goose =

Goose used as a guard animal

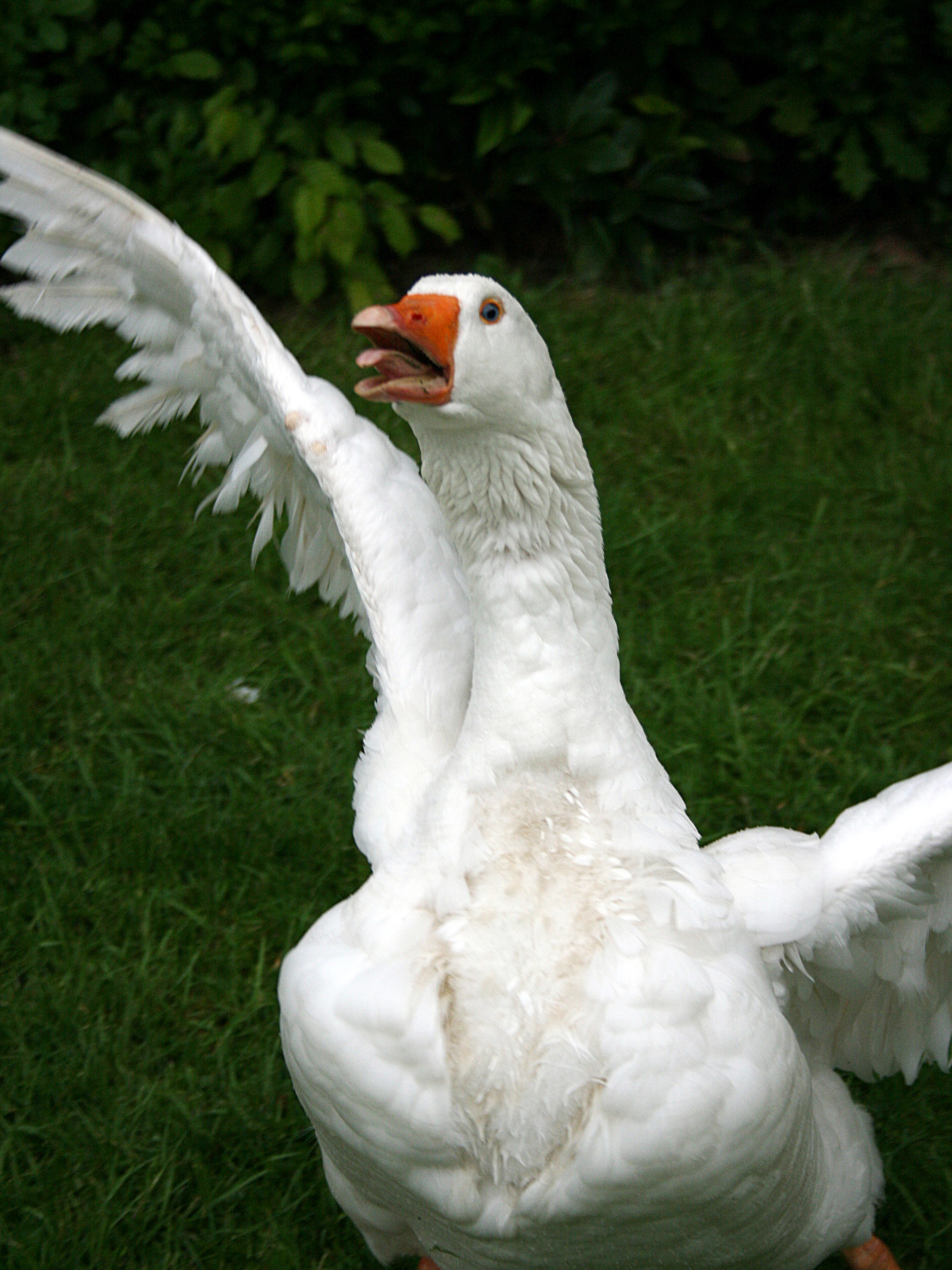
An Emden goose displaying aggression

The guard goose, is a domestic goose that is used as a guard animal, both on farms and in other situations.

== Goose behavior ==
Geese are considered to have excellent eyesight, and to be "watchful and inquisitive", with strong territorial instincts. Goose attacks on humans are commonly reported. One case in 2001 set a legal precedent, resulting in a workers' compensation payout of over $17,000 for an injured delivery person, the first Illinois worker’s compensation claim due to wildlife. In another case, several geese protecting their goslings knocked a man off his bicycle, resulting in hospitalization. One Buffalo, New York resident claimed over $2 million in damages for a goose attack while on a neighbor's property. At times, park rangers have killed entire flocks of aggressive geese.

Canada geese in Cincinnati parks have been responsible for knocking people down and breaking their bones. And they have been called "spitting, hissing, biting attack missiles".

The same aggressive, territorial behaviour can be utilized in the guard capacity. As geese are intelligent enough to discern unusual people or sounds from usual stimuli, their loud honking will alert humans when the geese are alarmed.

== History of use ==
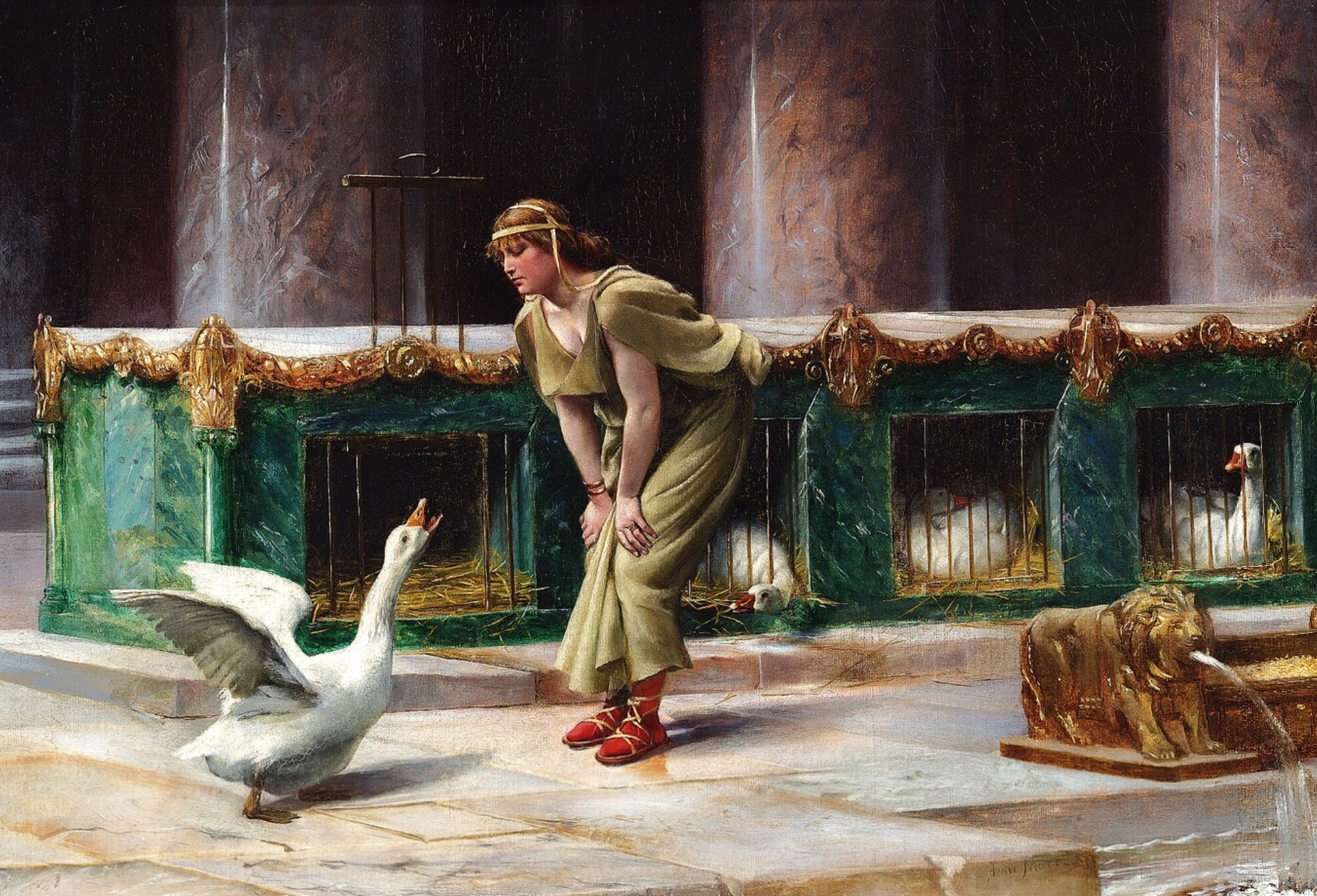
The geese of the Capitol by Henri-Paul Motte, 1889

Guard geese have been used throughout history, and in modern times. In ancient Rome, geese are credited by the historian Livy for giving the alarm when Gauls invaded (see Battle of the Allia). Geese were subsequently revered in the supplicia canum annual sacrifice, and the Romans later founded a temple to Juno, to whom the geese were considered sacred.

On modern farms, geese are said to be good deterrents to predators of other domestic fowl, and against snakes. A 2006 handbook on industrial security recommends them for protecting warehouses and other isolated physical assets. They are reported to have been used to guard United States Air Defense Command installations in Germany; as the Scotch Watch at Ballantine's Distillery in Dumbarton, Scotland; and to protect a police station in Xinjiang, China.

Due to their tendency to make noise when approached by strangers, about 500 geese were used to supplement dogs, drones, and humans to patrol the 533 km (331 mi) boundary between Chongzuo and Vietnam during the COVID-19 pandemic. An official commented that the birds, one of the most common livestock in the region, are sensitive to sounds and can sometimes be more aggressive than dogs.

Guard geese are utilized to monitor the fence at prisons in Brazil for incursions because of their low cost and the fact that they don't respond to food bribes like dogs.

== Breeds ==
A publication by the United States Department of Agriculture lists the African goose, Roman goose (Tufted Roman), Pomeranian goose (Saddleback Pomeranian), and Chinese goose as the best breeds for guard duty. Chinese geese are said to be loud, and African geese both loud and large.

== See also ==
- Guard dog
- Guard llama
