= Henri-Paul Motte =

French painter

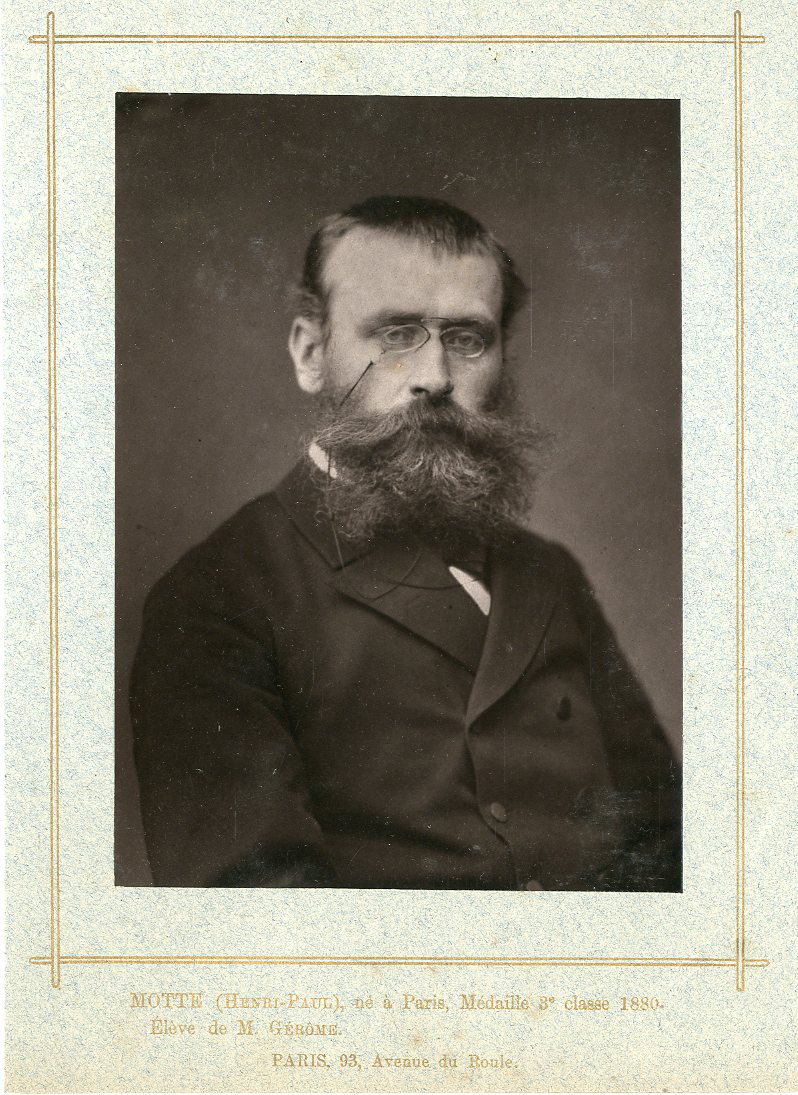
Portrait of Henri-Paul Motte

Henri-Paul Motte (French pronunciation: [ɑ̃ʁi pɔl mɔt]; 13 December 1846 – 1 April 1922) was a French painter from Paris who specialised in historical subjects.

A pupil of French painter Jean-Léon Gérôme—whose works likewise included historical paintings as well as Greek mythology and Orientalism—Motte first exhibited his paintings at the Paris Salon of 1874, starting with the Le cheval de Troie (The Trojan horse), which was acquired by the Wadsworth Atheneum in 2011.

In 1892, Motte was made a Chevalier de la Légion d'honneur, the highest and most prestigious French national order of merit. He won a bronze medal at the Exposition Universelle of 1900, a world's fair in Paris. He is best known for his rendition of the 17th century Siege of La Rochelle, which depicts Cardinal Richelieu in battle, completed in 1881.

== Works ==
- Le cheval de Troie (The Trojan horse) (1874; Wadsworth Atheneum, Hartford, Connecticut)
- Baal Moloch dévorant les prisonniers de guerre à Babylone (Baal Moloch devouring the prisoners of war in Babylon) (1876; National Museum of Fine Arts of Algiers)
- Passage du Rhône par l'armée d'Annibal (Hannibal's army crossing the Rhône) (1878)
- Circé et les compagnons d'Ulysse (Circe and the companions of Ulysses) (1879)
- César s'ennuie (1880)
- Richelieu sur la digue de La Rochelle (Richelieu on the sea wall of La Rochelle) (1881; Musée des Beaux-Arts de La Rochelle)
- La fiancée de Bélus (The Fiancee of Belus) (1885)
- Vercingétorix se rend à César (Vercingetorix surrenders to Caesar) (1886)
- Les oies du Capitole (The geese of the Capitol) (1889)
- Napoléon au trône de Charlemagne (Napoleon at Charlemagne's Throne) (1898)

== Gallery ==
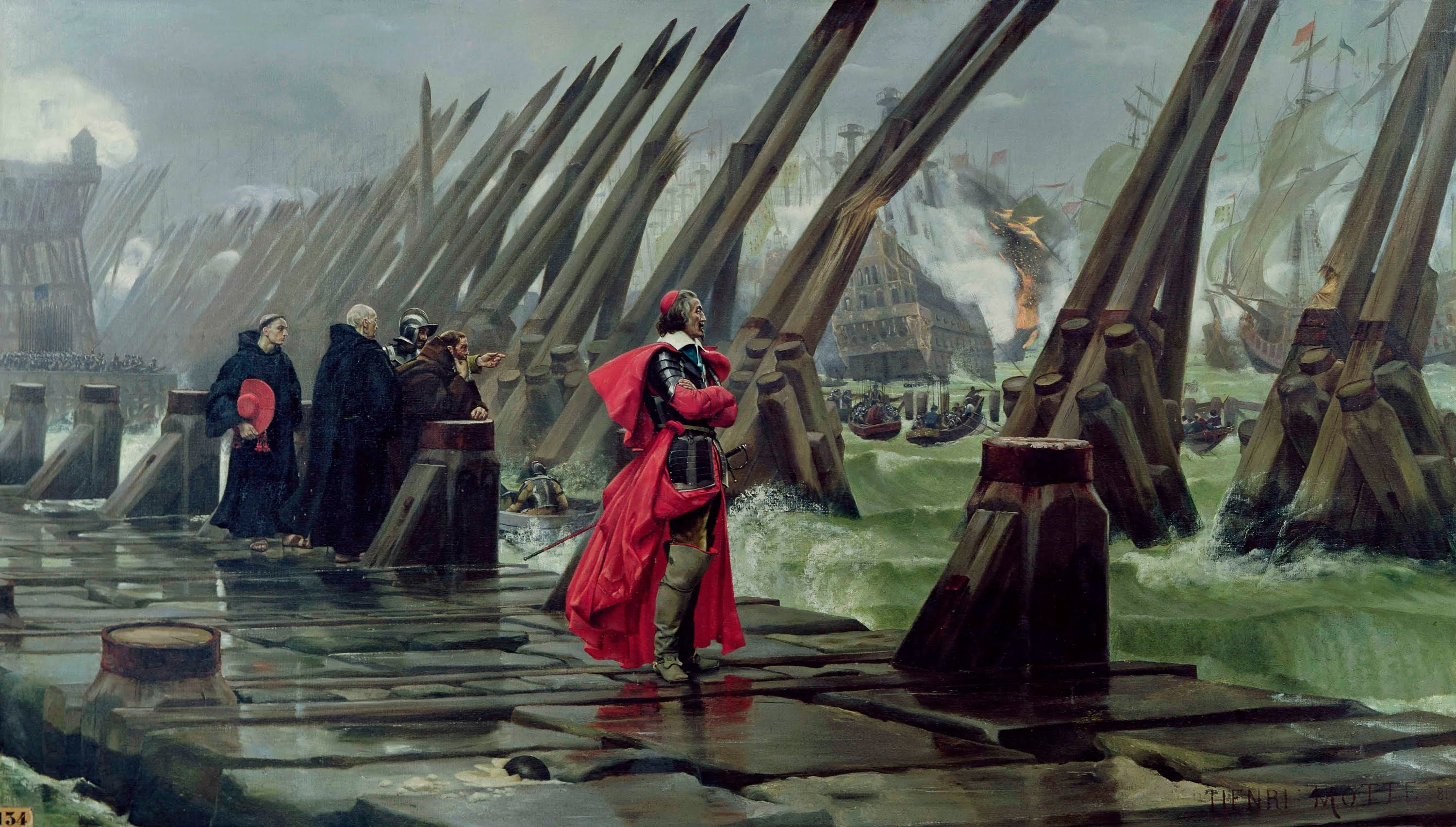
Richelieu on the sea wall of La Rochelle, 1881

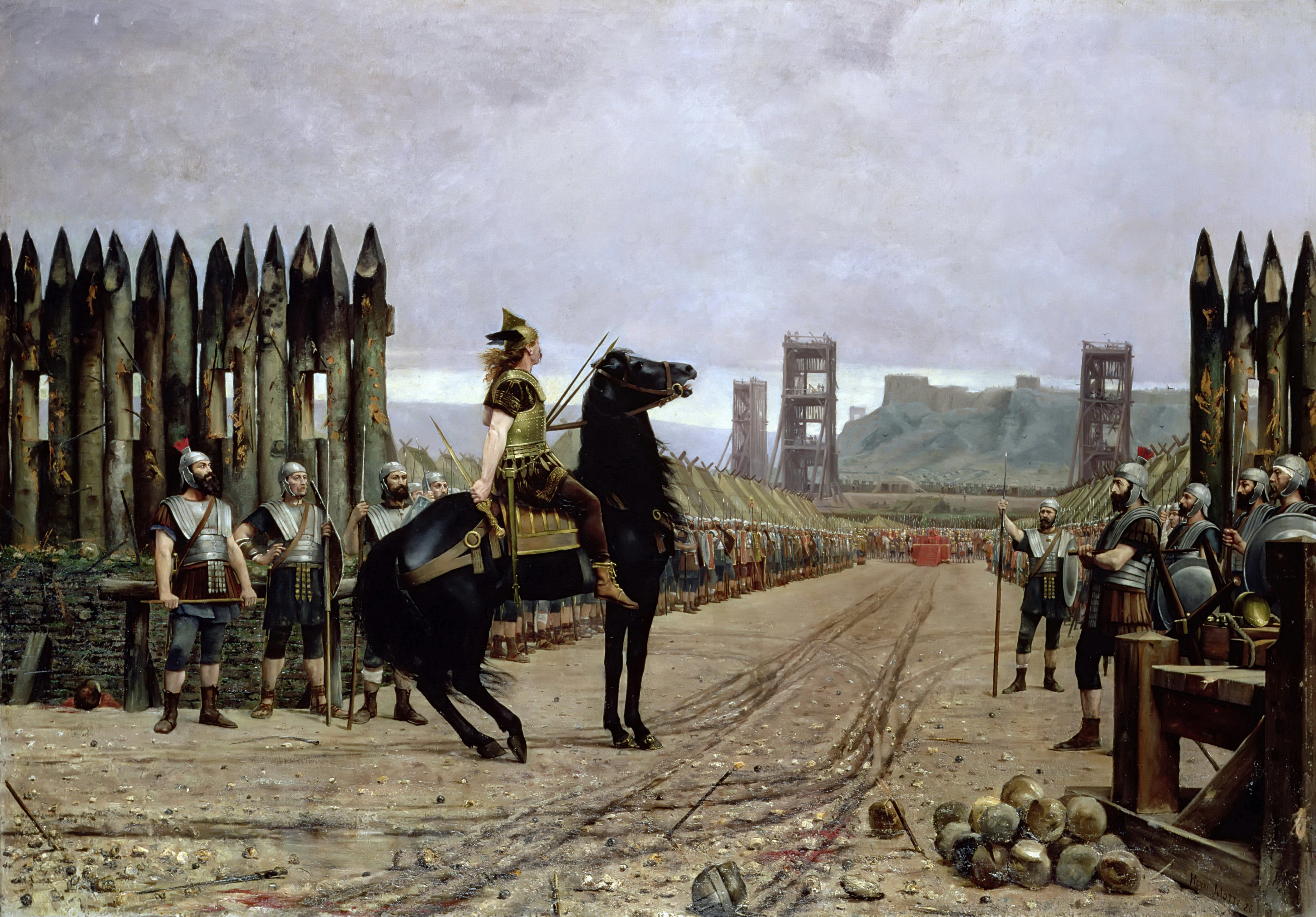
Vercingetorix surrendering to Caesar, 1886

Hannibal's army crossing the Rhône, 1878

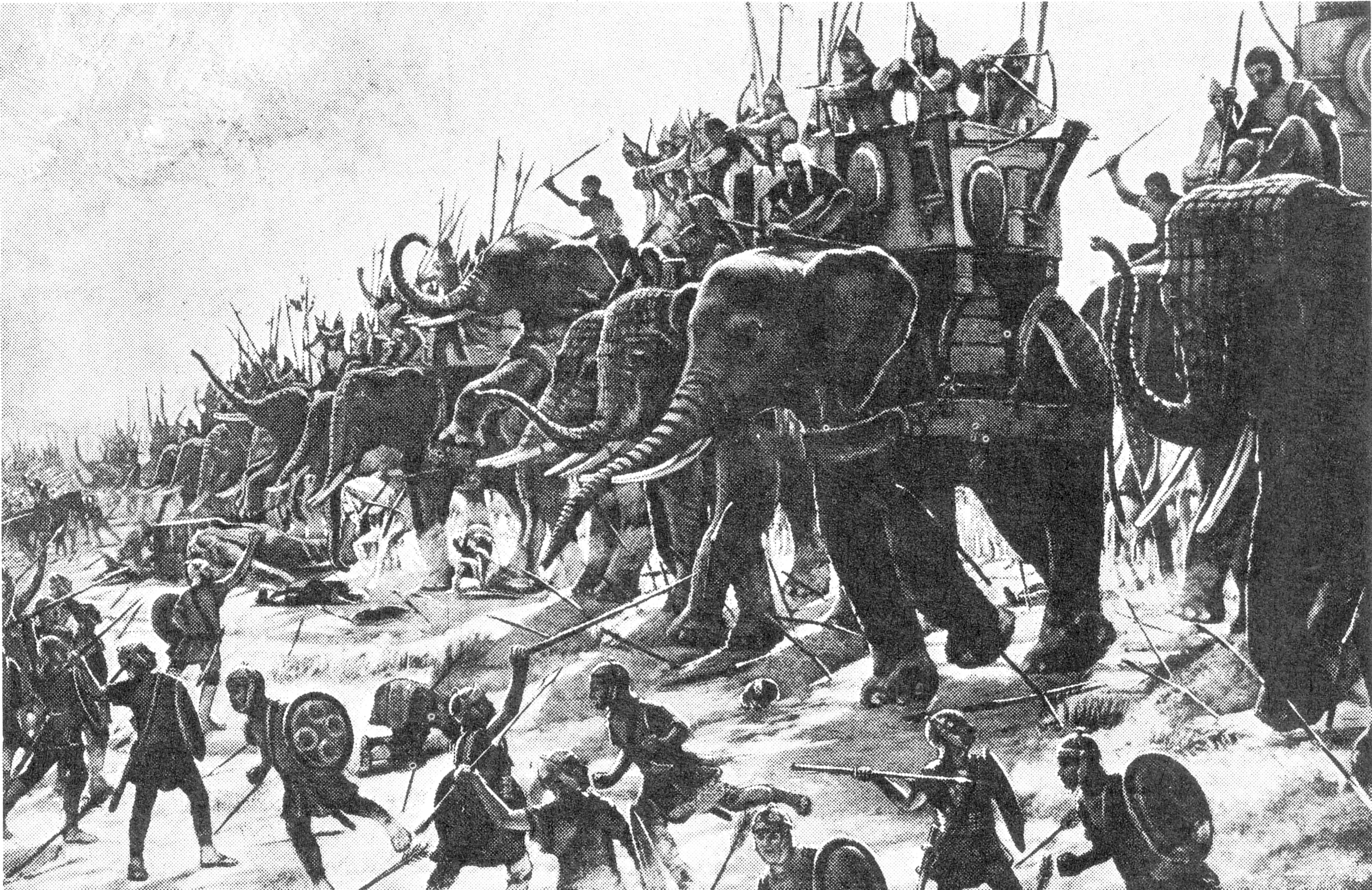
Battle of Zama, 1890

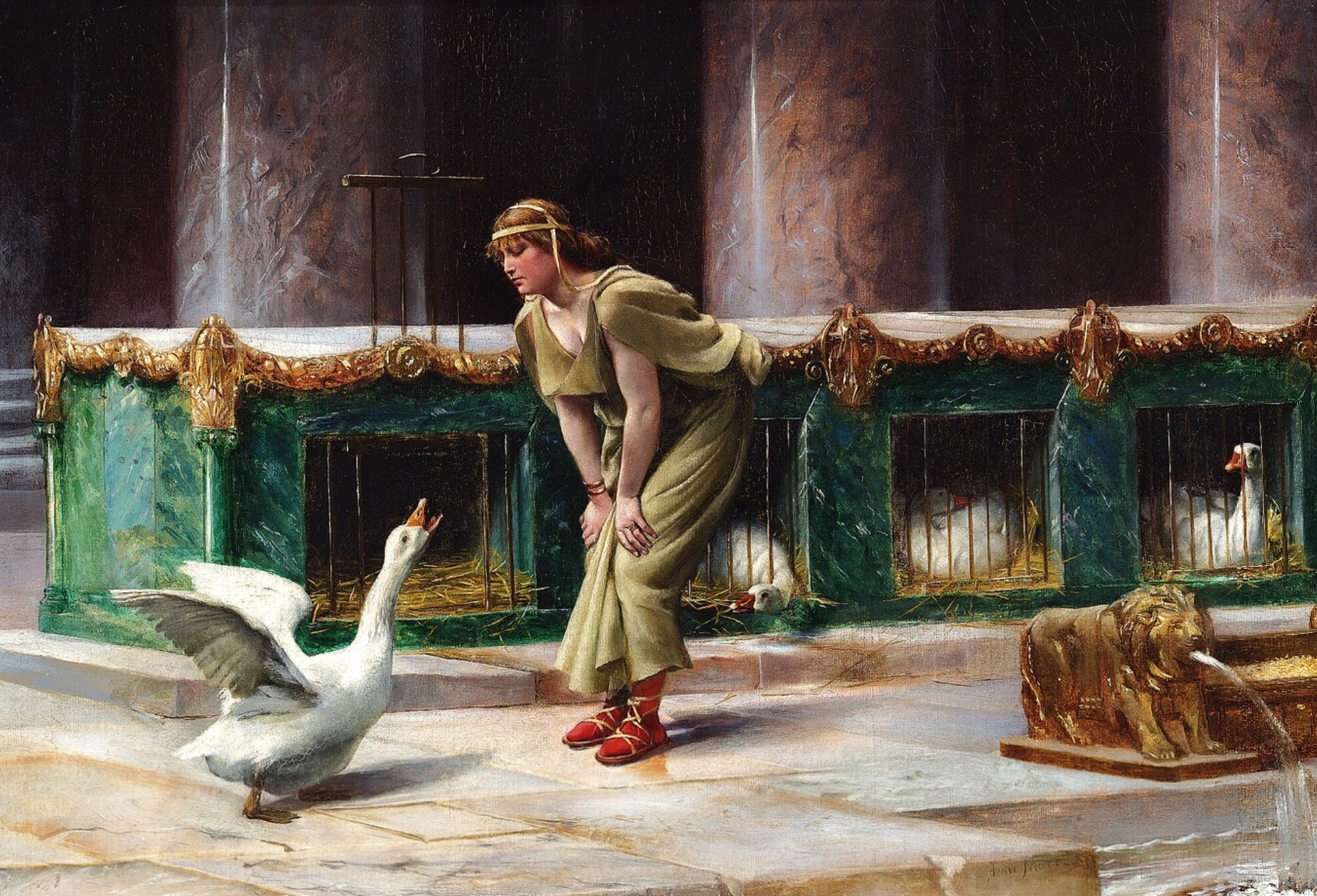
The geese of the Capitol

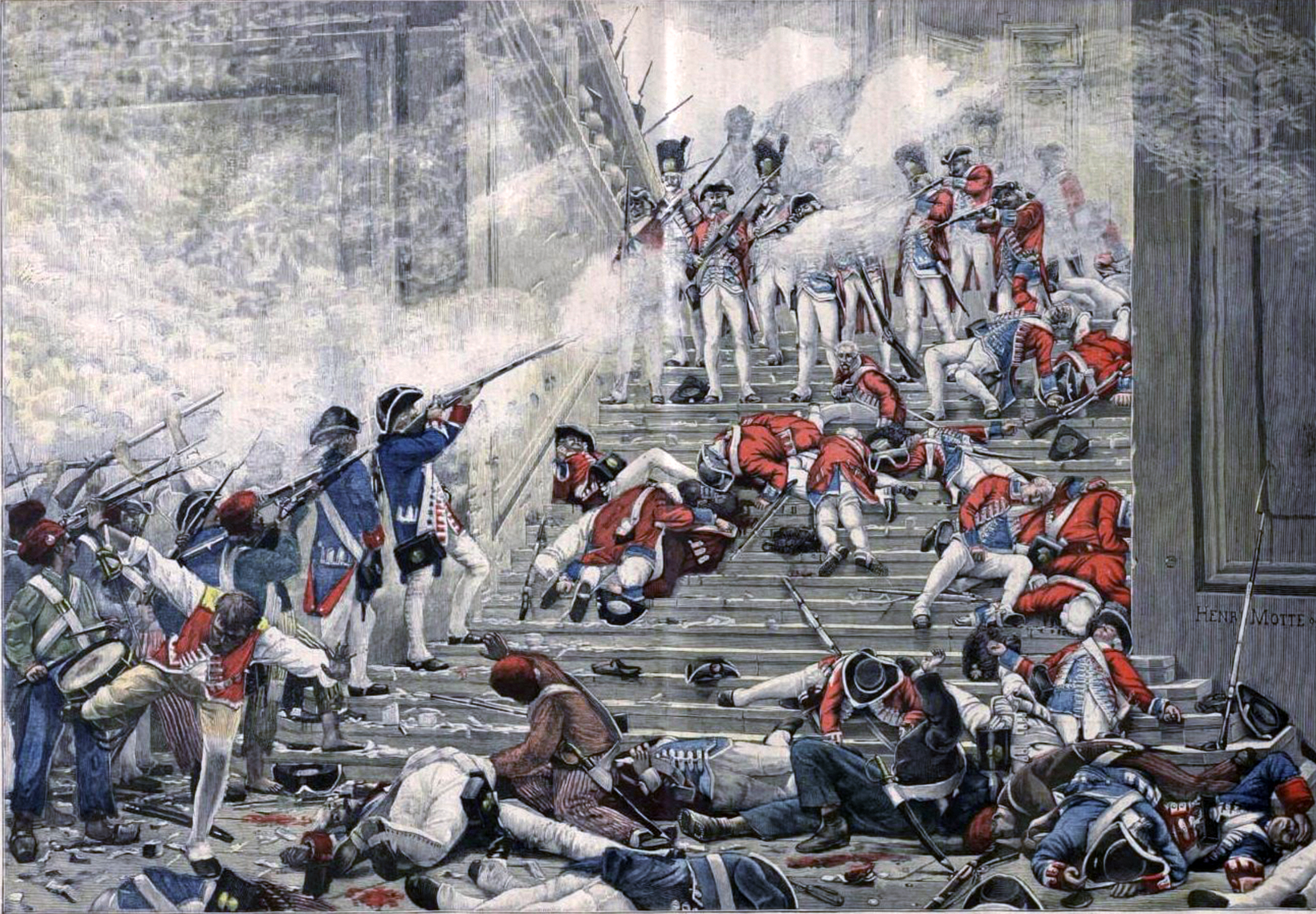
Swiss Guards on the grand staircase of the palace during the storming of the Tuileries in 1792

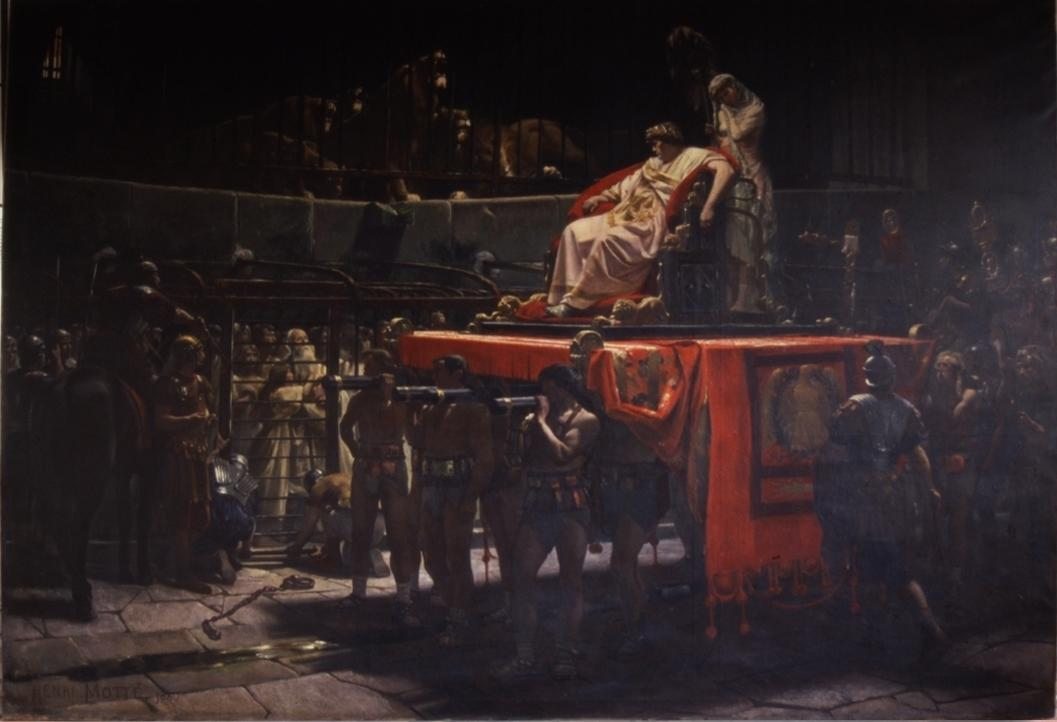
Caesar is bored

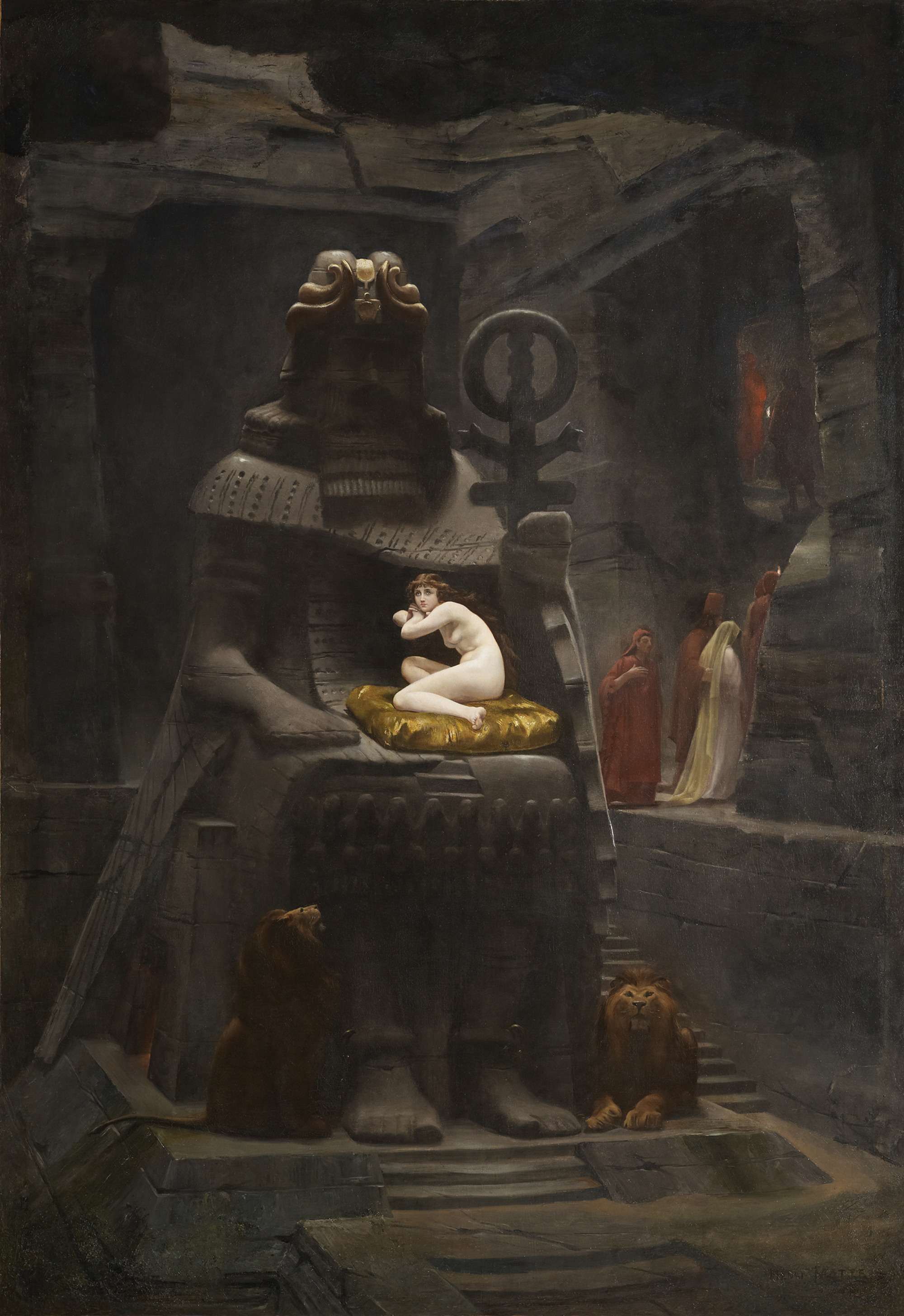
The Fiancée of Belus, 1885

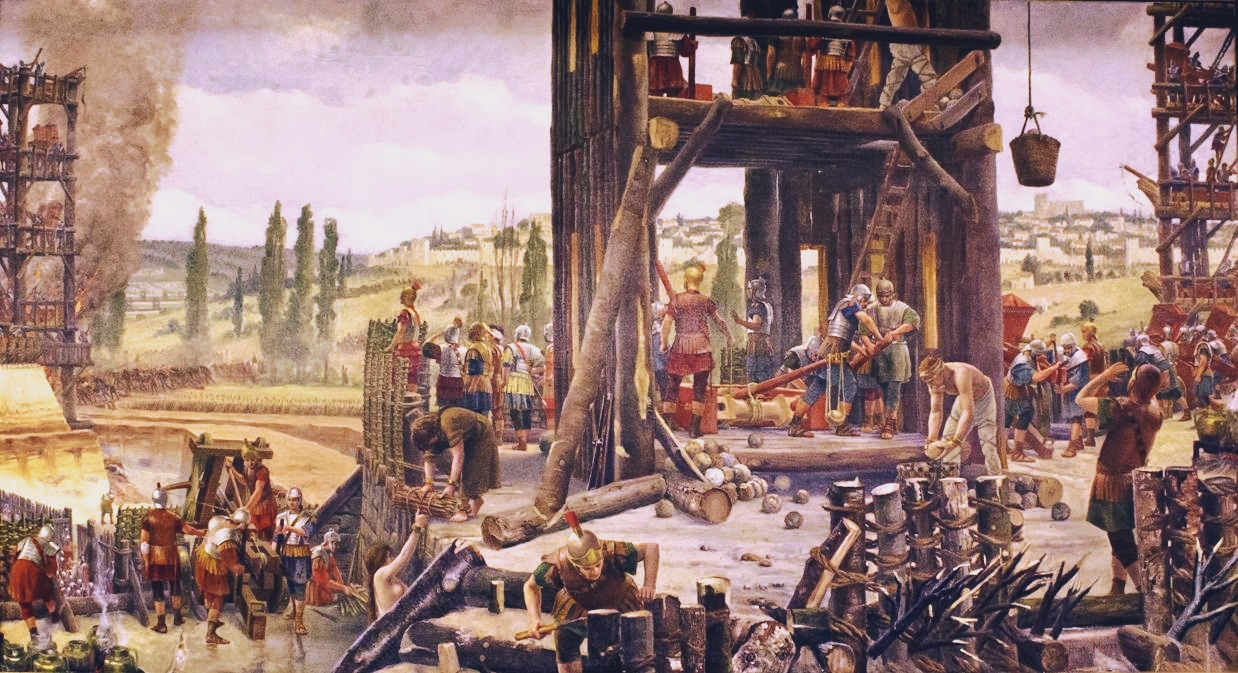
Siege of Alesia, 1888

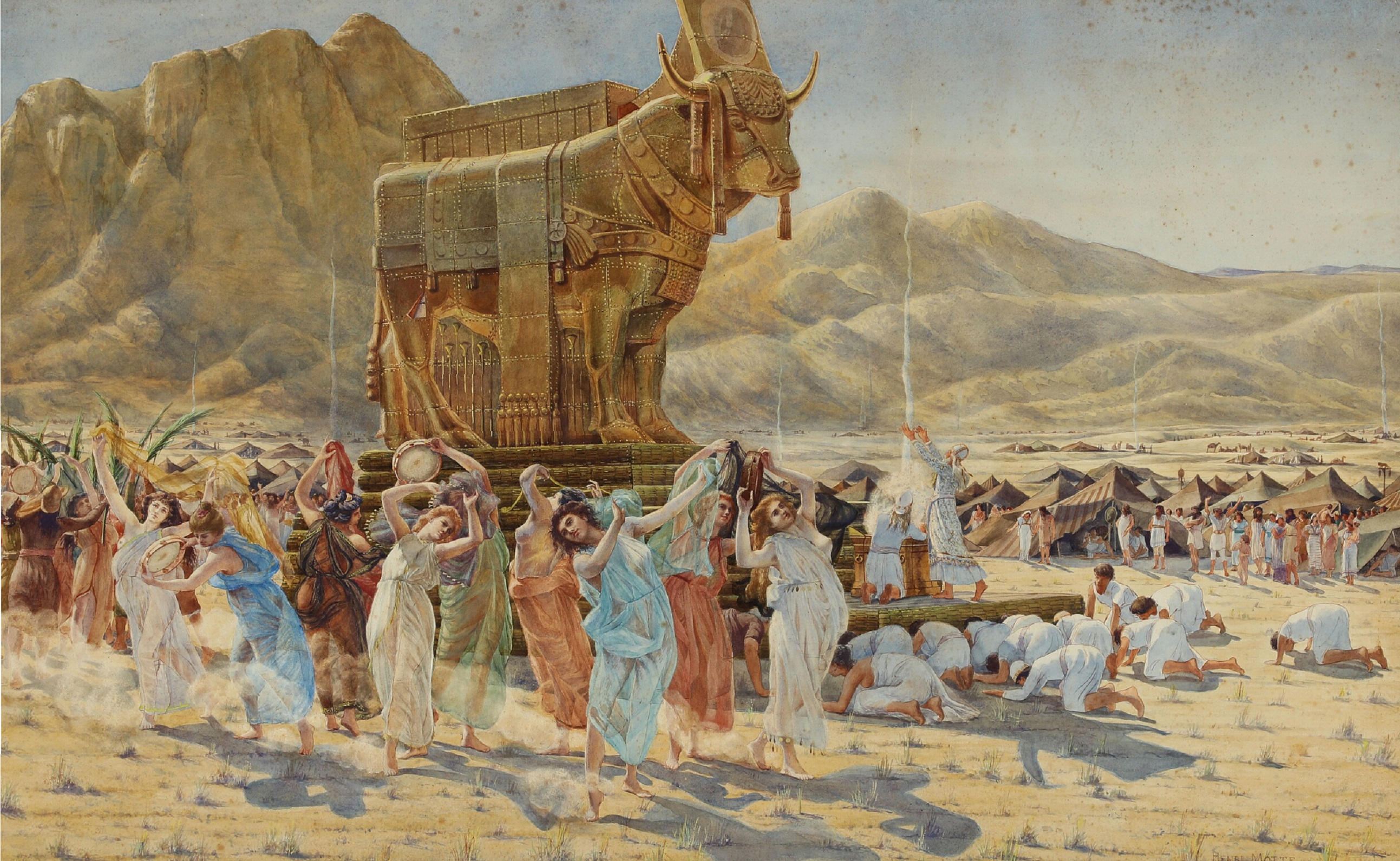
The Israelites dancing around the Golden Calf, 1899

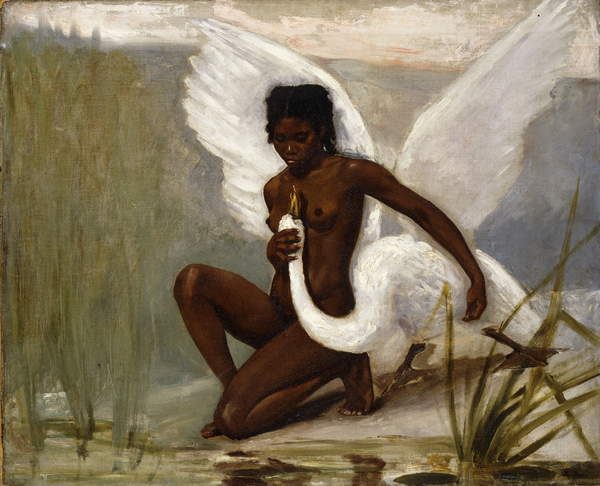
Leda and the Swan, 1900
