= Supplicia canum =

Sacrifice of dogs in Roman religion

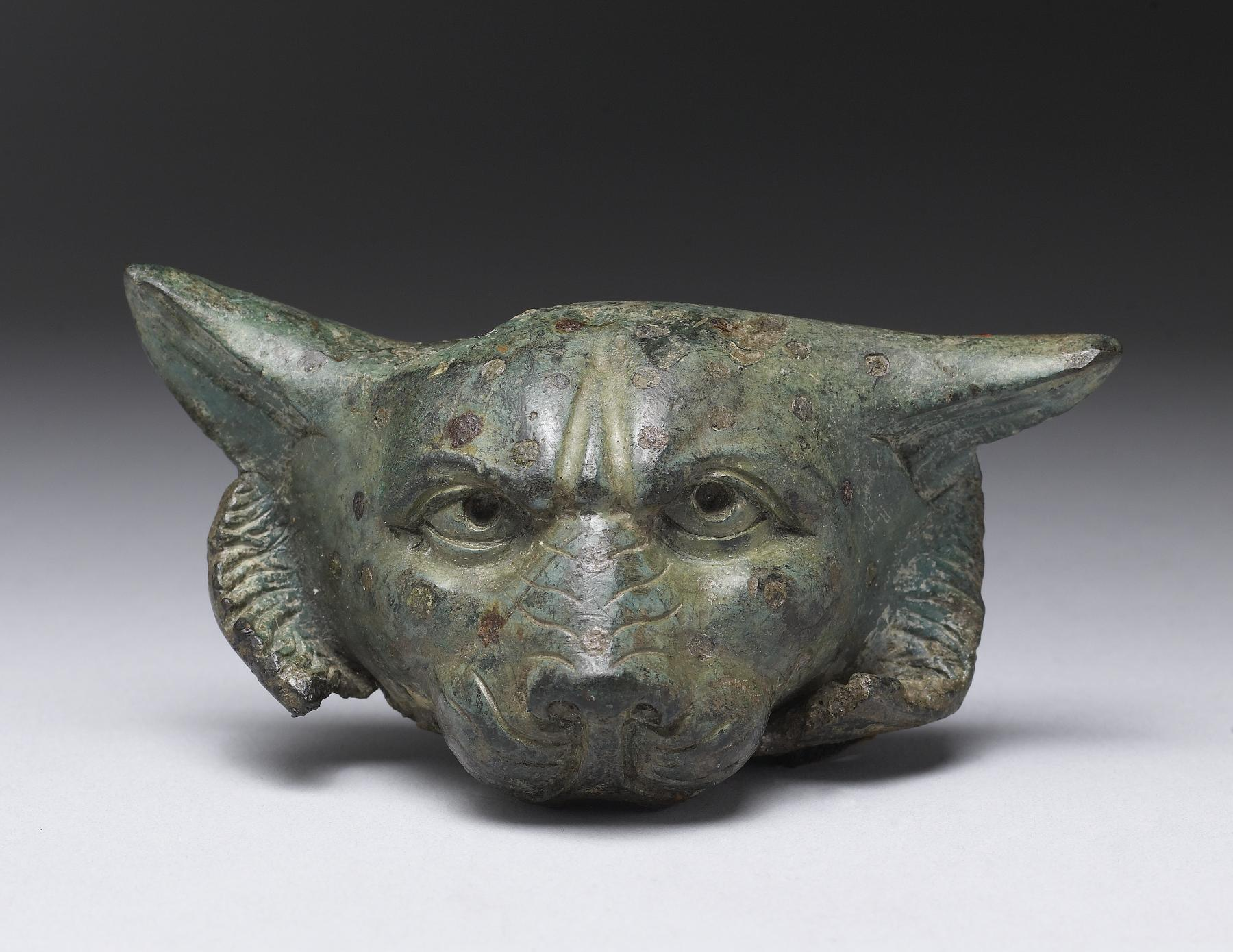
Roman bronze dog furniture ornament of the 1st century (Walters Art Museum)

The supplicia canum ('punishment of the dogs') was an annual sacrifice of ancient Roman religion in which live dogs were suspended from a furca ('fork') or cross (Latin: crux) and paraded. It appears on none of the extant Roman calendars, but a late source places it on August 3 (III Non. Aug.).

In the same procession, geese were decorated in gold and purple and carried in honor. Ancient sources who explain the origin of the supplicia say that the geese were honored for saving the city during the Gallic siege of Rome. When the Gauls launched a nocturnal assault by stealth on the citadel, the geese raised a noisy alarm. The failure of the watchdogs to bark was thereafter ritually punished each year.

== Form of punishment ==
The implement on which the dog was carried is called a furca by Pliny the Elder (1st century AD), who describes it as made of elder wood, and a crux by Servius (4th century). Plutarch uses a verbal form referring to a stauros (σταυρός, 'stake'). After crucifixion was banned by Constantine I, the first emperor to convert to Christianity, the furca replaced the crux in sentencing prescribed by the legal code. The furca had a Y shape. The furca or palus ('stake') was a traditional instrument of punishment to which the condemned was bound for the supplicium de more maiorum ('punishment according to ancestral custom'), a form of capital punishment by scourging. His hands were tied, and his head was veiled. The stake was originally a dead or barren tree, possibly a fruit tree, or an arbor infelix ('unproductive tree' or 'tree of ill fortune'), one of the several species regarded as under the guardianship (tutela) of the gods below (di inferi). The arbores infelices included trees and shrubs bearing black berries or fruit, as does the elder.

The punishment de more maiorum was distinct from crucifixion, which was reserved for slaves in the Republican era. Scourging at the stake was a sentence for treason (perduellio) and for committing a sex crime (stuprum) against or with one of the Vestals, who were the only women subject to this punishment. It lapsed into disuse during the late Republic of the 2nd and 1st centuries BC, but was revived during the Imperial period, when people of higher social status were exempt from it.

Binding and striking probably had a religious dimension, present also in other Roman rituals such as the Lupercalia, when youths clad in goatskins ran through the streets flailing bystanders with leather thongs from sacrificed goats and dogs, and the Mamuralia, for which a scapegoat figure was beaten with sticks. Although the dogs are not said to have been beaten, the supplicia canum shares some elements with the traditional punishment at the stake, and with the punishment Tiberius administered in the province of Africa to priests of the Carthaginian god identified with the Roman Saturn, usually regarded as Baal. In retribution for their ancestral custom of child sacrifice (whether or not such sacrifices actually occurred), Tiberius had them crucified on trees in their own temple precinct as offerings.

== Ritual topography ==
The procession route involved the temples of Juventas ('Youth') and Summanus, an obscure and complex chthonic god of archaic Roman religion who shares some attributes with both Jupiter and Pluto. It may have taken place in the Circus Maximus.

== Myth of origin ==
Sources mentioning the ritual agree that the "punishment" was inflicted on the dogs for their failure to warn the Romans of the stealth attack against the citadel by the Gauls during the Gallic siege of Rome in 390 BC (or 387). Legends vary regarding this historical event—the only sack of the city during the Republican era—but in the sources that allude to the supplicia canum, temple geese are said to have raised the alarm instead. Plutarch and Aelian rationalize the dogs' failure by explaining that the Gauls fed the siege-starved dogs and silenced them, while the geese called out excitedly. In recognition of this service, for the supplicia procession geese were ornamented in purple and gold, then carried on a litter. The August 3 date, however, is hard to account for within the traditional chronology that had the Gauls setting fire to the city on July 19 and maintaining a siege through February.

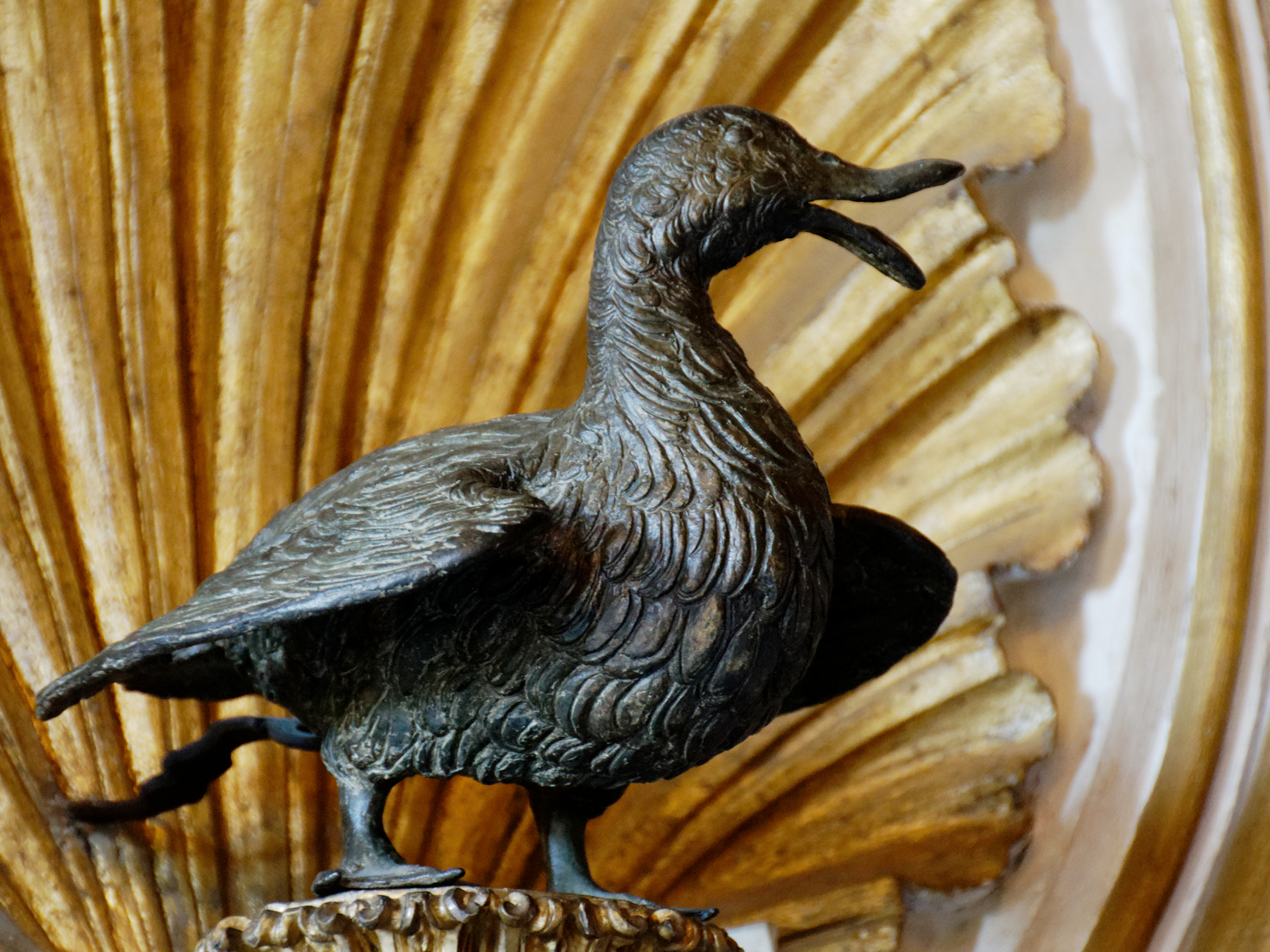
Roman Imperial bronze goose (Capitoline Museums)

In some stories, Marcus Manlius Capitolinus led the way in responding to the alarm, warding off the first Gaul to reach the top of the Capitoline cliff, or alternatively expelling them from the Temple of Jupiter, which they had entered through tunnels. Manlius is described once as a custos ('guard') of the citadel, perhaps in command of the iuventus, the young warriors as a collective. Two or three years later, however, Manlius had attempted to capitalize on his reputation for heroism and to establish himself as a king or tyrannos, a much-despised role in Republican Rome. He was accused of treason, and in one source, was sentenced to be beaten to death de more maiorum. Roman narrative traditions regarding the Gallic siege are complex, "a hopeless jumble of aetiological tales, family apologias, doublets, and transferences from Greek history", including an improbable last-minute victory or at least the holding of the citadel itself, thanks to the geese. Some scholars have suspected that the citadel was breached and that the Romans ameliorated the disaster with layers of legend over time. The incongruity of Manlius's legendary heroism and his execution for treason a relatively short time later could conceal a military disgrace. The crucified dogs may originally have been intended to serve as a pharmakos (φαρμακός, 'scapegoat'). The Christian writers Arnobius and Ambrose indicate that geese and dogs were kept on the Capitoline well into the 4th century.

== Background ==
Dogs, or parts of a dog's body, held numerous magical and medical powers in Greco-Roman belief, but were regarded in Roman religion with ambivalence. Dogs were companions to the household Lares, but could not be touched or spoken of by the Flamen Dialis, the high priest of Jupiter.

Dog sacrifices were carried out in Rome also for the Robigalia, a spring festival aimed at warding off crop diseases. The augurium canarium ('dog augury'), which involved both augurs and the state priests, was a moveable feast in response to the rising of the Dogstar, Sirius. Festivals in August following the supplicia canum deal with themes of agricultural bounty ensured by sun and water, centering on the Volcanalia of Volcanus (Vulcan) August 23.

Dog sacrifice is found among other Italic peoples. According to the Iguvine Tablets, Oscans sacrificed an unblemished dog or puppy to the chthonic Hondus Jovius: it was butchered, and certain parts roasted on spits, with remains left after the sacrifice buried at the altar. No mention is made of disposal after the supplicia canum. The Romans typically sacrificed domestic animals that were a normal part of their diet, and shared the meat in a communal meal. Victims such as dogs were considered inedible, as was the October Horse offered to Mars, and were usually consumed in a holocaust for deities whose spheres of influence pertained to the cycle of birth and death, such as Hecate and Mana Genita.

== Ancient sources ==
The following ancient authors (listed chronologically) describe or refer indirectly to the supplicia canum, a name for the rite which comes from Pliny:

- Pliny the Elder, Natural History 29.57 (Latin)
- Plutarch, On the Fortune of the Romans 12 (English translation)
- Aelian, De natura animalium 12.33 (Greek or Latin translation)
- Arnobius, Adversus nationes 6.20
- Ambrose, Hexameron 5.13.44
- Servius, note to Aeneid 8.652 (Latin)
- Johannes Lydus, De mensibus 4.114

== See also ==
- Roman goose
- Guard goose
