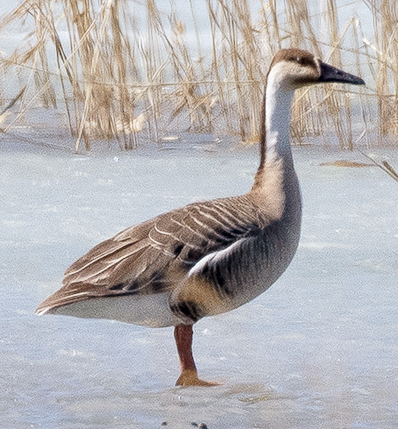
- Wild Anser cygnoides in Buryatia, eastern Russia

Conservation status
- Endangered (IUCN 3.1)

Scientific classification
- Kingdom: Animalia
- Phylum: Chordata
- Class: Aves
- Order: Anseriformes
- Family: Anatidae
- Genus: Anser
- Species: A. cygnoides

Binomial name
- Anser cygnoides (Linnaeus, 1758)
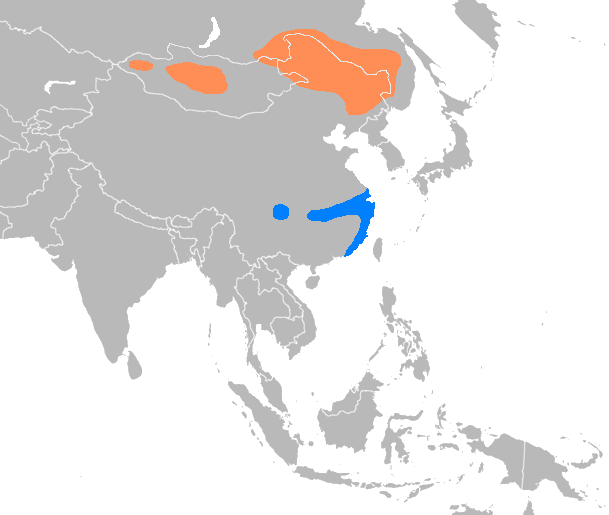
- Breeding (northern areas) in orange and wintering (southern areas) ranges in blue

Synonyms
- Anser cygnoid (Linnaeus, 1758) (see text); Anas cygnoid Linnaeus, 1758; Cycnopsis cygnoides (lapsus); Cygnopsis cygnoides (Linnaeus, 1758)

= Swan goose =

Species of bird

The swan goose (Anser cygnoides) is a large goose with a natural breeding range in inland Mongolia, Northeast China, and the Russian Far East. It is migratory and winters mainly in central and eastern China. Vagrant birds are encountered in Japan and Korea (where it used to winter in numbers when it was more common), and more rarely in Kazakhstan, Laos, coastal Siberia, Taiwan, Thailand and Uzbekistan.

While uncommon in the wild, this species has been extensively domesticated, when it is known as Chinese goose. Introduced and feral populations of its domestic breeds occur in many places outside its natural range. The wild form is also kept in collections, and escapes are not unusual amongst feral flocks of other Anser and Branta geese.

== Taxonomy ==
The swan goose was formally described in 1758 by the Swedish naturalist Carl Linnaeus in the tenth edition of his Systema Naturae under the binomial name Anser cygnoides. The word "cygnoides" first appears in the margin abbreviated as "cygnoid." and appears in full two lines under it, but some authors erroneously regard cygnoid (without the fullstop) to be the correct original Latin spelling, erroneously comparing it to the spelling of the name Estrilda astrild.

It is now one of 11 species placed in the genus Anser that was described by the French zoologist Mathurin Jacques Brisson in 1760. The specific epithet combines the Latin cygnus, from Ancient Greek κύκνος kúknos meaning "swan", with the interfix -o- and the suffix -īdēs, from Ancient Greek -ειδής -eidēs meaning "-like, resembling". The species is monotypic, with no subspecies recognised.

== Description ==
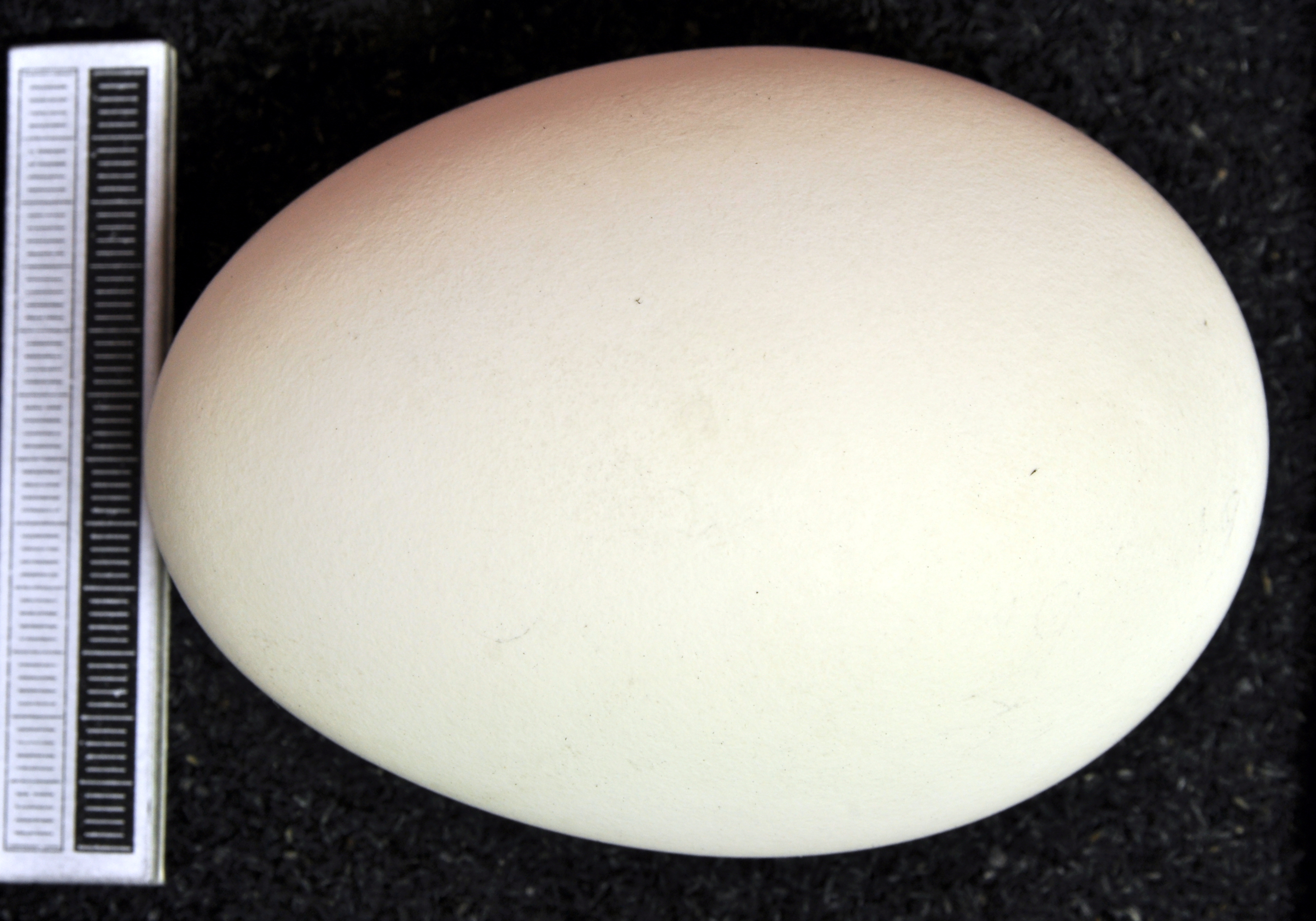
Egg, Collection Museum Wiesbaden

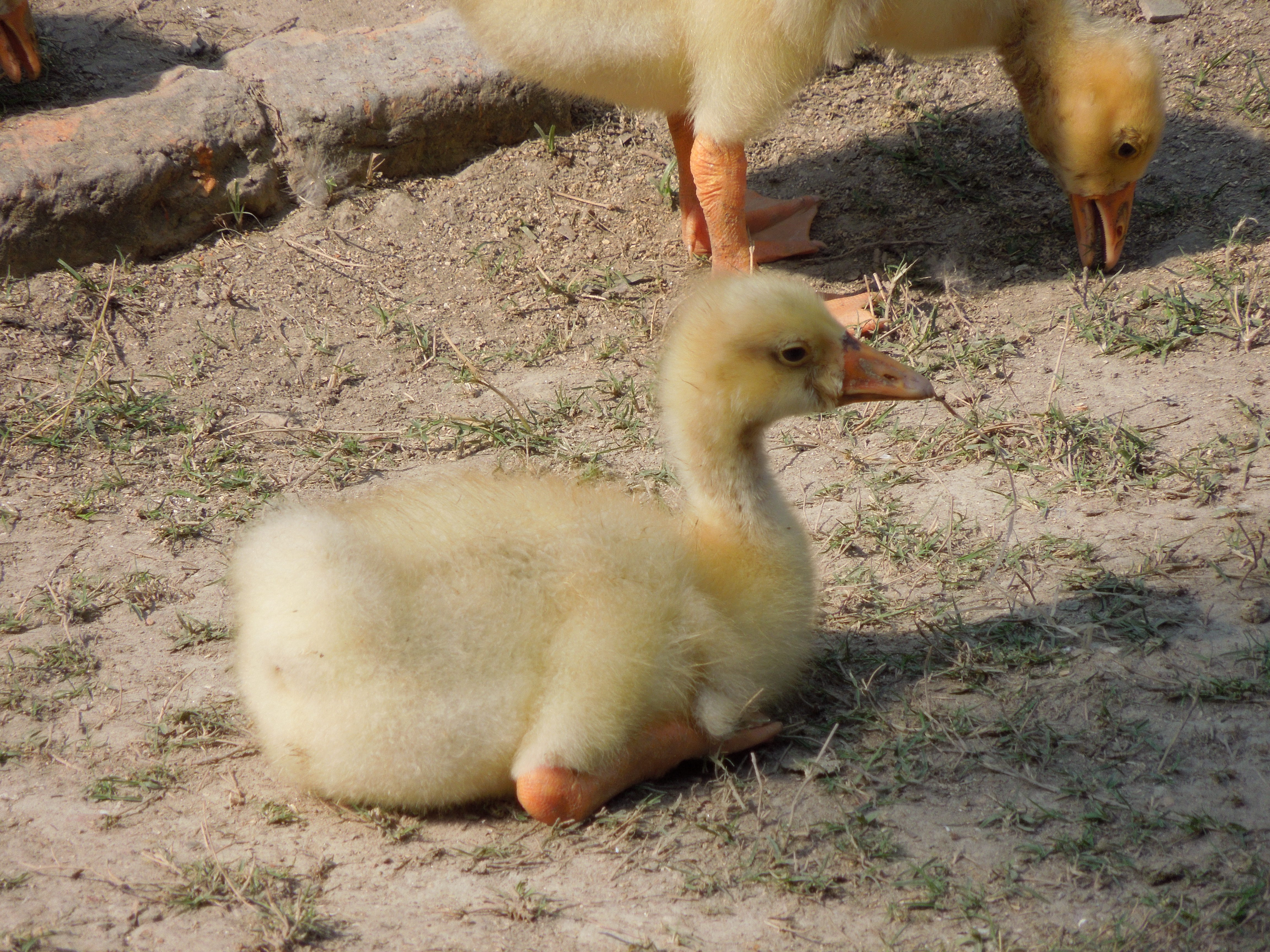
A gosling of swan goose in Bangladesh

=== Physical ===
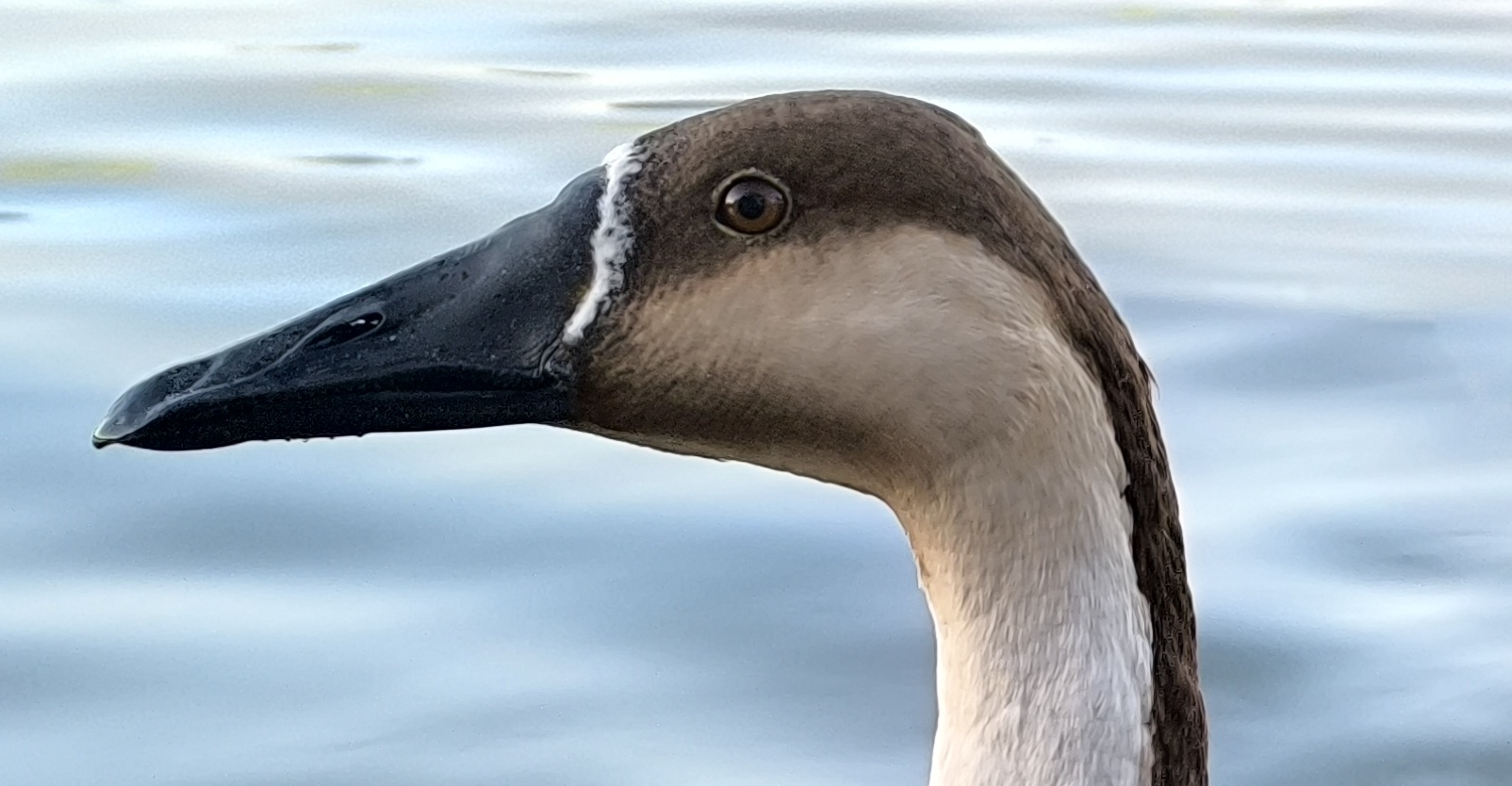
Wild type

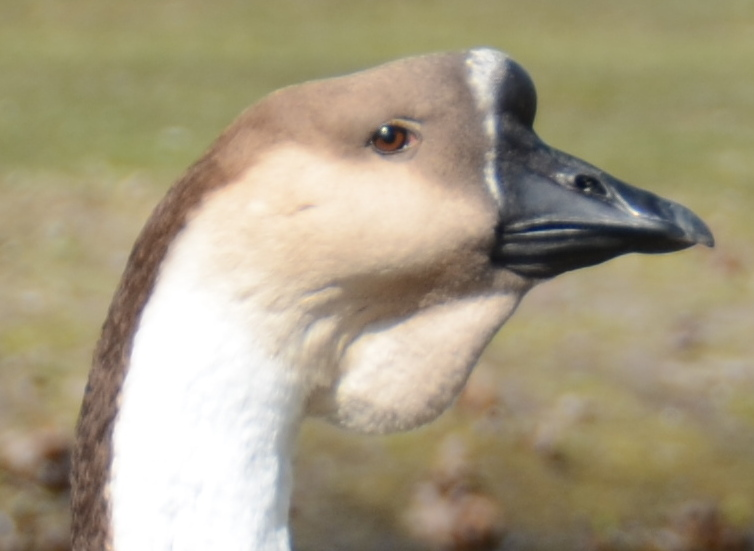
Domestic type

The swan goose is large and long-necked for its genus, wild birds being up to 81–94 cm (32–37 in) long (the longest Anser goose) and weighing 2.8–3.5 kg (6.2–7.7 lb) or more. It is the second-heaviest Anser, after the greylag goose (A. anser). They are generally sexually dimorphic both physically and behaviorally. Males are typically larger, with a heavier frame and distinguishable voice characteristics.

In fact, the largest females are barely as large as the smallest males. Typical measurements of the wing are 45–46 cm (18–18 in) in males, 37.5–44 cm (14.8–17.3 in) in females; the bill is about 8.7–9.8 cm (3.4–3.9 in) long in males and 7.5–8.5 cm (3.0–3.3 in) in females. The tarsus of males measures around 8.1 cm (3.2 in). The wingspan of adult geese is 160–185 cm (63–73 in).

The upperparts are greyish-brown, with thin light fringes to the larger feathers and a maroon hindneck and cap (reaching just below the eye). The remiges are blackish, as are the entire underwing and the white-tipped rectrices, while the upper- and undertail coverts are white. A thin white stripe surrounds the bill base. Apart from darker streaks on the belly and flanks, the underside is pale buff, being especially light on the lower head and foreneck which are sharply delimited against the maroon. In flight, the wings appear dark, with no conspicuous pattern. Uniquely among its genus, the long, heavy bill is completely black; the legs and feet, on the other hand, are orange as in most of its relatives. The eyes' irides are maroon. Juveniles are duller than adult birds, and lack the white bill base and dark streaks on the underside.

=== Auditory ===
The voice of the hen and gander differ, ganders lean toward a higher pitch and will carry a tone longer than the hen. They use variations in pitch, tone, and length to convey information to each other. A piercing cry, typical of males, can be used for contact calls with a territorial warning call becoming long and drawn-out and with a honk that ascends in pitch. Females speak in shorter tones, they can exhibit a similar but more barking honk upon the arrival of members or acknowledgement of happenings. A hens call is generally more raspy and lower pitched comparatively.

=== Genomic ===
The karyotype of the swan goose is 2n=80, consisting of four pairs of macrochromosomes, 35 pairs of microchromosomes, and a pair of sex chromosomes. The two largest macrochromosome pairs as well as the Z (female) chromosome are submetacentric, while the third-largest chromosome pair is acrocentric and the fourth-largest is metacentric. The W chromosomes are acrocentric too, as are the larger microchromosomes, the smaller ones probably being telocentric. Compared to the greylag goose, there seems to have been some rearrangement on the fourth-largest chromosome pair.

== Ecology ==
It inhabits steppe to taiga and mountain valleys near freshwater, grazing on plants such as sedges (Cyperaceae), grasses (Poaceae) and water plants, and rarely swimming. It forms small flocks outside the breeding season. In the winter, it grazes on plains and stubble fields, sometimes far from water. Birds return from the winter quarters around April, and the breeding season starts soon thereafter. It breeds as single pairs or loose groups near marshes and other wetlands, with nesting activity starting about May. The clutch is usually 5–6 but sometimes up to 8 eggs, which are laid in a shallow nest made from plants, placed directly on the ground, often on a small knoll to keep it dry. The precocial young hatch after about 28 days and become sexually mature at 2–3 years of age. Around late August/early September, the birds leave for winter quarters, where they gather in small groups to moult their worn plumage.

The swan goose was uplisted from Near Threatened to Vulnerable on the IUCN Red List in 1992 and further to Endangered in 2000, as its population is declining due to habitat loss and excessive hunting and (particularly on the Sanjiang Plain in China) egg collecting. But new research has shown it to be not as rare as it was believed, and consequently, it was downlisted to Vulnerable status again in 2008. Still, less than 500 pairs might remain in Russia, while in Mongolia numbers are unknown, though about 1,000 were seen at Ögii Lake in 1977. Important wintering locations in China are Lake Dongting, Lake Poyang, the Yancheng Coastal Wetlands and other locations around the lower Yangtze River, where some 60,000 individuals may be found each year – though this may be almost the entire world population. Until the 1950s, the species wintered in small numbers (up to about 100 birds annually) in Japan, but habitat destruction has driven them away.

== Domestication ==
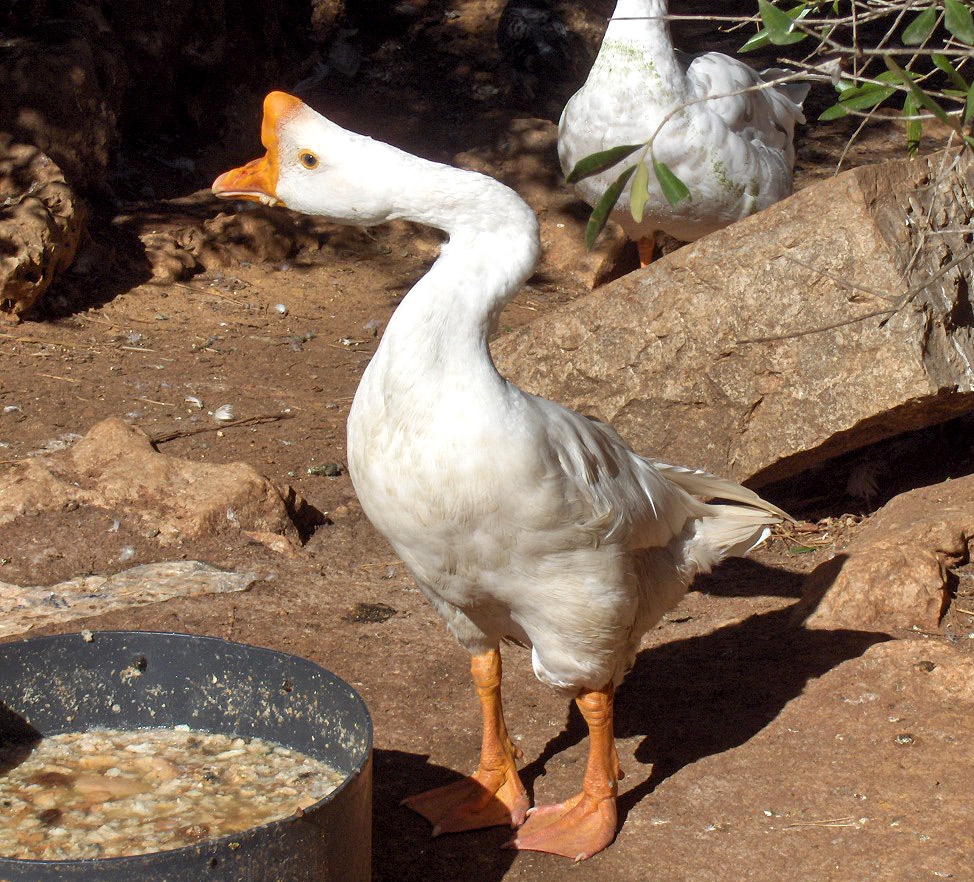
White Chinese goose, showing a strongly developed bill knob,

While a large majority of domestic geese are descendants of greylag goose (A. anser), there are two breeds are direct descendants of the swan goose, the Chinese goose and the African goose. These breeds have been domesticated since at least the mid-18th century – perhaps even (in China) since around 1000 BC. They vary considerably from their wild parent in appearance, temperament, and ability to produce meat and eggs; the most conspicuous feature is the prominent bill knob and upright posture.

The swan goose has been a popular choice for farms due to its preference for a forage-heavy diet. They are often employed as weeding and guard geese, and can reduce labor and feed costs for producers. Hand-raised individuals can become very friendly and affectionate adults, leading to many years of content relationships between a caregiver and the long-lived fowl (up to 20 years in captivity.) These geese function best in pairs as their species is heavily dependent on social interaction. A gander will often guard the flock from predators through active observation and posturing, while the hen will look out for the other members to ensure they are present and included in flock activities.

Charles Darwin studied goose breeds as part of his work on the theory of evolution. He noted that the external differences between Chinese geese and breeds descended from the Greylag goose belied a rather close relationship:

"The hybrids from the common and Chinese geese (A. cygnoides), species which are so different that they are generally ranked in distinct genera, have often bred in this country with either pure parent, and in one single instance they have bred inter se."

== Conservation ==
The species is currently classified as an endangered species by the IUCN based on ongoing population declines and range losses, exacerbated by recent poor breeding success and unsustainable levels of hunting. Total population was estimated as 36,000 – 43,500 mature individuals in 2023.
