= The Fiancée of Belus =

Painting by Henri-Paul Motte

The Fiancee of Belus
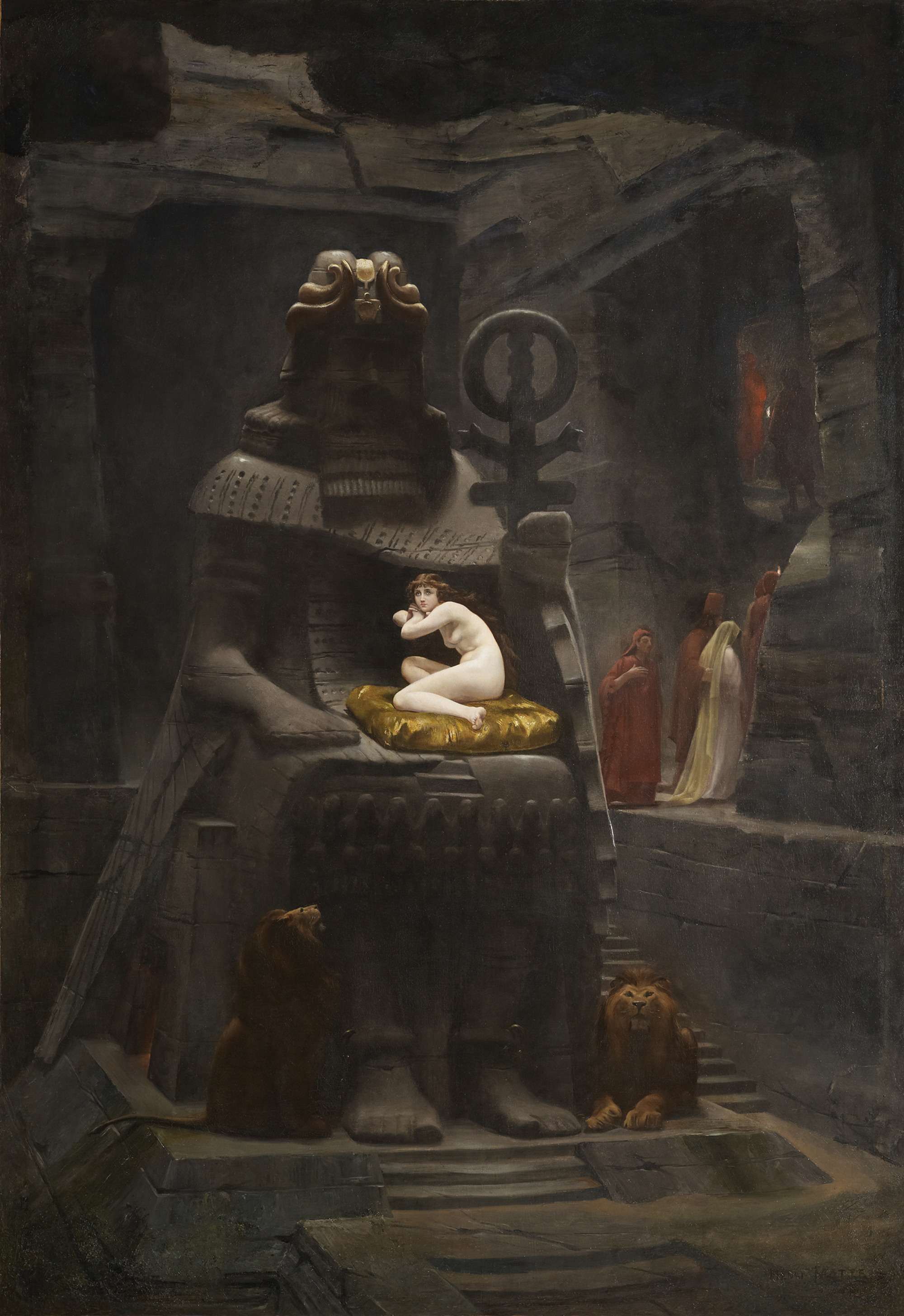
- Artist: Henri-Paul Motte
- Year: 1885
- Medium: Oil on canvas
- Dimensions: 178 cm × 122 cm (70 in × 48 in)
- Location: Musée d'Orsay, Paris

The Fiancée of Belus (French: La fiancée de Bélus) is a painting executed in 1885 by French artist Henri-Paul Motte based on a fanciful Babylonian ritual associated with the deity Belus (Bel). According to that ritual, Bel was offered a girl who sat on the lap of the Bel's statue overnight, and then was replaced by another, all of whom were the winners of daily beauty contests. Motte cited as a reference the Greek historian Herodotus, but the related quote was later found to be invented.

The Fiancee of Belus is painted in an academic style. To recreate the interior of the Babylonian temple, Motte copied the Greek temple in Olympia, while the sculpture was inspired by Lamassu. It was exhibited at the Salon of 1885 in Paris.

In 2013, the painting was acquired by the Musée d'Orsay where it is presently kept. It was previously housed in Galerie Vincent Lecuyer, near Musée d’Orsay and was exhibited at the BRAFA (BRussels Art FAir) and PAD Paris design and art fair.
