= Chinese goose =

Breed of domestic goose

Chinese Goose
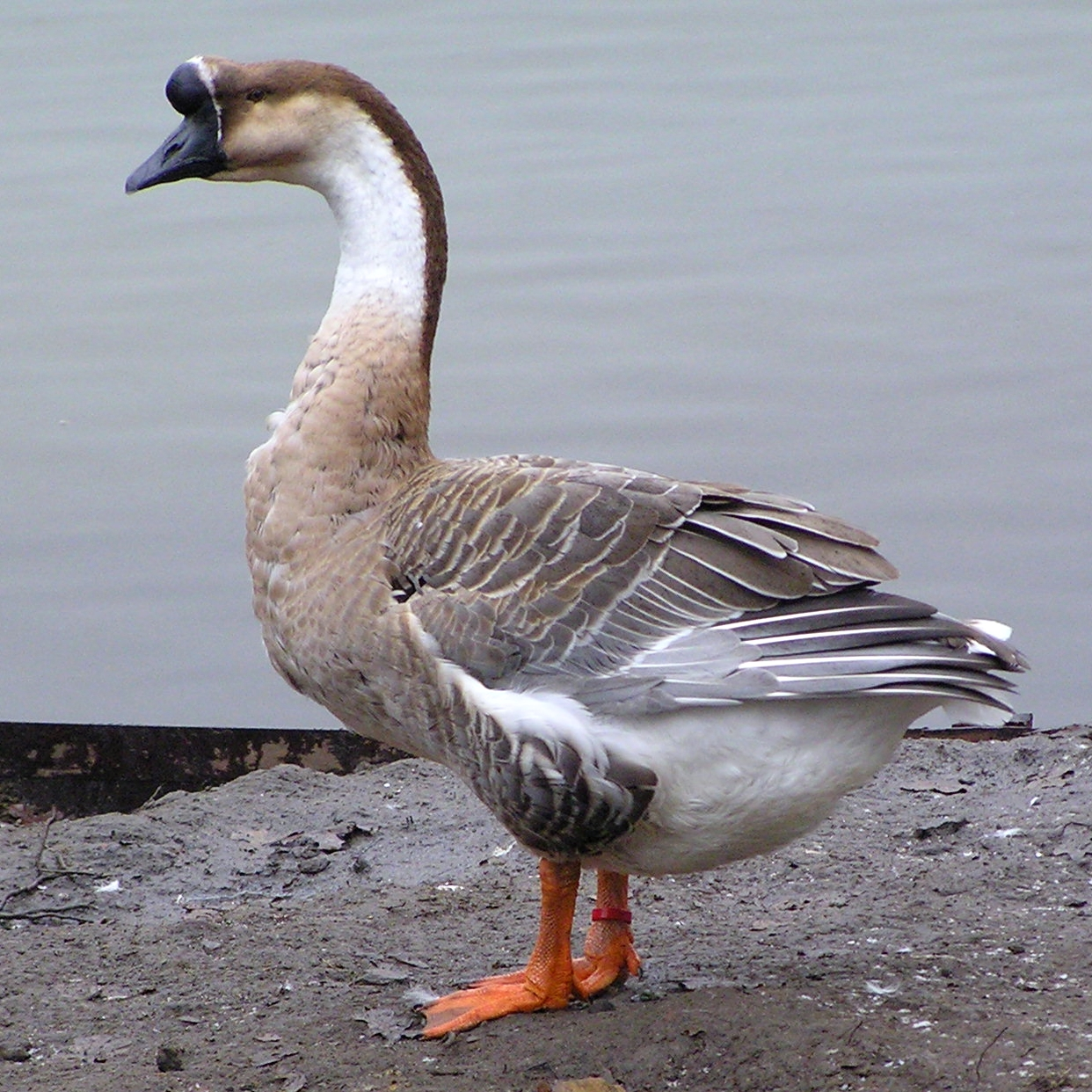
- Conservation status: FAO (2007): not at risk; DAD-IS (2022): unknown; Livestock Conservancy: watch
- Country of origin: China
- Distribution: Western countries

Traits
- Weight: Male: 4.5–5.4 kg; Female: 3.6–4.5 kg

Classification
- APA: yes
- EE: yes
- PCGB: geese: light

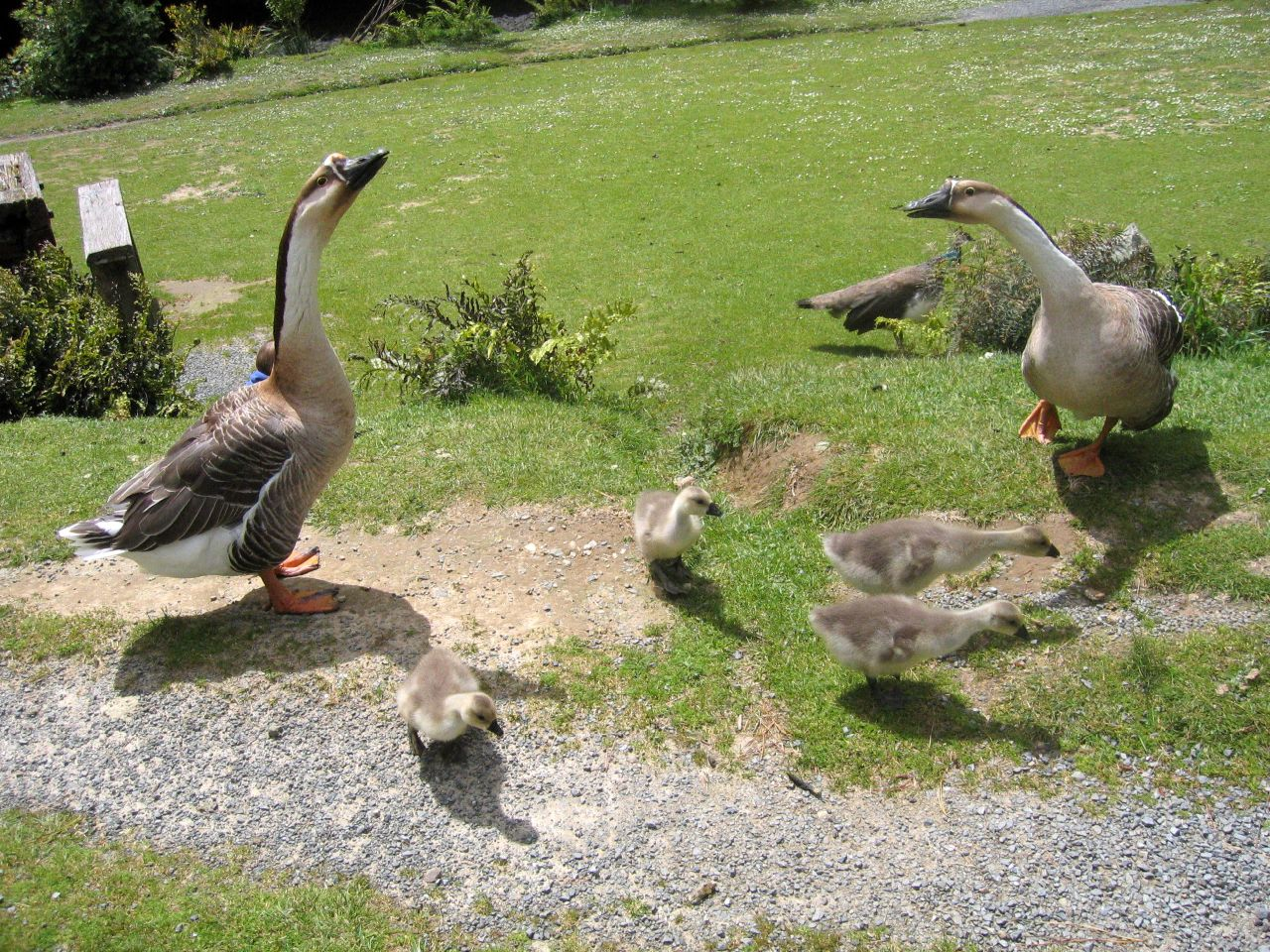
At Staglands Wildlife Reserve in New Zealand

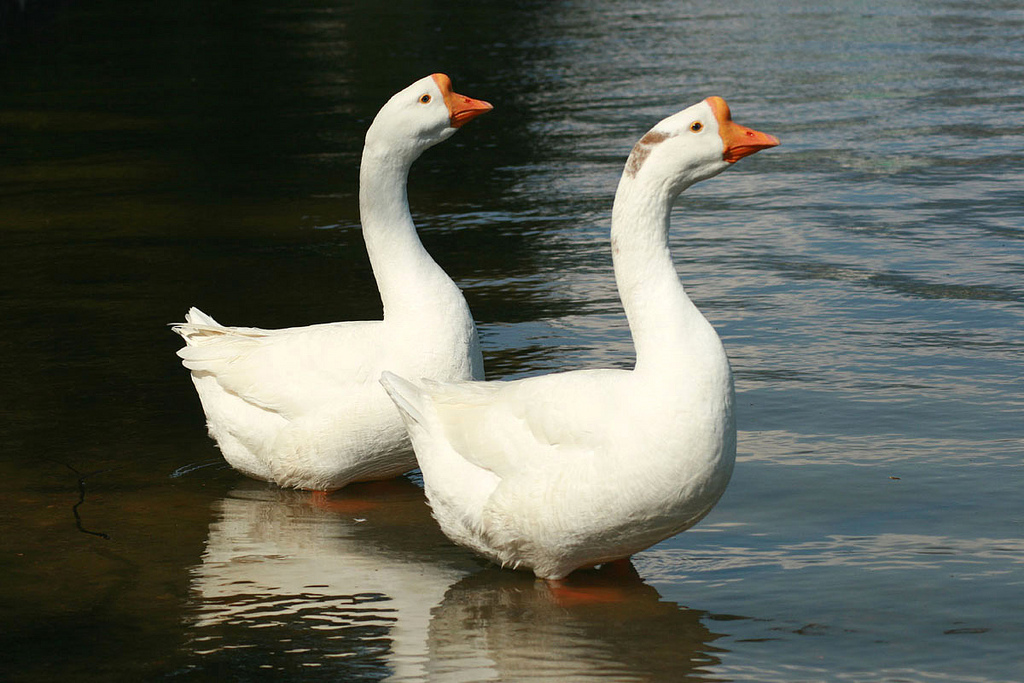
The white goose, in Kyoto, Japan

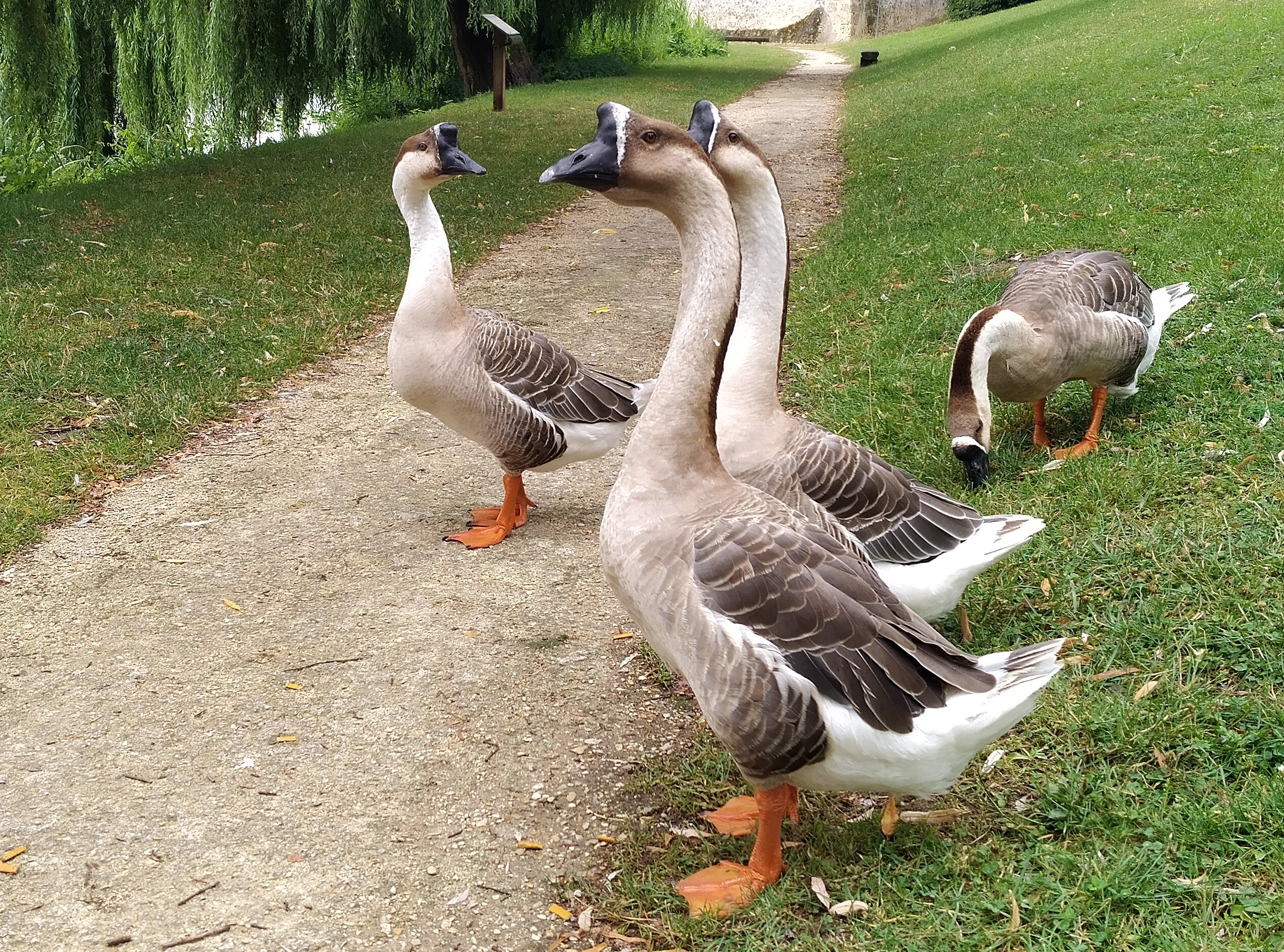
Near the Marne river in Île-de-France

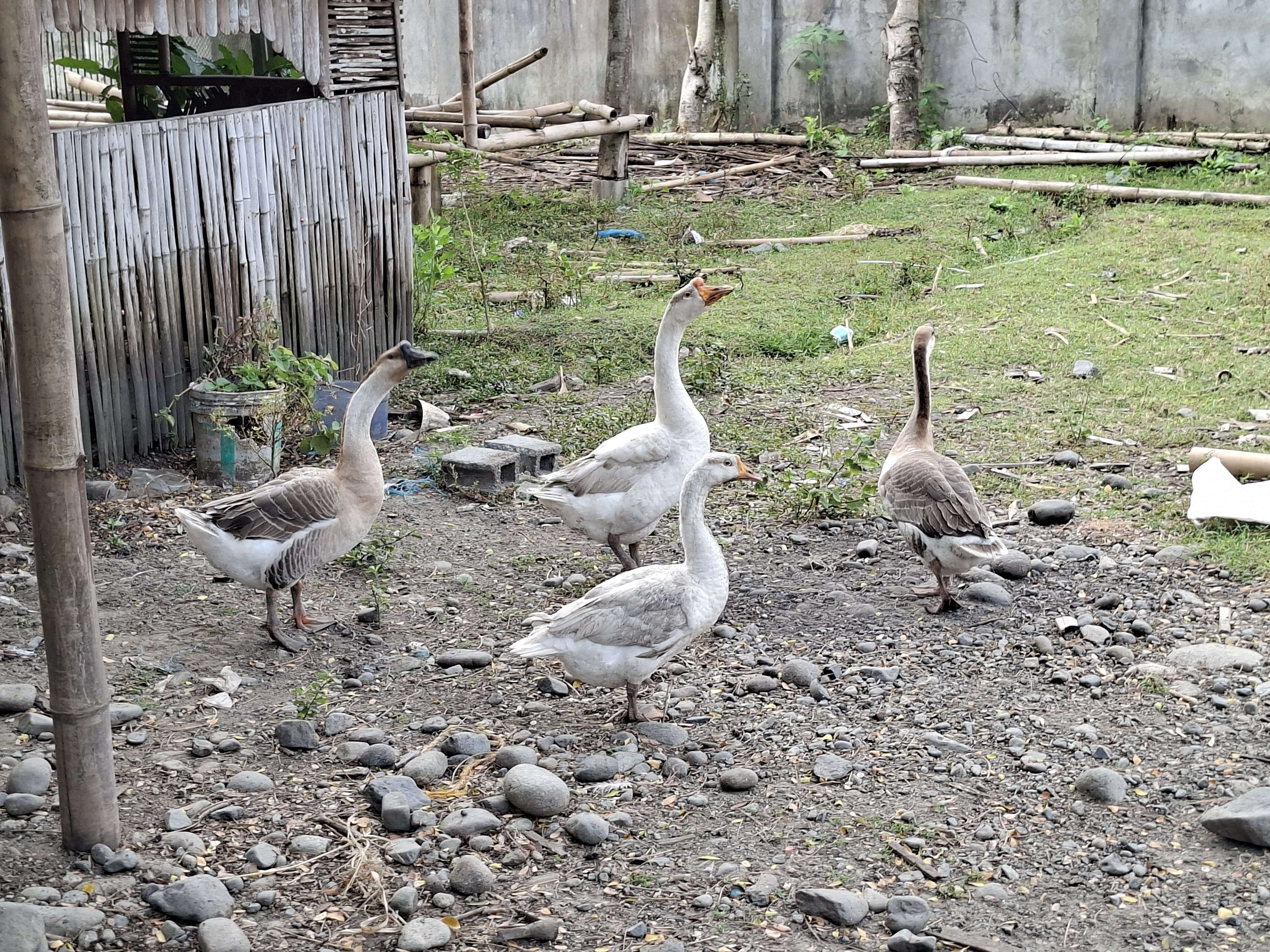
4 Chinese Geese on a farm in Mangatarem, in the Philippines. There is a male and a female of both colours. The females have noticeably smaller knobs than the male geese

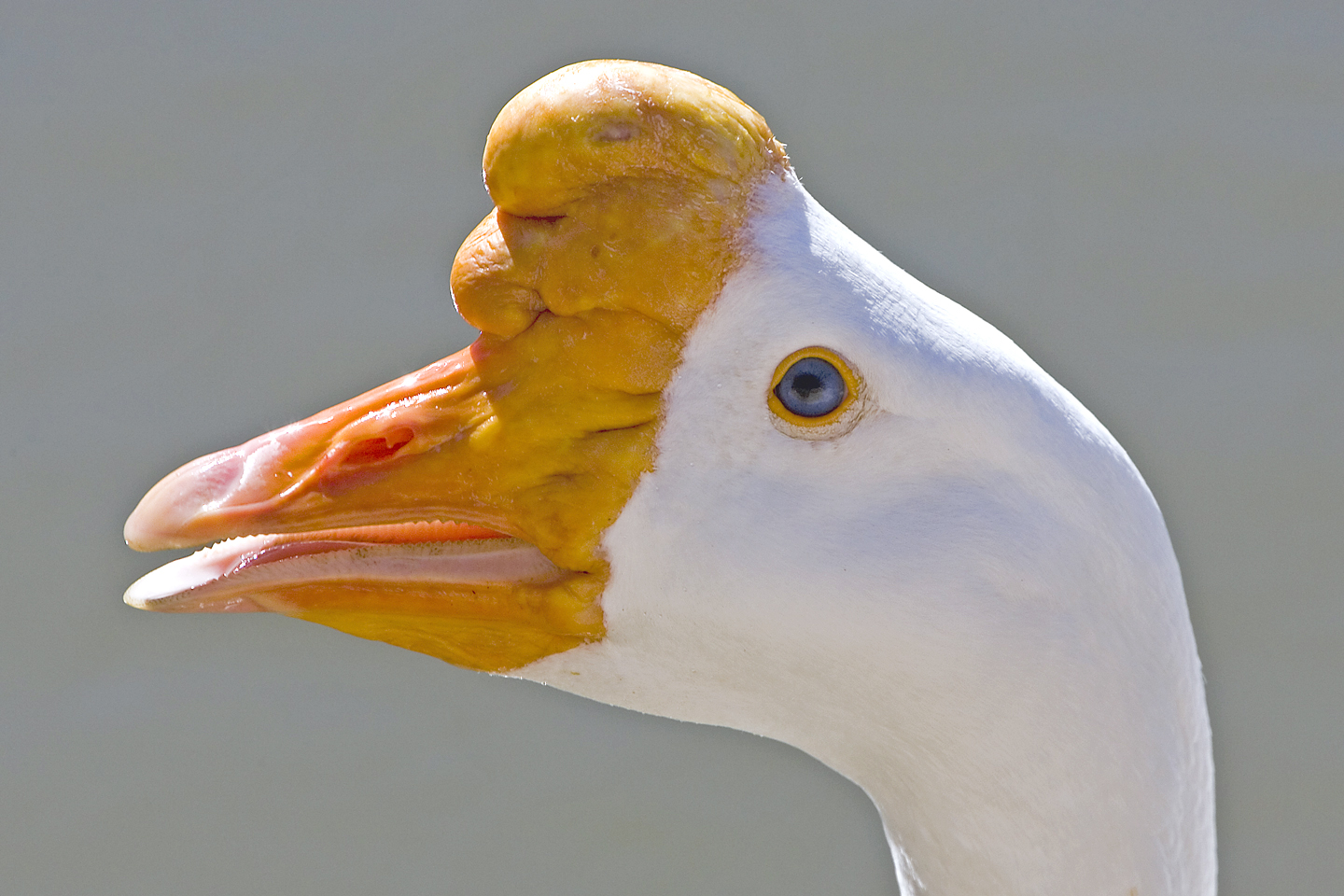
the head of a white variant.

The Chinese Goose is an international breed of domestic goose, known by this name in Europe and in North America. Unlike the majority of goose breeds, it belongs to the knob geese, which derive from Anser cygnoides and are characterised by a prominent basal knob on the upper side of the bill. It originates in China, where there are more than twenty breeds of knob goose.

== History ==
Unlike the majority of goose breeds, which derive from the greylag goose, Anser anser, the Chinese belongs to the knob geese, which derive from the swan goose, Anser cygnoides, and are characterised by a prominent basal knob on the upper side of the bill. As the name suggests, it is believed to have originated in China, where there are more than twenty breeds of knob goose.

It was seen in Britain from the early eighteenth century if not before, and was present in the United States in the latter part of that century – George Washington is believed to have kept some on his plantation at Mount Vernon.

It was included in the revised 1873 edition of The Poultry Book by William Bernhard Tegetmeier, and was added to the Standard of Perfection of the American Poultry Association in 1874.

In the twenty-first century it is an endangered breed: it is reported to DAD-IS by seven countries – Australia, Lithuania, Moldova, the Russian Federation, Slovenia, Suriname and the UK – but none of them report population data. Population data was last reported by the United Kingdom in 2002, when there were between 150 and 1000 birds. The Livestock Conservancy in the United States lists it as watch, its third level of concern.

== Characteristics ==
It appears in two varieties: the grey or brown, with colouring similar to that of the wild Anser cygnoides, and the white. The bill and the knob are black in the grey-brown variety, and orange in the white; the shanks and feet are always orange. In birds bred for showing the neck is long and slender.

== Use ==
As a layer of eggs it is the most prolific of any breed of goose, usually laying some 50–60 eggs in a season of about five months, but sometimes reaching 100 eggs during that time. The eggs weigh about 120 g, rather less than those of other geese. Flocks of the geese may be used to guard property or to keep down weeds.
