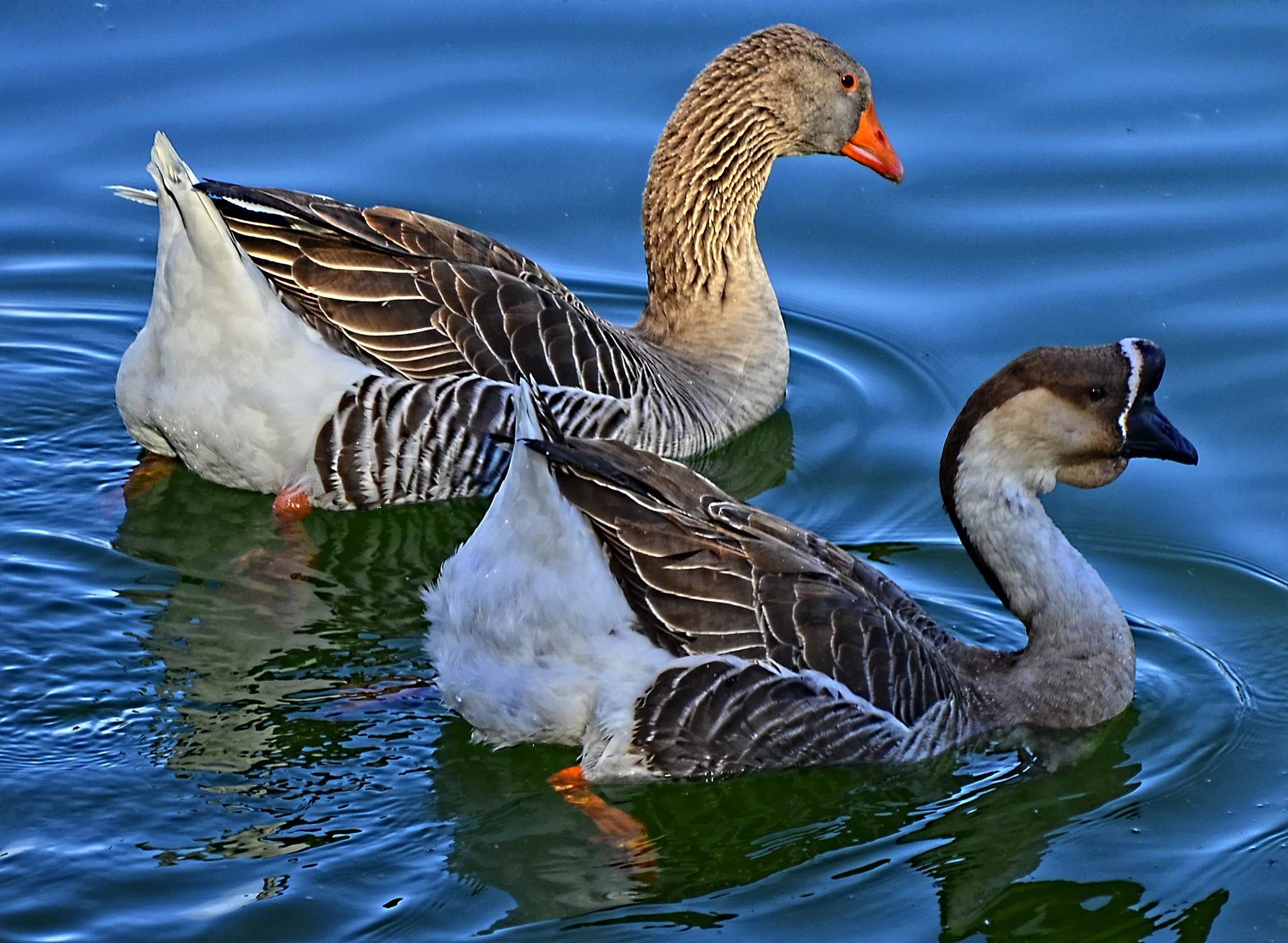
- The two species of domestic goose: one derived from the greylag goose (Anser anser) and the other from the swan goose (Anser cygnoides)

Conservation status
- Domesticated

Scientific classification
- Kingdom: Animalia
- Phylum: Chordata
- Class: Aves
- Order: Anseriformes
- Family: Anatidae
- Tribe: Anserini
- Genus: Anser

Species
- Anser anser; Anser cygnoides

= Domestic goose =

Common name for a bird

A domestic goose is a goose that humans have domesticated and kept for their meat, eggs, or down feathers, or as companion animals. Domestic geese have been derived through selective breeding from the wild greylag goose (Anser anser domesticus) and swan goose (Anser cygnoides domesticus).

== Origins ==
In Europe, northern Africa, and western Asia, the original domesticated geese are derived from the greylag goose, while in eastern Asia, the original domesticated geese are derived from the swan goose; these are commonly known as Chinese geese. Both have been widely introduced in more recent times, and modern flocks in both areas (and elsewhere, such as Australia and North America) may consist of either species or hybrids between them. Domestic swan geese may be readily distinguished from domestic greylag geese by the large knob at the base of the bill, though hybrids may exhibit every degree of variation between the two species.

Charles Darwin remarked in The Variation of Animals and Plants Under Domestication that the domestication of geese is of a very ancient date. The earliest evidence of goose domestication dates back 7,000 years ago to the Hemudu culture of the Lower Yangtze River in China. Archaeological evidence exists for domesticated geese in Egypt more than 4,000 years ago. One proposition holds that geese were domesticated around 3000 BCE in Southeastern Europe, possibly in Greece, but reliable evidence of domestic geese comes from a much later period (eighth century BCE) in the Odyssey.

Another potential domestication site is in Egypt during the Old Kingdom (2686–1991 BCE) due to iconographic evidence of goose exploitation, but this scenario for the original domestication event has been considered less likely. Geese were also herded by ancient Mesopotamians for food and sacrifices and depicted in Mesopotamian art from the early Dynastic Period (2900–2350 BCE) onwards. Certainly, fully domesticated geese were present during the New Kingdom times in Egypt (1552–1151 BCE) and contemporaneously in Europe, and goose husbandry involving several varieties was well established by the Romans by the first century BCE. In the Medieval Period, goose husbandry was at its peak, with large flocks kept by peasants. Archaeological evidence of the domestic goose in northern Europe indicates that it was probably introduced into Scandinavia during the early Iron Age (400 BCE–550 CE).

== Characteristics ==
Domestic geese have been selectively bred for size, with some breeds weighing up to 10 kg (22 lb), compared to the maximum of 3.5 kg (7.7 lb) for the wild swan goose and 4.1 kg (9.0 lb) for the wild greylag goose. This affects their body structure; whereas wild geese have a horizontal posture and slim rear end, domesticated geese lay down large fat deposits toward the tail end, giving a fat rear and forcing the bird into a more upright posture. Although their heavy weight affects their ability to fly, most breeds of domestic geese are capable of flight.

Geese have also been strongly selected for fecundity, with females laying up to 100 eggs per year, compared to 5–12 eggs for a wild goose.

As most domestic geese display little sexual dimorphism, sexing is based primarily on physical characteristics and behaviour. Males are typically taller and larger than females, and have longer, thicker necks. Geese produce large, edible eggs, weighing 120–170 g (4.2–6.0 oz).

Changes to the plumage are variable; many have been selected to lose the dark brown tones of the wild bird. The result is an animal marked, or completely covered in white feathers. Others retain plumage close to the natural; some, such as the modern Toulouse goose, look almost identical to the greylag in plumage, differing only in structure. White geese are often preferred, as they look better plucked and dressed, with any small down feathers remaining being less conspicuous. From the time of the Romans, white geese have been held in great esteem.

Like their wild ancestors, domestic geese are very protective of their offspring and other members of the flock. The male goose, or gander normally places himself between any perceived threat and his family. Owing to their highly aggressive nature, loud call, and sensitivity to unusual movements, geese can contribute towards the security of a property. In late 1950s South Vietnam, the VNAF used flocks of geese to guard their parked aircraft at night due to the noise they would make at intruders. Due to their tendency to make noise when approached by strangers, about 500 geese were used to supplement dogs, drones, and humans to patrol the 533 km boundary between Chongzuo and Vietnam during the COVID-19 pandemic. An official commented that the birds, one of the most common livestock in the region, are sensitive to sounds and can sometimes be more aggressive than dogs.

Because domestic geese descended from the greylag goose are effectively the same species as their wild ancestor (being a subspecies formed through domestication), escaped individuals readily breed with wild populations, resulting in the offspring sometimes resembling either one of their parents, or bearing mixed plumage with patterns of grey and white feathers and orange beaks.

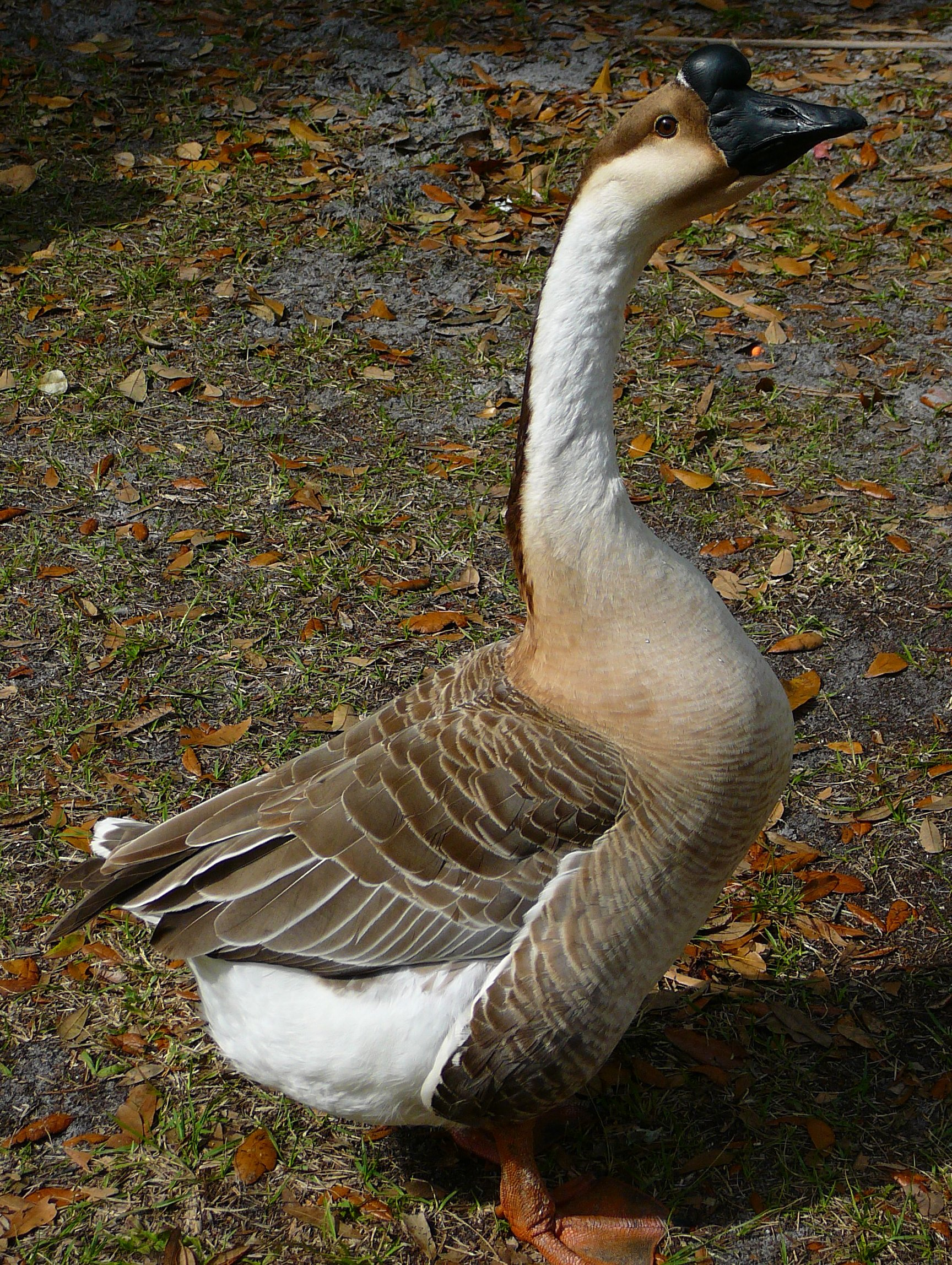
Domestic Chinese goose - erect posture and fat rear end

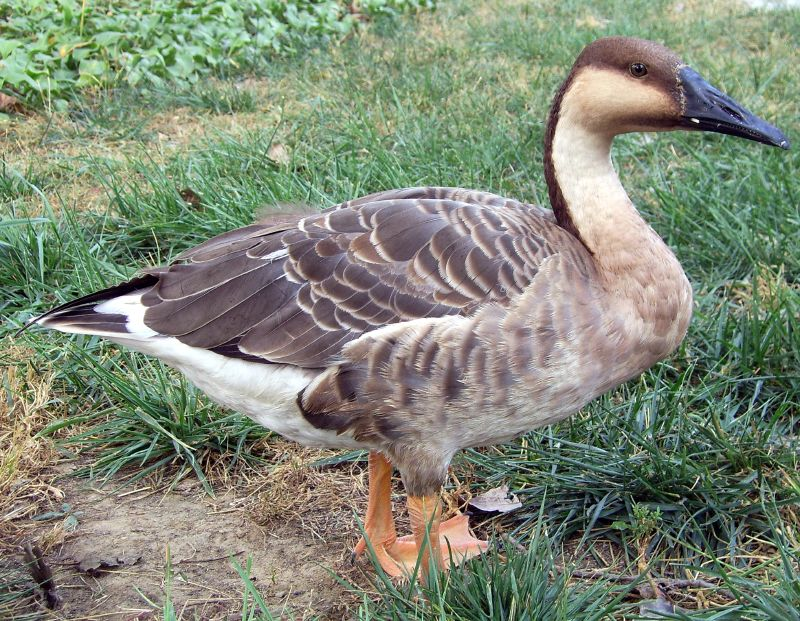
Wild swan goose - horizontal posture and slim rear end

== Culinary uses ==
Geese are important to multiple culinary traditions. The meat, liver and other organs, fat, skin, blood, and eggs are used culinarily in various cuisines. Goose eggs can be used in cooking just like chicken's eggs, though they have proportionally more yolk, and this cooks to a slightly denser consistency. The taste is much the same as that of a chicken egg, but gamier.

== See also ==
- Angel wing – a disease common in geese
- Domestic duck
- List of goose breeds
- Roast goose
- Guard goose
- The 2019 video game Untitled Goose Game, featuring a domestic goose as its protagonist
