= Rhinelander v. Rhinelander =

American court case

- Court: New York Supreme Court, Westchester County
- Full case name: Leonard Rhinelander v. Alice Rhinelander
- Decided: December 5, 1925

Case history
- Appealed to: New York Supreme Court, Appellate Division, Second Department; New York Court of Appeals
- Subsequent actions: Rhinelander v. Rhinelander (New York separation action); Rhinelander v. Rhinelander (Nevada divorce action)

Court membership
- Judge sitting: John Morschauser

Leonard Rhinelander v. Alice Rhinelander was a 1925 marriage annulment case between Kip Rhinelander and Alice Jones. Leonard "Kip" Rhinelander was a scion of the socially prominent and wealthy New York City Rhinelander family.

== Context ==
In the 1920s, interracial marriages in New York State were legal, but rare.

In October 1924, at the age of 21, against his father's wishes, Leonard Rhinelander married Alice Jones, a biracial woman who was a working-class daughter of English immigrants. But one month later, their marriage shocked the nation and became a sensation.

In 1925, the following year, the Rhinelander annulment trial highlighted contemporary strains related to the instability of the upper class, as well as racial anxiety about "passing" as white, at a time when New York was a destination for numerous blacks from the South in the Great Migration and immigrants from Southern and Eastern Europe.

The trial touched on the vague legal definition of the time as to who was to be considered "white" or "colored", alternately portraying race as biologically determined and knowable or as more fluid.

== Rhinelander family ==
In 1903, Leonard Rhinelander was born in Pelham, New York, to Adelaide Brady (née Kip) and Philip Jacob Rhinelander. Nicknamed "Kip" (his mother's maiden name), Rhinelander was the youngest of five children, including four sons and one daughter. The couple's eldest child, Isaac Leonard Kip, died in infancy.

On September 11, 1915, Rhinelander's mother Adelaide died, after sustaining burns when an alcohol lamp on her dressing table exploded.

In 1918, the third son, T.J. Oakley Rhinelander, died in France, while serving in the 107th Regiment during World War I.

The immigrant ancestor of the Rhinelander family in America was Philip Jacob Rhinelander, a German-born French Huguenot who had immigrated to North America in 1686 to escape religious persecution following the revocation of the Edict of Nantes. He immediately settled the same year in the newly formed French Huguenot community of New Rochelle, where he amassed considerable property holdings, the basis for the family's wealth.

The Rhinelanders are considered to have been one of the nation's earliest shipbuilders. The family also had holdings in real estate and owned the Rhinelander Real Estate Company. By the late 19th century, many members of the family were active in philanthropic causes and were active in New York high society.

== Marriage ==
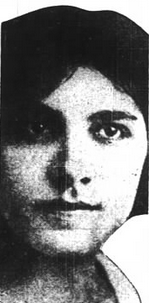
Alice Jones Rhinelander, from a 1924 newspaper.

In September 1921, Rhinelander began a romance with Alice Beatrice Jones, the daughter of a working-class family. The two met while Rhinelander was attending the Orchard School in Stamford, Connecticut, an inpatient clinic where he was seeking treatment to help him overcome extreme shyness and to cure his stuttering.

Jones was a few years older than Rhinelander and the daughter of English immigrants; her mother was white and her father was of mixed race (then termed "mulatto"). It was reported that, during their three-year relationship, Jones's father, George, attempted to dissuade the couple from continuing their romance. George Jones reportedly tried appealing to Rhinelander that his family would never accept his daughter due to their differences in class. Alice Jones would, however, eventually file court papers, denying that her father ever made this attempt.

In February 1922, Rhinelander's father, Philip, attempted to end the relationship by sending his son away to Bermuda on a chaperoned excursion that would separate the couple for two years, as he traveled to Washington, D.C., Havana, Panama and California. In October 1922, Philip Rhinelander placed his son in an Arizona private school. However, the couple kept in contact through letters, as evidenced by letters produced at the trial, and when Leonard Rhinelander turned 21 years old, he returned to New York.

On October 14, 1924, Rhinelander married Jones in a civil ceremony at New Rochelle's city hall. The marriage certificate listed both the groom and the bride as "white". Once Jones's ethnicity came into question, the fact that her marriage license identified her as "white" was reported, implying that she had sought to hide her mixed racial ancestry. During the trial, Jones's attorney asked Leonard Rhinelander whether the city hall clerk who had filled out their marriage license had asked either of them whether they were "white" or "colored". Rhinelander said the clerk had not.

The newlyweds rented an apartment in New Rochelle, ordered furniture, and moved in with Jones's parents in Pelham Manor, while setting up their household. Rhinelander did not tell his family of the marriage, but continued to stay in Manhattan and work at Rhinelander Real Estate Company during the week.

Although the couple attempted to keep their marriage secret — Jones's sister Grace claimed the couple even paid reporters not to announce their marriage — the press soon announced the news of the marriage. Because of the Rhinelanders' fortune and social standing, New Rochelle reporters were eager to learn about Jones's background and began investigating. Reporters discovered that Jones was the daughter of English immigrants and her father, George, was a "colored man". The Rhinelanders got wind that reporters had discovered Jones's heritage and attempted to keep the information out of the papers. According to one article printed in the New York Daily Mirror, the Rhinelanders sent an "agent" to warn the editor of the New Rochelle Standard Star that, if the story was printed, there would be "dire punishment". The editor ignored the threat, and, on November 13, 1924, the New Rochelle Standard Star printed the story with the headline "Rhinelander's Son Marries Daughter of Colored Man".

The New York Evening Post picked up the story but was hesitant to identify Jones' father as black. They instead referred to George Jones as being "West Indian". Other papers picked up the story, but most were also careful to omit the racial angle, choosing instead of focus on the differences in Rhinelander's and Jones’s social class. In a number of newspapers, Jones was variously identified as a nanny, a nurse or a laundress.

Other media accounts referred to the jobs of Jones’s family; her father was identified as a cab driver or stagecoach driver and her uncle as a butler, which at the time were understood to be positions held mainly by black people (Smith-Pryor 2009, pp. 124–125). The Hearst-owned tabloid New York Daily Mirror, however, ran a front-page banner headline "RHINELANDER WEDS NEGRESS/Society dumbfounded". The black newspaper The Pittsburgh Courier referred to both parties' races, with the front-page headline "Caucasian '400' Stunned Over Marriage of White Millionaire to Colored Beauty". Most larger city papers were wary of printing such a scandalous story, however, deferential to or fearful of the Rhinelanders' wealth and prominent social status.

== Annulment trial ==
For a time, Rhinelander stood by his wife during the intense national coverage of their marriage. After two weeks under a threat of disinheritance, however, he succumbed to his family's demands that he leave Jones and signed an annulment complaint that his father's lawyers had prepared. The document asserted that Jones had intentionally deceived Rhinelander by hiding her true race and had passed as a white woman. Jones' attorney denied Rhinelander's claim on her behalf, saying that her mixed race was obvious. Rhinelander later said that Jones hadn't deceived him outright but did so by letting him believe she was white.

The ensuing annulment trial in White Plains was known as Rhinelander v. Rhinelander and attracted national attention. Rhinelander's attorney was Isaac N. Mills, a former New York Supreme Court justice. Jones retained a former protégé of Mills, Lee Parsons Davis. The jury was all-white and all-male. Jones's attorney Davis said openly that his client and Rhinelander had engaged in sex before they were married; he read love letters written by Rhinelander that detailed the couple's intimate sexual activity.

Davis contended that Rhinelander had seen Jones' "dusky" breasts and legs, thus making it impossible for him not to have known that Jones was biracial. He also showed that Rhinelander had clearly pursued her, overturning Mills' presentation of Rhinelander as having been bewitched by an older woman. In an unusual turn, blackface performer Al Jolson was called to testify that he did not have an affair with Jones, after a letter was disclosed at the trial in which she said she heard from a co-worker that Jolson was a "flirt":

It was a year-long event marked by several bizarre developments, including rumors of bribery and extortion, public reading of Leonard's love-letters, the partial disrobing of the defendant so that the jurors could examine her skin.

The trial was notorious for Jones being asked to display a portion of her body to the jury in the judge's chambers. Wearing a coat over underwear, she dropped the coat to the top of her breasts so they could see her shoulders; then she pulled it up so they could see her lower legs. The question of "whiteness" was not litigated, but this was Davis's attempt to show what Rhinelander would have seen. (245 N.Y. 510). The jury viewed her shoulders, back, and legs, concluding that she was indeed "colored" and that Rhinelander had to have been aware that she had some black ancestry, and thus could be reasonably sure that she had not tried to deceive him about her racial identity. The judge barred reporters from seeing the demonstration to prevent any photographs. The tabloid newspaper New York Evening Graphic, which had regularly used composographs to depict various events, usually salacious in nature, created a photograph depicting a model stripped to the waist with her back to the camera being viewed by a group of lawyers and one woman in a courtroom. The photo ran on the front page of the Evening Graphic and boosted the paper's circulation.

After weighing all the evidence, the jury ruled in Jones' favor. The annulment Rhinelander requested was denied and the marriage was upheld:

Alice's court victory may have been enabled by the fact that Alice performed her racial identity as the all-white, male, married jurors expected of a colored woman, and that Leonard failed to perform his racial, gender, and class identities as expected of him as a white, wealthy gentleman.

Deception was a necessary element of the alleged fraud, however, and Davis had shown the jurors Jones's dark skin, and Rhinelander's testimony and letters proved he had seen her unclothed body many times before the marriage, making it clear she had not deceived him about her race.

Rhinelander's legal team executed a series of appeals, first to the Appellate Division, and then the Court of Appeals, but the verdict was consistently upheld. He disappeared from public view but was eventually discovered living in Nevada, in July 1929. Rhinelander was using the assumed name "Lou Russell", had grown a mustache, put on weight, and was working as a woodcutter. Jones remained in New York where she filed a separation suit against Rhinelander, charging him with abandonment and his father with interference with the marriage.

In December 1929, Rhinelander was granted a divorce by default in Las Vegas. The divorce was not recognized in New York, where Jones still had a separation suit pending.

Rhinelander and Jones eventually reached a settlement in the separation suit. Rhinelander was ordered to pay Jones a lump sum of US$32,500 (equivalent to $626,000 in 2025) and US$3,600 a year (equivalent to $69,400 in 2025) for the remainder of her life, or US$300 a month (equivalent to $5,800 in 2025), which was never adjusted for inflation. In return, Jones forfeited all claims to the Rhinelander estate and agreed not to use the Rhinelander name or to speak publicly or write about her story. She honored those terms for the rest of her life. After her death, however, the name on her tombstone was inscribed as "Alice J. Rhinelander".

== Later years ==
Leonard "Kip" Rhinelander eventually returned to New York, where he worked as an auditor for his family's company, the Rhinelander Real Estate Company. He never remarried.

On February 20, 1936, at the age of 32, Rhinelander died of lobar pneumonia at his father's home in Long Beach, New York.

After Rhinelander's death, his father, Philip, followed the advice of the family attorney and continued to pay Jones her yearly settlement money. When Philip died four years later in March 1940, at age 74, he left his multimillion-dollar estate to his lone surviving child, Adelaide, two nieces, and two granddaughters. Adelaide promptly stopped the quarterly payments. The disbursements accounted for only 0.04 percent of the total estate, but Philip Rhinelander's heirs opposed them as "an onerous demand for life support". Jones took the heirs to court. After two years of court battles, the New York Supreme Court upheld the original settlement agreement, and the heirs resumed Jones's payments.

After her final court battle with the Rhinelanders, Alice Jones remained out of the public eye. She also never remarried; she continued to live with her parents in Pelham Manor until their deaths.

Alice Jones died in a Westchester County hospital on September 13, 1989, of a heart attack caused by a stroke and hypertension. Her bank account contained US$25,000 (equivalent to $65,000 in 2025), and she owned a one-third interest in her family home on Pelham Road, worth about US$70,000 (equivalent to $234,000 in 2025). Her death certificate indicated that she had been hospitalized for nearly a year. The name on her tombstone was "Alice Rhinelander".

== In the arts ==
The case's depiction of interracial marriage influenced some of the literature and art of this period. The writer Nella Larsen, in her novel Passing (1929), tells the story of Clare Kendry, a biracial woman who passes as white and marries a white man. She passes in order to get away from the racism of her own aunts, who allow her to live in poverty, which leaves her to face problems of both race and class, both of which arose in the Rhinelander case. In the novel, Clare marries John Bellew, a wealthy white man, who is not aware of her true racial identity.

The literature as well as the Rhinelander case explore the complexity of racial identity in a public institution such as marriage. The Rhinelander case appears in two of Oscar Micheaux's films: The House Behind the Cedars (1927) and Thirty Years Later (1928).

The case served as the basis for the movie Night of the Quarter Moon (1959), starring Julie London and John Drew Barrymore.

Denny S. Bryce wrote a historical fiction novel about Jones, The Trial of Mrs. Rhinelander (2024).

== Bibliography ==
=== Case citation ===
- Leonard Rhinelander v. Alice Rhinelander; 219 A.D. 189; 219 N.Y.S. 548; Supreme Court of New York, Appellate Division, Second Department (1927).

=== Sources ===
- Allen, Anita L. (2003). Why privacy isn't everything : feminist reflections on personal accountability. Rowman & Littlefield. ISBN 0-742-51409-9.
- Ardizzone, Heidi; Lewis, Earl (2002). Love on Trial: An American Scandal in Black and White. W. W. Norton & Company. ISBN 0-393-32309-9.
- Carlson, A. Cheree. (1999) "'You Know It When You See It:' The Rhetorical Hierarchy of Race and Gender in Rhinelander V. Rhinelander." Quarterly Journal of Speech 85 (1999): 111–128, (subscription required).
- Ehlers, Nadine (December 2004). "Hidden in Plain Sight: Defying Juridical Racialization in Rhinelander v. Rhinelander". Communication and Critical/Cultural Studies. 1 (4): 313–334. doi:10.1080/1479142042000270458. S2CID 144431074 – via Ingenta Connect.
- Greene, Richard Henry (1940), The New York Genealogical and Biographical Record, vol. 71, New York Genealogical and Biographical Society
- Johnson, Kevin R. (2003). Mixed Race America and the Law: A Reader. NYU Press. ISBN 0-814-74257-2.
- Smith-Pryor, Elizabeth M. (2002). Property Rites: The Rhinelander Trial, Passing, and the Protection of Whiteness. Univ of North Carolina Press. ISBN 0-807-83268-5.
- "Reprimand". Time Magazine. December 7, 1925. Archived from the original on February 19, 2012. (Subscription required.)
- "Reply". Time Magazine. January 18, 1926. (Subscription required.)
