= Marriage of Edward and Peaches Browning =

1926 publicized marriage

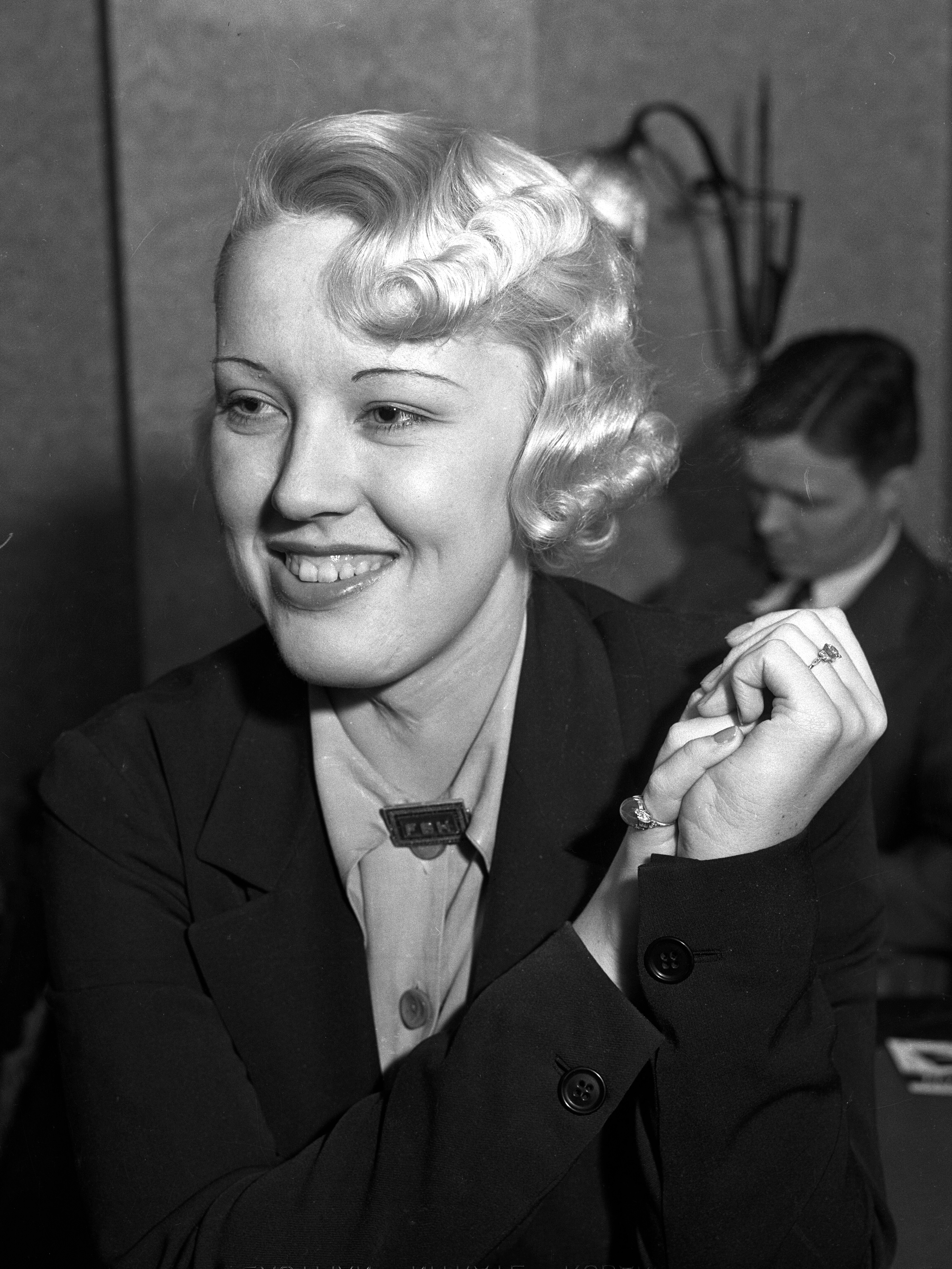
- Frances in 1935
- Date: April 10, 1926
- Location: Westchester County, New York
- Participants: Frances “Peaches” Browning; Edward W. "Daddy" Browning

Real estate multimillionaire and magnate Edward W. "Daddy" Browning married Textile High School student Frances Heenan “Peaches” Browning in Westchester County, New York, on April 10, 1926. Edward was 51 and Frances was 15. The marriage, according to University of Northern Colorado historian Nicholas L. Syrett, "redefined the terms by which many Americans (and indeed international observers) understood child marriage".

Following the publicization of the event, Frances suffered an acid attack by an unidentified attacker. Edward, who would be worth about $300 million if adjusted for 2012, bought her multiple lavish gifts, including 179 coats, 60 dresses and an African goose. They went to live at Edward's residence in Kew Gardens. Frances returned to the house of her mother, who had earlier approved the marriage, in October. She later separated from Edward without a divorce.

Frances died from a domestic accident in 1956. She was described by the New York Times as a "symbol of the Twenties". Edward died at the age of 59 in his mansion at Scarsdale, after surviving a cerebral hemorrhage. The marriage, one of the most publicized celebrity events of the Roaring Twenties in the United States, was described by the New York Magazine in 2012 as "one of the most sensational news stories in post-World War I America". A book about the event by American jurist Michael M. Greenburg, titled Peaches & Daddy, was published in 2008.

== History ==
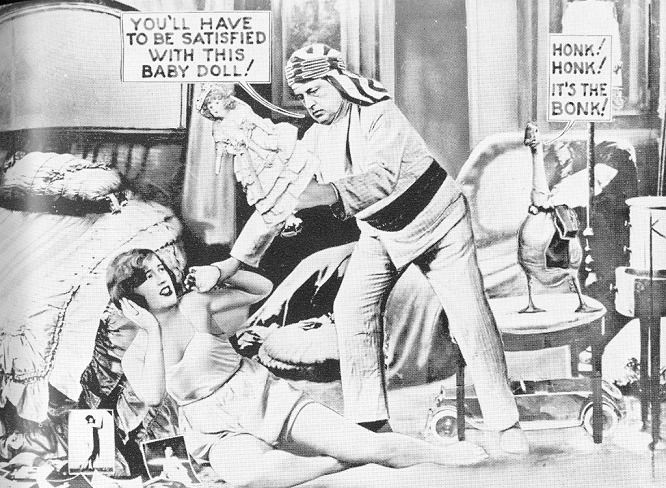
A composograph of Peaches and "Daddy" Browning created by the New York Evening Graphic.

Browning and Heenan met at a sorority dance on the evening of March 5, 1926, at the Hotel McAlpin and immediately began a very public courtship, despite the difference in their ages. Browning was 51, and Heenan was 15. Browning, who reveled in publicity, paraded Heenan in front of the paparazzi cameras as he lavished her with expensive gifts (spending $1000 a day on shopping trips) and took her to New York's finest restaurants in his distinctive peacock blue Rolls-Royce automobile. On April 10, 1926, mere weeks after they met, Peaches and "Daddy" were wed in the village of Cold Spring, New York, far from media scrutiny. Both Peaches' father and her mother gave their permission for the marriage, which took place in part to thwart a campaign by Vincent Pisarra of the New York Society for the Prevention of Cruelty to Children to halt their relationship. Peaches was the victim of an acid attack shortly before her wedding from an unidentified perpetrator.

On October 2, 1926, Peaches and her mother loaded up their belongings and left the marital residence at the Kew Gardens Inn. Under New York law at the time, divorce was only possible if one party admitted adultery, so Peaches tried to obtain a legal separation, claiming cruelty. The White Plains, New York, trial drew intense coverage by New York City tabloid newspapers such as the New York Daily News, the rival New York Daily Mirror and the more disreputable New York Graphic, which published a series of notorious composographs of the couple. Among the notable aspects of the case were Peaches' allegations of odd behavior by her husband, including the fact that he kept a honking African goose in their bedroom. The phrase "Don't be a goof", which Daddy allegedly used as an insult to Peaches, came into national vogue, and later turned up in the lyrics of the title song from the 1936 Rodgers and Hart musical comedy On Your Toes. The affair is referenced in the 1927 Gershwin musical comedy Funny Face and F. Scott Fitzgerald's short story "The Love Boat", published the same year.

The judge accepted Daddy's version of the facts, ruling that Peaches had abandoned her husband without cause, and permitted him a legal separation without any obligation to pay alimony. Peaches remained legally married to Browning until his death from a brain hemorrhage. She went on to have and divorce three more husbands. She also had an affair with Milton Berle.

Peaches' notoriety gained her a career in vaudeville. She was managed by Marvin Welt (1883–1953), one of the first theatrical agents to demand a percentage of total ticket sales for some of his clients. She died at New York Hospital in Manhattan on August 23, 1956, at age 46, after slipping in the bathroom at her apartment. She was buried in the Ferncliff Cemetery in Hartsdale, New York.
