= Zan Stewart =

American musician and critic (born 1944)

Zan Stewart (born March 29, 1944) is an American jazz writer, musician and former disc jockey.

== Life and career ==
Born in Los Angeles, California, Stewart is the son of Cassius Lynford Stewart (1907–1997) and Elizabeth LeGrange Wilbur Stewart (1904–1992). In the 1930s and 1940s, his father was as an accountant for such Los Angeles area film studios as Universal, Eagle Lion and RKO, working on films that included two directed by Howard Hawks: The Thing (From Another World) and The Big Sky. Later, he was an auditor for Ventura County, California, treasurer of Ojai Festivals, Ltd., and producer of jazz concerts for the Festivals, and, with Gene Lees and Fred Hall, of several seasons of Jazz At Ojai, for which he designed the event's logo. A musician, he played piano—he studied with the fine pianist Theo Saunders—and guitar, and was also a cartoonist, whose works appeared in the Ojai, California-based Ojai Valley Voice. Stewart's mother, whose stage name was Elizabeth Wilbur, was an actress from the late 1920s until the 1940s, appearing on stage, in two films -- "Bonnie Scotland" (1934) and "Robin Hood of El Dorado" (1936) -- and on radio, including roles on Cecil B. DeMille's "Lux Radio Theater." Stewart's maternal grandmother was the playwright Helen Hannah Wilbur (1878–1937), who wrote numerous plays under the name Elene Wilbur and also contributed scripts for the Christian Science radio program, "Courage Corner."

=== Jazz writing ===
Stewart became fascinated with jazz as a teenager growing up in Ojai, California, where he moved with his parents in 1955, and was introduced to jazz journalism through extensive reading of Down Beat magazine, to which he would later contribute, beginning in the 1980s. He first contributed jazz writing to Paul Afeldt's Ventura, California-based Jazz Review while still in high school, then began his professional career in 1975 with a bi-weekly column for the Santa Barbara (Ca.) News and Review. (He graduated from the University of California Santa Barbara with a BA in Film Studies in 1974.) After moving to Los Angeles in 1977, he started writing for the L.A. Weekly in 1979, which brought him to the attention of Los Angeles Times jazz critic Leonard Feather, who brought him on the paper in 1980, where he was later mentored by arts editor Fred Crafts. Stewart wrote features for the L.A. Times, including a weekly "Jazz Notes" column, as well as reviews of performances and recordings, jazz listings, and more. His colleagues included jazz writer Don Heckman and noted food writers Colman Andrews, a friend since adolescence in Ojai, and Ruth Reichl.

Stewart has also written for Down Beat, Jazz Life, Swing Journal, Jazziz, Musica Jazz, and, from 2002 to 2010, the Newark Star-Ledger, New Jersey's largest newspaper, from which he retired in 2010. During his writing career, he interviewed such major jazz artists as Miles Davis, Dizzy Gillespie, Horace Silver, Joe Henderson, Barry Harris, Wayne Shorter and Ornette Coleman. Stewart has written liner notes to more than 200 albums and box sets. In 1994, he received a Certificate of Commendation from the City of Los Angeles, and a Jazz Communicator Award from the Los Angeles Jazz Society. In 1996, he was a recipient of the ASCAP-Deems Taylor Award in recognition of his liner notes to Eric Dolphy: The Complete Prestige Recordings. His interviews are in two books: "The Quincy Jones Interview," included in "Down Beat Magazine's The Great Jazz Interviews, a 75th Anniversary Anthology,"; and "Ornette Coleman: Interviewed by Zan Stewart and Howard Shore," Shuffle Boil, No. 7.

=== Musical career ===
Stewart's interest in instrumental music began with piano studies at age 5, followed by clarinet at the age of six, and saxophone at the age of 15. His musical career began in earnest as a tenor saxophonist in Santa Barbara in 1975, where he played in two bands, Crescent and Steamroller, the latter with noted drummer Gary Frommer. In Los Angeles, he led ensembles and performed at such venues as LeCafe, Pedrini Music, At My Place, and Jax. He was also heard regularly with saxophonists Pat Britt—who produced recordings by such notables as saxophonists Sonny Stitt and George Coleman—and Wilbur Brown—who had played with singer/pianist Ray Charles, saxophonist Hank Crawford, trumpeter Kenny Dorham and pianist Red Garland, among many others—at the Cat and Fiddle Pub in Hollywood. The Cat & Fiddle was owned by bassist Kim Gardner, a noted English rock musician who played with the likes of Eric Clapton, George Harrison and Rod Stewart, and co-led Ashton, Gardner & Dyke. While living in the Eastern U.S., Stewart played at Smalls in New York City, and Shanghai Jazz, Trumpets Jazz Club and Cecil's Jazz Club in New Jersey. Currently residing in the San Francisco Bay Area, he has played Club Deluxe in San Francisco, the 7 Mile House in Brisbane, at Nick's Lounge and Mythos Fine Art in Berkeley, Osteria Divino in Sausalito, and Terrapin Crossroads in San Rafael. In 2014 he released his debut CD, The Street Is Making Music (MoboDog Records), which has received substantial U.S. and international airplay and several positive reviews. In 2015, Zan played solo tenor saxophone alongside poets David Meltzer, who first read his poetry to jazz in the late 1950s in San Francisco, and Julie Rogers in recording "Two-Tone - Poetry & Jazz" (Pureland Audio).

He names Sonny Rollins and Charlie Parker as a principal influences, and also cites Dexter Gordon, Miles Davis, Thelonious Monk, Lee Morgan, Herbie Hancock, John Coltrane, and Fats Navarro as models.

Among the musicians Stewart has performed with are pianists Albert Dailey, Gildo Mahones, Freddie Redd, Keith Saunders, Art Hillery, and Tardo Hammer; guitarists Bob DeVos and Dave Stryker; bassists Paul Gill, Louis Spears, Bill Moring, John Wiitala, Adam Gay, and Mike Karn; drummers Clarence Johnston, Roy McCurdy, Jimmy Cobb, Ron Marabuto, Tony Reedus, Steve Johns, and Tim Horner; and saxophonists Wilbur Brown, Pat Britt, Frank Morgan, Joe Lovano, Dewey Redman, and Grant Stewart.

=== Disc jockey ===
Stewart was a disc jockey from 1964 to 1982, first on the UCSB station, KCSB-FM. He joined both KOVA-FM (Ojai, Ca,) and KTMS-FM (Santa Barbara) in the mid-1970s, and was later heard on two Los Angeles area radio stations: KBCA-FM (later KKGO), 1977 to 1980; and KCRW, 1980 to 1982.

Stewart is a member of the American Society of Composers, Authors and Publishers (ASCAP).
