= Peskin =

Peskin is a surname. Notable people with the surname include:

- Aaron Peskin (born 1964), American politician
- Charles S. Peskin (born 1946), American mathematician
- Hy Peskin (1915–2005), American photographer
- Michael Peskin (born 1951), American theoretical physicist
