= Jazz journalism =

Term applied to American sensational newspapers in the 1920s

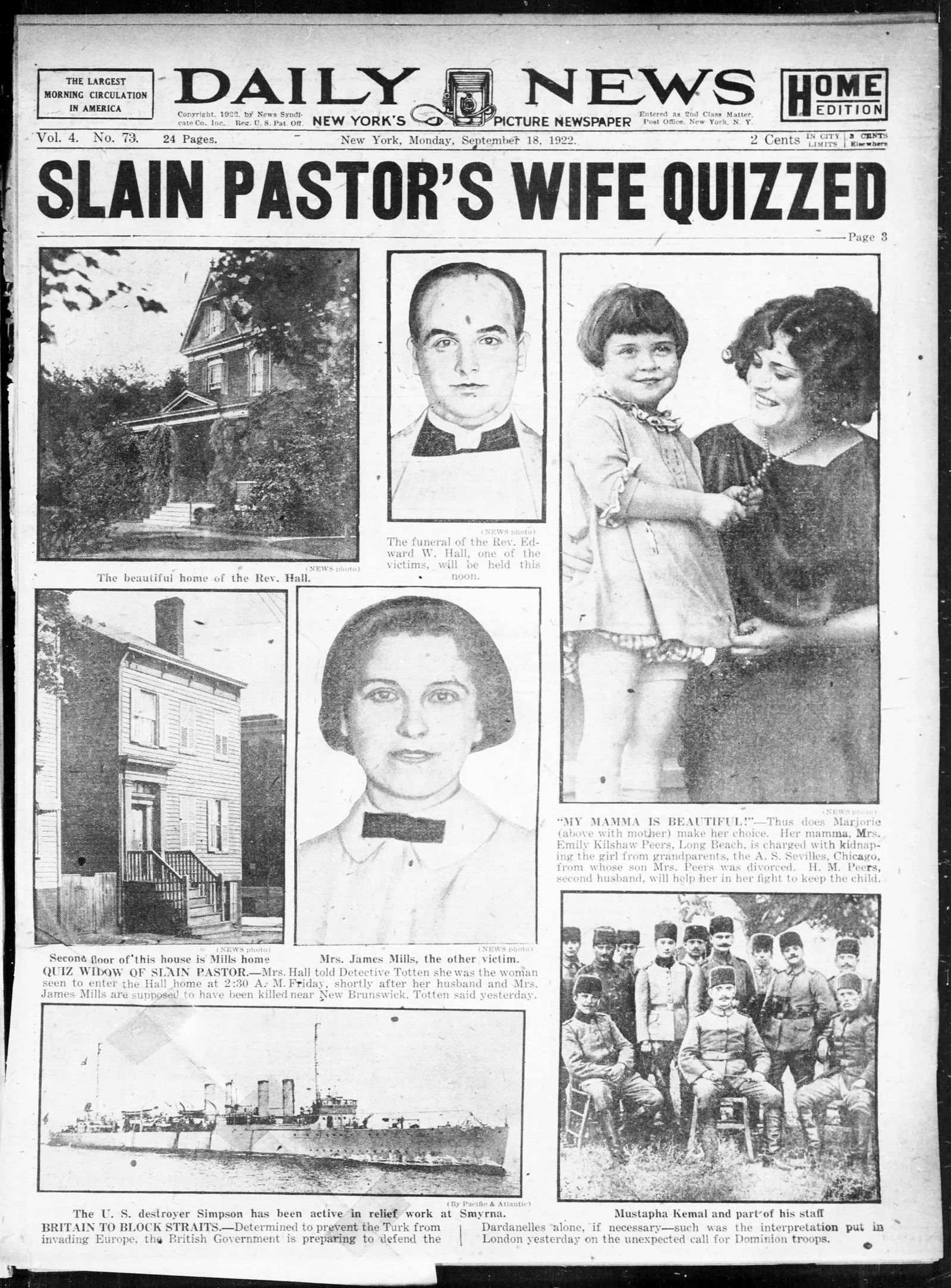
Example front page of the New York Daily News

Jazz journalism was a term applied to American sensational newspapers in the 1920s. Focused on entertainment, celebrities, sports, scandal and crime, the style was a New York phenomenon, practiced primarily by three new tabloid-size daily newspapers in a fight for circulation. Convenient for readers on subways, the small-format papers were designed to display large page one photographs and headlines for newsstand sales. The tabloids' popularity was controversial, but also influenced the city's and nation's more traditional media, especially when columnist Walter Winchell became popular both in print and on the air.

Jazz journalism was a sensationalist style of news that matched its era, the rebellious Roaring Twenties, a dramatic change from the somber news of World War I. The new tabloid newspapers featured provocative headlines and photographs, and stories about entertainment celebrities, sex scandals, and murder trials.

== History ==
The beginning of jazz journalism was Joseph Medill Patterson's New York Daily News in 1919. It was followed in 1924 by William Randolph Hearst's New York Daily Mirror and Bernarr Macfadden's New York Evening Graphic. As Hearst and the late Joseph Pulitzer had done with broadsheet yellow journalism a quarter-century earlier, the new tabloid journalism battled for circulation with increasingly dramatic page one images and bold headlines. All three New York tabloids emphasized celebrity, scandal, the entertainment world, crime and violence. Broadway and Hollywood entertainment celebrities and the nightclub, music and crime cultures of prohibition were a bigger focus in the tabloids then civic affairs or international news.

Many of the visual storytelling innovations were controversial. The Evening Graphic invented the "composograph," a composite news photo illustration created in a studio and art department to illustrate stories for which a real photograph could not be taken, such as actor Rudolph Valentino on a hospital operating table, or a private Broadway party featuring a nude chorus girl in a champagne-filled bathtub. When Valentino died in 1926, a composite was made of him in Heaven standing next to opera singer Enrico Caruso, who had died in 1921. In one of the most famous photographs of the era, with a camera strapped to his ankle, reporter Tom Howard of the Daily News secretly took a photograph of Ruth Snyder in the execution chamber as she was being electrocuted at Sing Sing prison in 1928 after being convicted of murder.

Among the most notable jazz journalism reporters of the time were Walter Winchell, who began as Broadway columnist in the Evening Graphic, his successor Ed Sullivan, who previously had been the paper's sports editor, and entertainment gossip columnists Louella Parsons, and Hedda Hopper. The tabloids were edited for entertainment, and links between the two worlds went beyond the headlines: Winchell was a vaudeville performer before he turned to journalism, Parsons was a movie script writer and Hopper had been an actress. Parsons, who wrote for the Los Angeles Examiner and the New York American, was known for discovering the secrets of celebrities. Winchell moved on from the Graphic to the New York Mirror and to radio. Sullivan went on to the New York Daily News and, eventually, to television.

== Business ==
Advertisements, which were important for these newspapers, were often for soaps, creams, ointments, and tonics. Advertising revenue for newspapers from 1915–1929 tripled from $275 million to $800 million because of the commercial impact the papers had on readers.
