= Hartford Courant =

Daily newspaper in Connecticut, US

- Front page of the March 28, 2024, edition
- Type: Weekly newspaper (until 1837); Daily newspaper (since 1837)
- Format: Broadsheet
- Owner: Tribune Publishing
- Editor: Helen Bennett
- Founded: October 29, 1764; 262 years ago (as the Connecticut Courant)
- Headquarters: PO Box 569; Hartford, CT 06141
- Country: United States
- Circulation: 15,500 Average print circulation 7,300 Digital Subscribers
- ISSN: 1047-4153
- OCLC number: 8807834
- Website: courant.com

The Hartford Courant is the largest daily newspaper in the U.S. state of Connecticut, and is the oldest continuously published newspaper in the United States. A morning newspaper serving most of the state north of New Haven and east of Waterbury, its headquarters on Broad Street in Hartford, Connecticut, was a short walk from the state capitol. It reports regional news with a chain of bureaus in smaller cities and a series of local editions. It also operates CTNow, a free local weekly newspaper and website.

The Courant began as a weekly called the Connecticut Courant on October 29, 1764, becoming daily in 1837. In 1979, it was bought by the Times Mirror Company. In 2000, Times Mirror was acquired by the Tribune Company, which later combined the paper's management and facilities with those of a Tribune-owned Hartford television station. The Courant and other Tribune print properties were spun off to a new corporate parent, Tribune Publishing, separate from the station, in 2014. In 2020 printing operations ceased in Hartford and were outsourced to Springfield, MA. At the height of the COVID-19 pandemic in December 2020, all Hartford Courant staff permanently vacated the offices to work from home, and later in 2022 the printing press was dismantled and sold for scrap. Tribune Publishing agreed in May 2021 to be acquired by Alden Global Capital, which operates its media properties through Digital First Media. The transaction was finalized on May 25, 2021. While Alden Global Capital had purchased the building on 285 Broad St. in Hartford for $6.9 million in 2018 through an LLC it was tied to, the building was put up for absolute auction in November 2025 and officially sold in December 2025 for US$725,000.

== History ==
=== Origins and leading figures ===
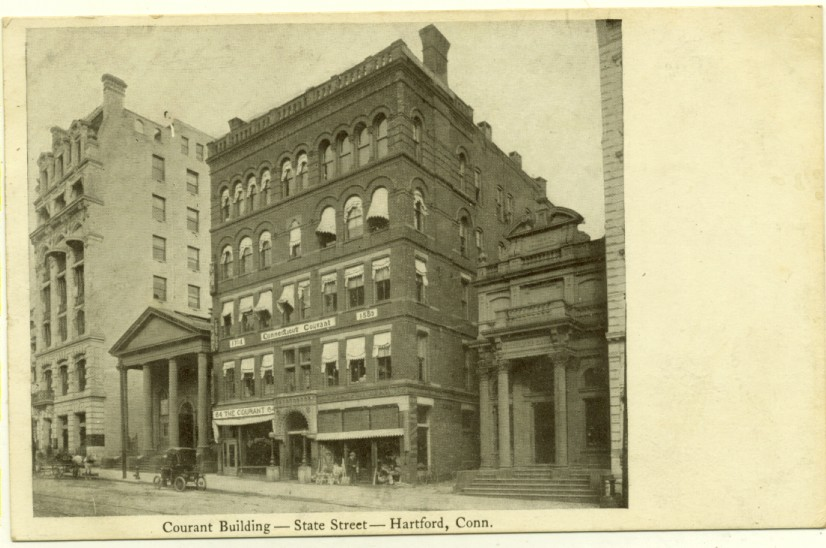
Courant building on State Street (about 1900)

According to the Library of Congress' database of U.S. newspapers, the origins of the Hartford Courant intertwines with the publication of the weekly Connecticut Courant. Founded by Thomas Green, the Connecticut Courant was first published on October 29, 1764. In the years following 1774, the title of the paper would be changed to The Connecticut Courant and Hartford Weekly Intelligencer, later simplified to The Connecticut Courant, and the Weekly Intelligencer (1778 to 1791), then reverted to the original form The Connecticut Courant from 1791 to 1914, when the publication ceased.

In 1837, John L. Boswell, who had become the printer proprietor of The Connecticut Courant the previous year (until 1849), also started the publication of The Daily Courant. In 1840, the title would be changed to The Hartford Daily Courant, to finally become The Hartford Courant in 1887. Based on the notion that the daily publication was an offshoot of the weekly Connecticut Courant, the newspaper board adopted in 2018 the motto "Older than the nation" as its slogan.

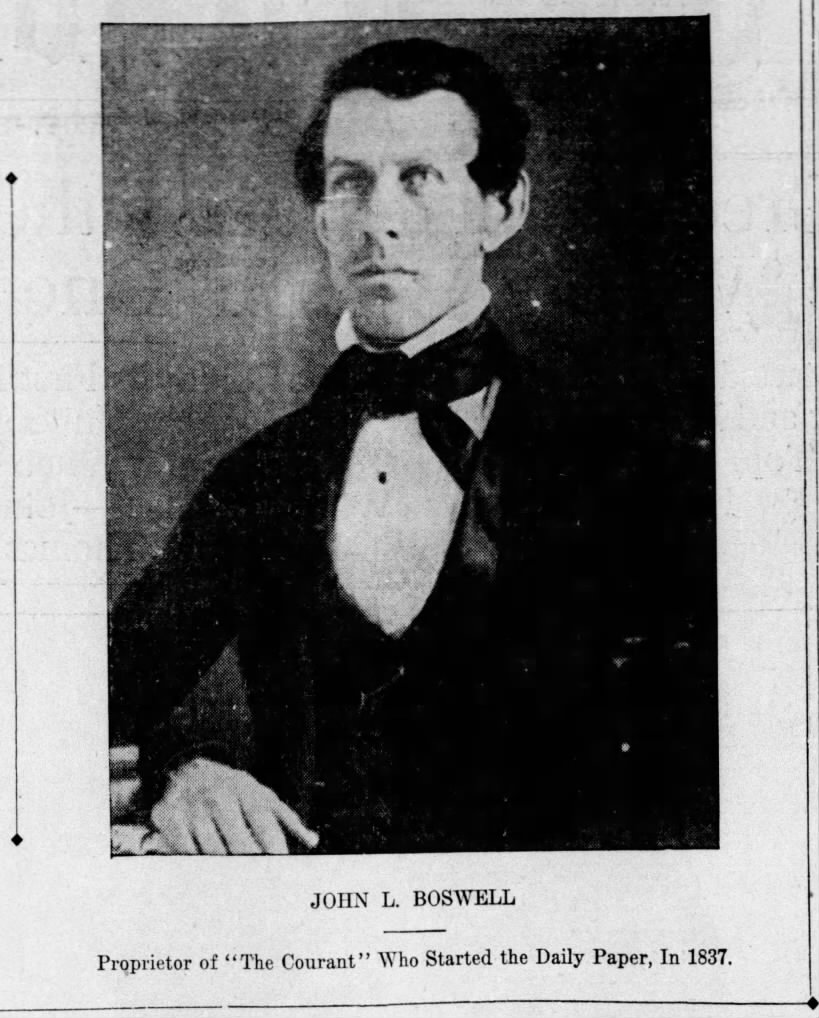
Picture of John L. Boswell (died July 30, 1854), founder of the newspaper, originally called The Daily Courant

Other newspapers claim to be the oldest in the country. The New Hampshire Gazette, which started publication in 1756, trademarked the slogan of oldest paper in the nation after being revived as a small biweekly paper in 1989. Prior to 1989, the paper had all but disappeared into other publications for most of the 20th century, which makes the slogan doubtful. The New York Post also claims to be the oldest continuously published daily newspaper. However, even though the Post started daily publishing 35 years before The Connecticut Courant did, the Courant existed as a weekly paper for nearly 40 years before the New York Post was founded, making the Courant older. Also The Providence Journal claims to be the oldest continuously published daily newspaper in the United States: the Journal began daily publishing 28 years after the New York Post, but some critics point at strikes at the Post in 1958 and 1978 as breaks in its continuity. Regardless, The Connecticut Courant existed as a weekly paper for nearly 70 years before The Providence Journal was founded.

In 1867, Joseph Roswell Hawley, a leading Republican politician and former governor of Connecticut, bought the newspaper, which he combined with the Press. Under his editorship, the Courant became the most influential newspaper in Connecticut and one of the leading Republican papers in the country.

An important figure in the history of the Courant is Emile Gauvreau, who became a reporter in 1916 and the managing editor in 1919. His energetic and often sensationalistic news style upset Charles Clark, the owner and editor. Clark fired Gauvreau when the journalist refused to stop a series of stories about false medical diplomas. Gauvreau would become later on a major figure in the New York City tabloid wars of the Roaring Twenties as the first managing editor of the New York Evening Graphic and later managing editor of the New York Daily Mirror.

Another prominent editor of the Courant in the 20th century is Herbert Brucker.

=== 2000s ===
The Courant was purchased in 1979 by Times Mirror, the Los Angeles Times' parent company, for $105.6 million. The first years of out-of-town ownership are described by Andrew Kreig, a former Courant reporter, in a book titled Spiked: How Chain Management Corrupted America's Oldest Newspaper. One criticism expressed by Kreig is that the new owners were more interested in awards, and less interested in traditional Courant devotion to exhaustive coverage of local news.

The Courant won a 1992 Pulitzer Prize for inquiring into problems with the Hubble Space Telescope (a Connecticut company was involved in the construction), and it won a 1999 Pulitzer Prize in the Breaking News category for coverage of a 1998 murder-suicide that took five lives at Connecticut Lottery headquarters. A series of articles about sexual abuse by the head of a worldwide Catholic order, published since February 1997, constituted the first denunciation of Marciel Maciel known to a wider audience.

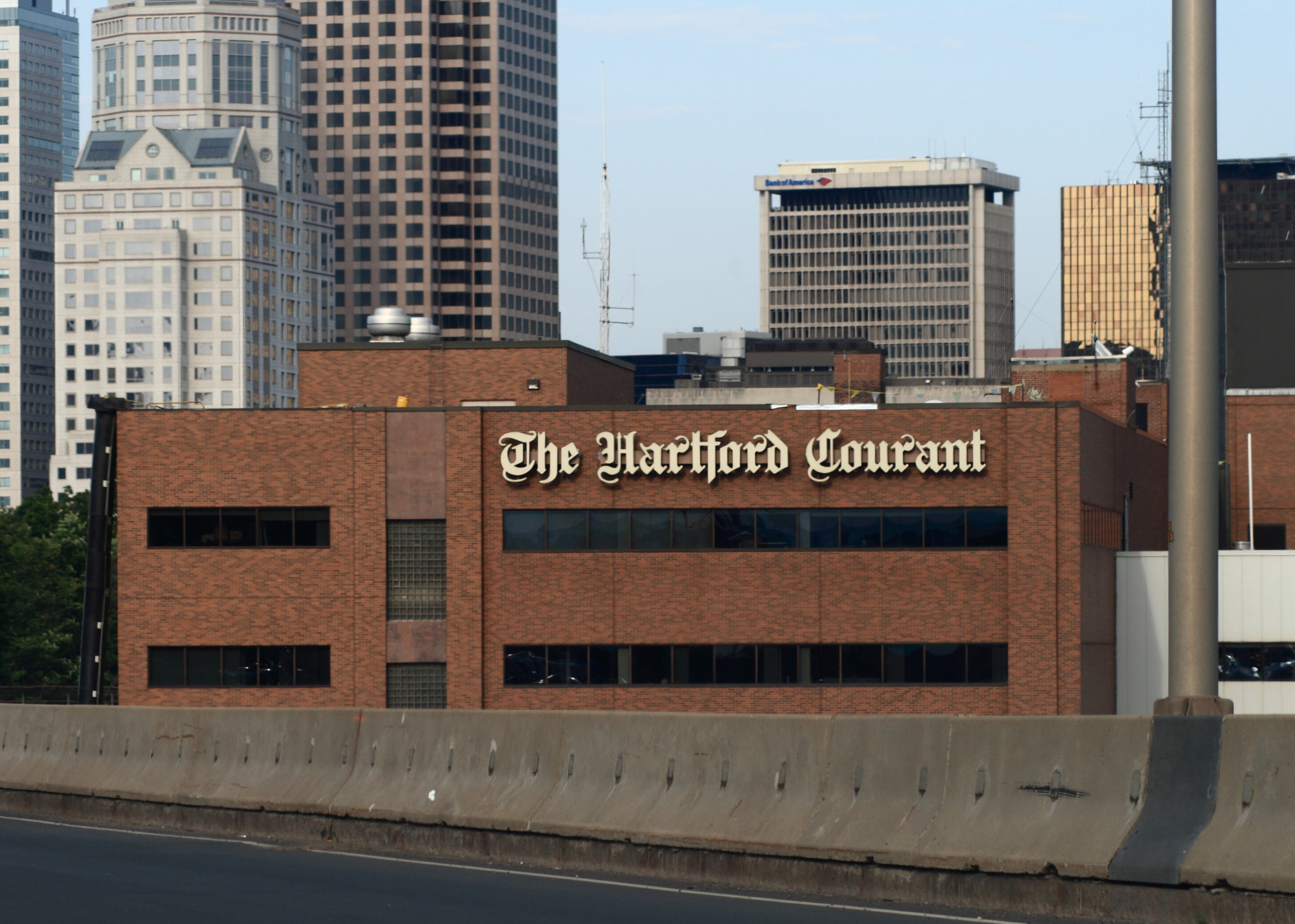
The current building of the Hartford Courant Co.

In 2000, Times Mirror and the Courant became part of the Tribune Company, one of the world's largest multimedia companies. By then the Courant had acquired the Valley Advocate group of "alternative" weeklies started by two former Courant staff members in 1973. Tribune also owned two local television stations: Fox affiliate WTIC-TV and The CW affiliate WCCT-TV.

In 2005, The Courant became the most recent American newspaper to win the Society for News Design's World's Best Designed Newspaper award. In 2006, the paper's investigation into mental health and suicides among Americans serving in the Iraq war was featured in the PBS documentary series Exposé: America's Investigative Reports in an episode entitled "Question 7."

In late June 2006, the Tribune Co. announced that Courant publisher Jack W. Davis Jr. would be replaced by Stephen D. Carver, vice president and general manager of Atlanta, Ga., TV station WATL. In March 2009, Tribune replaced Carver with Richard Graziano, who was given a dual role as Courant publisher and general manager of Tribune's two Hartford television stations. In May of the same year, Tribune announced that Jeff Levine, a newspaper executive with a background in marketing, would become "director of content" and that the editor or "print platform manager" of the Courant would report to Levine as would the news director of WTIC-TV. Shortly after that, the Courant's two highest ranking editors were let go.

After 2010, Courant has offered early retirement and buyout packages to reduce staff as it continues to experience declines in advertising revenue. There have also been layoffs and reduction in pages. Newsroom staff peaked in 1994 at close to 400 staff, down to 175 staff by 2008, and 135 staff in 2009.

Tribune Company brought frequent changes in the Courant's top leadership. On November 18, 2013, Tribune appointed Nancy Meyer as publisher, succeeding Rich Graziano who left to become president and general manager of WPIX-TV (PIX11) in New York City.

In 2014, the Courant purchased the ReminderNews chain of weekly newspapers. The Reminder name remained on the mastheads of all editions until November 2015, when the papers were redesigned and renamed Courant Community.

On October 10, 2014, Tribune Company announced the appointment of Rick Daniels as publisher of the Courant, succeeding Nancy Meyer, who was promoted to publisher and CEO of the Orlando Sentinel.

Andrew Julien was named the combined publisher and editor in March 2016, replacing Tom Wiley, who departed after two months.

In 2018, the Hartford Courant joined more than 300 newspapers in releasing editorials in response to President's Trump's anti-media rhetoric, a show of solidarity initiated by The Boston Globe. The paper stated, "The Hartford Courant joins newspapers from around the country today to reaffirm that the press is not the enemy of the American people."

In October 2020, the Courant announced that it would be discontinuing printing the paper in Hartford and outsourcing future printing to the Springfield Republican in Massachusetts.

In December 2020, Tribune Publishing announced that it would be closing the Courant's Broad Street newsroom by the end of the year with no current plans to open another. On its website as of 2023, the Courant lists its mailing address as 100 Pearl Street in Hartford.

In January 2024, it was announced Courant Community newspapers was to cease publication on January 18.

== Origins of the title ==
Journalist Denis Edward Horgan suggest that the title could derive from Dutch krant. The word, alternatively spelled courante, would be a contraction of Dutch courante nouvellen, from French nouvelles courantes, indicating current news articles. However, this Gallicism was already current in the English world and more specifically in the early modern newspaper industry. A case in point is the New-England Courant (Boston), founded by James Franklin in 1721.

== Current news and editorial board ==
- Executive editor: Helen Bennett
- Managing editor: Kellie Love
- Content editor: Kaitlin McCallum
- Sports editor: William Dayton

== Awards ==
=== Pulitzer Prize ===
Nancy Tracy of the Hartford Courant was a 1984 Pulitzer Prize Finalist in Feature Writing for her moving depiction of Meg Casey, a victim of premature aging.

Robert S. Capers and Eric Lipton of the Hartford Courant won the 1992 Pulitzer Prize in Explanatory Journalism for their series on how a flawed mirror built at Connecticut's Perkin-Elmer Corporation immobilized the Hubble Space Telescope.

The Hartford Courant Staff won the 1999 Pulitzer Prize in Breaking News Reporting for its coverage of a shooting rampage in which a state lottery employee killed four supervisors then himself.

Reporters Mike McIntire and Jack Dolan of the Hartford Courant were 2001 Pulitzer Prize Finalists in Investigative Reporting for their work in revealing the mistakes of practicing doctors who have faced disciplinary action.

Photojournalist Brad Clift was a 2003 Pulitzer Prize Finalist in Feature Photography for his photo series "Heroin Town", which depicted heroin use in Willimantic.

Lisa Chedekel and Matthew Kauffman of the Hartford Courant were 2007 Pulitzer Prize Finalists in Investigative Reporting for their in-depth reporting on suicide rates among American soldiers in Iraq which led to congressional and military action addressing the issues raised in the series.

The Hartford Courant staff was a 2013 Pulitzer Prize Finalist for its comprehensive and compassionate coverage of the Sandy Hook Elementary School shooting. The paper was given exclusive access originally to the investigative files collected by the FBI on the shooter's life growing up.

== Politics ==
The paper endorsed George W. Bush in both the 2000 and the 2004 Presidential elections.

In the 2012 Presidential Election, the Courant endorsed President Barack Obama for a second term over Republican Mitt Romney.

The Courant weighed in on the contentious and antagonistic 2016 presidential election, endorsing Democrat Hillary Clinton over Republican candidate Donald Trump.

In 2018 Connecticut gubernatorial election, the Courant endorsed Ned Lamont in the Democratic primary for Governor of Connecticut as the only "credible" choice compared to rival Joe Ganim. Lamont won the Democratic nomination, but the Courant went on to endorse independent candidate (and former Republican) Oz Griebel in the general election. Lamont won the election.

In the 2020 US presidential election, the Courant endorsed Democrat Joe Biden over Republican incumbent Donald Trump. The Courant took a stronger stance in its 2020 endorsement against Trump than it did in 2016, arguing that a vote for Trump was a vote for racism.

== Controversies ==
=== Sleepy's ===
In August 2009, the Courant attracted controversy over its firing of George Gombossy, a 40-year veteran of the paper and its consumer advocate at the time. Gombossy charged that the Courant had spiked an article he had written about an ongoing investigation by the Connecticut attorney general accusing Sleepy's (a major advertiser in the paper) of selling used and bedbug-infested mattresses as new.

Gombossy's lawsuit against the Courant was thrown out by a Connecticut Superior Court judge in July 2010. In his decision, Judge Marshall K. Berger Jr. remarked that newspaper owners and editors have a "paramount" right to "control [the] content of their papers," further observing that in his role at the Courant, Gombossy had "no constitutional right to publish anything."

However, Gombossy's attorneys filed a second complaint, and Judge Berger reinstated the complaint. The case headed to trial in the fall of 2011. "In late 2011 the suit was resolved," according to Gombossy's CTWatchdog website.

=== Plagiarism ===
In September 2009 the Courant's publisher, Richard Graziano, publicly apologized as the newspaper accepted a plagiarism charge. Competitors had accused the Courant of taking its content without permission and refusing to give proper credit.

=== Website blockage in the European Union ===
In 2018, the Hartford Courant began banning users of the internet in the European Union from accessing its website because of its absence of data protection compliance.
