= Jazz & Pop =

American music magazine

- Cover of the October 1967 issue of Jazz & Pop, featuring Milton Glaser's illustration of Bob Dylan
- Editor: Pauline Rivelli
- Categories: Music
- Frequency: Monthly
- Founded: 1962
- Final issue: 1971
- Company: Jazz Press
- Country: United States
- Based in: New York City
- Language: English
- ISSN: 0021-5627

Jazz & Pop was an American music magazine that operated from 1962 to 1971. It was launched as Jazz and managed by Pauline Rivelli, with finance provided by Bob Thiele, the producer of jazz artists such as Duke Ellington, John Coltrane, Louis Armstrong, Earl Hines and Count Basie. The publication served as a rival title to Down Beat magazine, which had been established in the 1930s.

The title of the publication changed to Jazz & Pop in August 1967. Like Down Beat, the magazine began to cover popular music as a result of the widespread cultural recognition afforded the genre following the release of the Beatles' Sgt. Pepper's Lonely Hearts Club Band; in turn, mainstream American publications increasingly adopted jazz-style critiques to analyse rock music. With the change of name, the magazine's editorial focus widened to include jazz music, rock, folk and blues.

In its original incarnation as Jazz, the magazine's staff included jazz critics Don Heckman, George Hoefer, John Mehegan and Stanley Dance, while New York–based freelancers such as Don Riker also contributed. From 1967 to 1970, its rock contributors included Gene Sculatti, Lenny Kaye and David G. Walley. Also a musician, Kaye wrote an article on the doo-wop genre in Jazz & Pop that led to the start of his successful collaboration with singer and poet Patti Smith. Between 1968 and 1971, the editor of the magazine was Patricia Kennealy, who became romantically involved with Jim Morrison of the Doors after interviewing him for Jazz & Pop. Robert Levin worked as the magazine's jazz editor, while Frank Kofsky and D.C. Hunt also contributed jazz-related articles in the late 1960s. When Ritchie Yorke wrote an article for the magazine disparaging rock critics, particularly Rolling Stone writer John Mendlesohn, it led to a terse response from Mendlesohn in the February 1971 issue of Phonograph Record, as he sought to justify his seemingly harsh approach to album reviews.

From its early years of operation, the magazine published an annual international critics poll. Referring to the 1967 poll, the website rockcritics.com recognizes it as originating from "right at the dawn of rock criticism". The Pazz & Jop annual poll, founded by Village Voice critic Robert Christgau in 1971, was named in acknowledgement of the magazine. The ratings system used by Jazz & Pop was also adopted for Christgau's poll.

== See also ==
- Jazz journalism
- Music criticism
- Rock criticism
