= Peaches & Daddy =

2008 non-fiction book

Peaches and Daddy: A Story of the Roaring '20s, the Birth of Tabloid Media, and the Courtship that Captured the Hearts and Imaginations of the American Public
- Author: Michael M. Greenburg
- Language: English
- Publisher: Overlook Press
- Publication date: 2008
- Pages: 320
- ISBN: 978-1-59020-046-9

Peaches & Daddy: A Story of the Roaring 20s, the Birth of Tabloid Media, & the Courtship that Captured the Heart and Imagination of the American Public is a 2008 book about the marriage of real estate multimillionaire and magnate Edward W. "Daddy" Browning and Frances Heenan “Peaches” Browning. It was written by Michael M. Greenburg and published by Overlook Press.
