= Scandal for Sale =

1932 film

- Directed by: Russell Mack
- Written by: Emile Gauvreau; Ralph Graves; Robert Keith
- Produced by: E.M. Asher; Carl Laemmle Jr.
- Starring: Charles Bickford; Rose Hobart; Pat O'Brien
- Cinematography: Karl Freund
- Edited by: Robert Carlisle
- Music by: David Broekman
- Production company: Universal Pictures
- Distributed by: Universal Pictures
- Release date: April 1, 1932
- Running time: 75 minutes
- Country: United States
- Language: English

Scandal for Sale is a 1932 American pre-Code drama film directed by Russell Mack and starring Charles Bickford, Rose Hobart and Pat O'Brien. The film's sets were designed by the art director Charles D. Hall. The plot is adapted from Emile Gauvreau's novel, "Hot News", which drew from Gauvreau's personal experiences as a newspaper editor. While the film's title suggests a deep dive into the world of journalism, it somewhat glosses over the novel's intricate commentary, especially when compared to contemporaneous films like "Five Star Final" (1931), which approached the subject matter with more intensity.

== Plot ==
A tenacious city editor, Jerry Strong, is eager to employ sensationalist tactics to boost newspaper sales. Lured by a $25,000 incentive from publisher, Strong starts to insert fabricated news into his publication. Amidst this, he learns of an intimate relationship between his top reporter, Waddell, and his own estranged wife, Claire. In a twist, Strong assigns Waddell to cover a risky trans-Atlantic flight, which culminates in Waddell's tragic demise. Holding her husband responsible, Claire contemplates leaving Strong. Yet, he pleads for a second chance, suggesting they return to their hometown for a simpler, more contented existence.

== Cast ==
- Charles Bickford as Jerry Strong
- Rose Hobart as Claire Strong
- Pat O'Brien as Waddell
- Berton Churchill as Bunnyweather
- J. Farrell MacDonald as Treadway
- Buster Phelps as Bobby Strong
- Betty Jane Graham as Mildred Strong
- Tully Marshall as Simpkins
- Claudia Dell as Dorothy Pepper
- Harry Beresford as Brownie
- Hans von Twardowski as Affner
- Mitchell Harris as Carrington

== Bibliography ==
- Colin Schindler. Hollywood in Crisis: Cinema and American Society 1929-1939. Routledge, 2005.
