= Emile Gauvreau =

American journalist (1891–1956)

Emile Gauvreau (1891–1956) was an American journalist, newspaper and magazine editor and author of novels and nonfiction books. He is best known as editor of two of New York's entertainment and sensation oriented "jazz age" tabloid newspapers.

== Early life ==
Gauvreau was born in Centerville, Connecticut.

== Career ==
Gauvreau got his start in newspapers at the New Haven Journal-Courier. In 1916, he moved on to the Hartford Courant, as a reporter, becoming legislative reporter, Sunday editor and assistant managing editor. Reference sources say he became managing editor at age 25, but there may be an error in either that age, his birthday, or the year he began working at the Courant.

He launched the newspaper's Artgravure Picture section and its Sunday magazine, and developed a strong partiality for the banner headline. His sensational style led to his dismissal from the newspaper in 1924 over a series alleging that medical quacks were operating in the state with credentials from diploma mills. He was asked for his resignation, but left with strong finances, thanks to his company stock.

Having helped compensate for a lame leg with exercises from Physical Culture publisher Bernarr Macfadden, and having written confession-style stories for Macfadden's True Story magazine, Gauvreau went to New York to inquire about freelancing for Macfadden publications. He did not expect to be offered the opportunity to start a daily tabloid newspaper for Macfadden, he wrote. It was to compete with the New York Daily News, America's first tabloid, which was soon joined by Hearst New York Daily Mirror. Macfadden had wanted to call his tabloid The Truth, but eventually settled for New York Evening Graphic, with Gauvreau as managing editor.

Along with crime stories, photos, and Macfadden's health crusades, its experimental policies included first-person stories by ghostwriter-assisted newsmakers, and composite photos that illustrated scenes for which the paper could not get a real photograph. In his autobiography, Gauvreau, who had drawn newspaper cartoons in his early days, took both credit and blame for the composograph, and admitted getting carried away with it, especially when creating farcical bedroom scenes to accompany stories about a sensational divorce case.

He took some of the credit for discovering and promoting Graphic staff members Walter Winchell, Ed Sullivan and others. Sullivan was sports editor before replacing Winchell on the Broadway column. Later, Sullivan went to the Daily news, and both Winchell and Gauvreau left the Graphic for Hearst's Daily Mirror, continuing a longtime editor-columnist feud into the 1930s.

Gauvreau's 1935 book about a trip to Russia, What So Proudly We Hailed, got him fired by Hearst, but he continued to write, and later edited a pictorial magazine, Click, for Moses Annenberg of The Philadelphia Inquirer.

His books, starting with two quasi-autobiographical novels about "tabloidia", include Hot News (1931), The Scandalmonger (1932), What So Proudly We Hailed (1935), Dumbells and Carrot Strips (with Mary Macfadden, 1935), My Last Million Readers (1941), Billy Mitchell: founder of our Air Force and Prophet Without Honor (1942), and The Wild Blue Yonder: Sons of the Prophet Carry On ( with Lester Cohen, 1945).

Gauvreau was profiled by Michael Shapiro for the Columbia Journalism Review in 2011, under the title The Paper Chase, compassionately compressing Gauvreau's 488-page My Last Million readers to magazine-story length.
