= Robert Levin (writer) =

American jazz critic and writer of fiction and essays (born 1939)

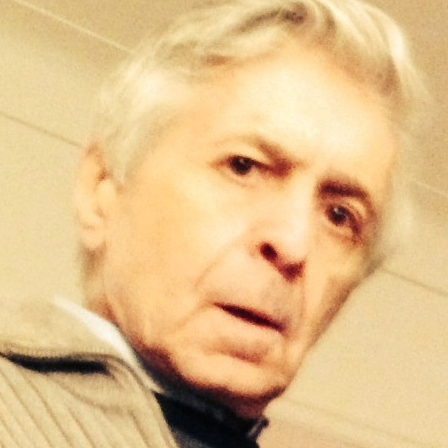
- Born: January 20, 1939 (age 87); New York, New York
- Writing career
- Genres: Fiction, Essays, Jazz Criticism

Robert Levin (born January 20, 1939, New York, New York) is an American jazz critic and writer of fiction and essays.

The author of When Pacino’s Hot, I’m Hot: A Miscellany of Stories & Commentary, Against Mental Health: Short Stories, The Killer and Other Stories, A Robert Levin Reader and Going Outside: Fiction • Commentary • Jazz, he is also the co-author and coeditor, respectively, of two collections of essays about jazz and rock in the 1960s: Music & Politics (with John Sinclair) and Giants of Black Music (with Pauline Rivelli).

In addition, his fiction and essays have appeared in a number of collections, including: Twenty-Minute Fandangoes and Forever Changes, Best of Nuvein Fiction, the Word Riot 2003 Anthology, Unlikely Stories of the Third Kind, Unspeakable—a PulpCult Anthology Of Contemporary Fiction, and ...Musings on a Manic Reality.

His comedic short story "When Pacino's Hot, I'm Hot" published in Retort Magazine was named a notable online short story for 2004 by the Million Writers Award. Another story, "The Hideous Summer", was nominated for a Pushcart Prize.

A staunch and sometimes bellicose defender of the free jazz movement of the 1960s, Levin wrote for The Village Voice (where his regular column played a significant role in establishing an audience for Cecil Taylor), Rolling Stone, Down Beat, Metronome, American Record Guide and Jazz & Pop (of which he was jazz editor).

Levin's Village Voice article "200,000 Invisible Men" (in which he questioned the tactics and ultimate value of the 1963 March on Washington) drew letters to the editor for the better part of a year and was quoted and discussed in a Norman Mailer Esquire column.

Characterized by Nat Hentoff as "a writer from whom I always learn something." Levin also wrote some 100 liner notes for Blue Note Records, Prestige Records, Impulse Records, and United Artists Records, encompassing albums by the likes of such artists as Miles Davis, John Coltrane, Thelonious Monk, Sonny Rollins, Cecil Taylor and Coleman Hawkins. Levin has said of his liner notes, many of which were written before he was twenty-one: "They’re all still out there and I wish I could rewrite every last one of them—especially the notes for [Coltrane’s] Blue Train."
