= Hy Peskin =

American photographer (1915–2005)

Hyman Peskin (November 5, 1915 – June 2, 2005) was an American photographer known for several famous photographs of American sports people and celebrities published by Sports Illustrated and Life. He was a pioneer of sports photography, with his work being ranked amongst the best sports photojournalism of the 20th century. In 1966 he changed his name to Brian Blaine Reynolds, and founded the Academy of Achievement, bringing young people together with statesmen and Nobel Prize winners.

== Early life ==
Peskin was born to Russian Jewish immigrant parents in Brooklyn, where his father Elias Peskowitz was a tailor who lost his job in the Depression, the family being saved by Hy's first job as a newspaper seller.

Peskin became a newspaper journalist at the New York Daily Mirror after it started up in 1924, but soon became a photographer because it paid a higher salary.

Sports photographers would work from the press box, limiting the pictures they could take. Peskin was the first sports photographer to cover the action from the sideline or climb up on the roof to obtain more interesting shots. In his early days, he was known for the photographs he took of the Brooklyn Dodgers from Ebbets Field. Peskin often said "I helped make the Dodgers famous and they helped make me".

After serving in the Marines during World War II, he wanted to start work as a magazine photographer using color. He applied for positions with 20 magazines but only Look showed any interest. It offered him a job after showing the photo editor pictures of a boxing match he had taken showing the blood on one boxer's face.

Peskin was the first staff photographer hired by Sports Illustrated. "The number of famous pictures that he made here is astonishing," Steve Fine, the director of photography at Sports Illustrated told The New York Times. His picture of Ben Hogan playing a 1-iron shot to the green at the 72nd hole of the 1950 US Open was ranked by Sports Illustrated as one of the greatest sports photographs of the twentieth century. "Instead of following every other shooter to the green, Hy hung back and took his shot from behind Hogan," recalled longtime Sports Illustrated photographer Neil Leifer in an essay in the magazine. "You don't even see Hogan's face, yet it's all there: that perfect swing, his signature cap, the crowd. It's one of the most iconic sports photos ever taken, and Hy got it on one of the most important swings of Hogan's career. That was Hy: always defining an epic moment with an epic picture."

Another of Peskin's photographs is said to have inspired the set design for the film Rocky: boxer Carmen Basilio leaping into the arms of his cornermen after knocking out Tony DeMarco in their 1955 welterweight title fight. The black-and-white image walked "the line between reportage and film noir," according to Sports Illustrated.

In 1953, Peskin shot a Life cover and photographic feature of Senator John F. Kennedy and his fiancé Jacqueline Bouvier. These photos helped to promote Kennedy as a national figure and were Peskin's personal favorites.

During his career as a sports photographer, Peskin had 40 of his photographs appear on the front cover of Sports Illustrated. He finished his career on an unfortunate note when technical problems meant that he virtually took no photographs at the first title fight between Muhammad Ali and Sonny Liston in early 1964.

=== Academy of Achievement ===
In the early 1960s, Peskin became interested in other ventures and helped organize the World Series of Sports Fishing with Ted Williams. That year, he also launched the first gathering of what became the Academy of Achievement, a non-profit organization that brings leaders from various fields together with "young achievers" to inspire them to succeed. Under Peskin's leadership, the Academy attracted such prominent people as Elizabeth Taylor, Elie Wiesel, Linus Pauling, Johnny Cash and Willie Mays, among dozens of others—to receive awards and talk with top high school students. The Academy of Achievement is now run by his son, Wayne Reynolds.

By 1964, believing his Jewish name to be a liability in fundraising, Peskin legally became known as Brian Blaine Reynolds—using the middle names of his three sons.

== Later life ==
In later years, Peskin lived in California and Plano, Texas. His first wife, Blanche, died in 1978. Peskin became known as such a litigious person, usually representing himself in court, that in 1995 a Texas television station did a story about his frequent court cases. He served time in a Texas jail for contempt of court.

== Death ==
Peskin died in Herzliyya, Israel in 2005 of technical errors occurring during kidney dialysis. He was survived by his second wife, Adriana Reynolds of Plano, Texas, and Herzliya, Israel; two sons from that marriage, Brian Jeremy Reynolds and Preston Blaine Reynolds, both of Herzliya and Plano; three sons from his first marriage, Evan Reynolds of McKinney, Texas, Ron Reynolds (deceased) of Vista, California, and Wayne Reynolds of McLean, Virginia; and granddaughter Stephanie Reynolds of Austin, Texas.
