= New York Graphic =

Tabloid newspaper, 1924 - 1932

New York Evening Graphic
- Front page of the New York Evening Graphic; September 5, 1931
- Type: Daily
- Format: Tabloid
- Publisher: Macfadden Publications
- Founded: 1924
- Ceased publication: 1932
- Language: English
- Headquarters: New York City

The New York Evening Graphic was a tabloid newspaper published from 1924 to 1932 by Macfadden Publications. Exploitative and mendacious in its short life, the Graphic exemplified tabloid journalism and launched the careers of Walter Winchell, Louis Sobol, and sportswriter-turned-columnist and television host Ed Sullivan.

== History ==
The New York Evening Graphic's founding editor was investigative reporter Emile Gauvreau, who grew up in Connecticut and in Montreal, Quebec, the eldest son of an itinerant French Canadian war hero. Gauvreau, a high school drop-out, began his journalism career as a cub reporter on the New Haven Journal-Courrier — alongside part-time Yalies such as Sinclair Lewis — during World War I, and by 1919, had moved on to become the youngest managing editor in the history of the Hartford Courant after only three years on the job. He was fired when an investigative project embarrassed "Boss" Roraback, Connecticut's state Republican utilities tycoon J. Henry Roraback. In 1924, Gauvreau made his way to New York to seek his fortune on The New York Times under Carr Van Anda, when, as he relates in My Last Million Readers, he was introduced to Macfadden through the publisher's editor in chief, Fulton Oursler, an almost chance encounter which became "the most violent turning point of my life."

My departure from the Courant, as a result of the medical diploma-mill revelations had injected my name into newspaper stories of investigation. A number of those accounts pictured me as some sort of martyr. MacFadden, who had no use for doctors, quack or legitimate, was keenly interested in the fight I was waging. As a result of our conference I was engaged to organize an afternoon tabloid newspaper to be published in New York under the name The Truth.(...) He spoke of his projected newspaper as a crusading daily, which would tell the truth under all circumstances, and I listened to him with enthusiasm."

== Notable content ==
From the beginning, the paper featured a gossip column by Walter Winchell and when he quit in 1929, Louis Sobol. In 1931, Ed Sullivan, who had authored a sports column entitled "Sport Whirl", debuted his column, Ed Sullivan Sees Broadway. Film director Sam Fuller worked for The Graphic as a crime reporter. Ernie Bushmiller created the comic strip Mac the Manager at the Graphic prior to his creation of the Nancy comic strip.

The Graphic, which sported the motto "Nothing But the Truth", often exploited a montage technique known as the composograph to create "photographs" of events it could not obtain actual photos of, such as Rudolph Valentino's corpse, or Valentino's spirit being greeted in heaven by Enrico Caruso.

Historians Bill Blackbeard and Martin Williams described the Graphic as "possibly the most iconoclastically innovative newspaper in American history," while lamenting its relative absence from Library collections. Writing in 1977, they were fearful that copies of the paper "ha[ve] apparently not survived at all; there may be no file of that paper, public or private, left on earth".

In his 1931 autobiographical novel, Hot News, Gauvreau takes personal credit for the invention and for launching "a new chapter in the history of tabloid journalism". Gauvreau, the Graphic's contest editor Lester Cohen, and Fulton Oursler, Macfadden Publications' second-in-command, later claimed the images were intended to catch attention, present the news in pictorial form, and sell newspapers, but not to deceive. Gauvreau, however, said his staff had to create news to maintain its circulation, and composograph pictorials helped move things along. "We could no longer wait for calamities to happen. "Characters were built up and paraded. Hot news became the wild, blazing, delirious symptom of the time." Cohen credits art department staff member Harry Grogin as "the inventor of the composite picture."

In 1929, Time magazine in a profile of Winchell, wrote:

Not all readers of that gum-chewers' sheetlet, the New York Graphic, are gum-chewers. Some of them smuggle the pink-faced tabloid into Park Avenue homes, there to read it in polite seclusion. They have reason: the Graphic's gossip-purveying, scandal-scooping, staccato-styled Monday column, "Your Broadway and Mine.

Further evidence that the Graphic was secretly enjoyed by the intelligentsia is provided by a 1929 Cole Porter lyric, in which the heroine asks "Should I read Euripides or continue with the Graphic?"

== Criticism ==
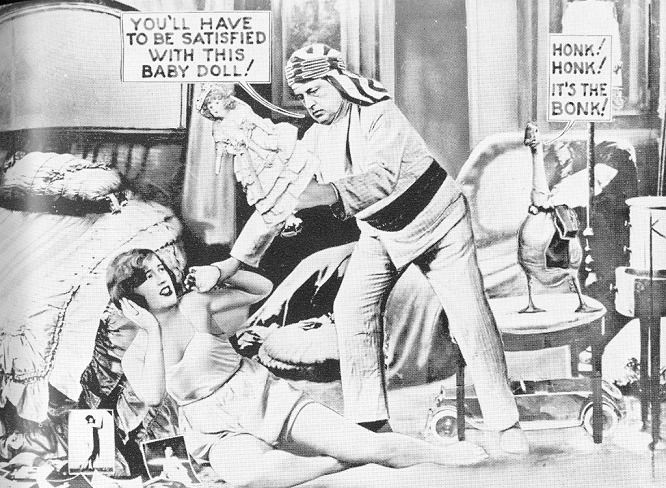
N.Y. Evening Graphic composograph illustrating article exploiting the Peaches & "Daddy" Browning scandal of 1926.

The Graphic was dubbed the "pornoGraphic" by critics of the time and journalist Ben Yagoda in 1981 called the trashy, enormously popular daily, "one of the low points in the history of American journalism", offering sample headlines: "Aged Romeo Wooed Stage Love with a Used Ring", "Weed Parties in Soldiers' Love Nest", and "Two Women in Fight, One Stripped, Other Eats Bad Check". Yagoda quotes "one reader" as saying "The only value ever claimed for it was that it educated readers up to a point where they were able to understand the other tabloids."

In 1930, Time, after saying that "Publisher Bernarr Macfadden's feelings are hurt by any suggestion that he or any of his publications are pornographic", added that recent Graphic headlines included "Girls Need Sex Life for Beauty" and "Rudy Vallee Not So Hot In Love's Arms".

Barry Popik notes that the New York Public Library believed the Graphic to be trashy and did not collect the issues, which are now lost."

== Decline ==
Despite the enormous popularity of its puzzle contests and lonely hearts page, the Graphic had trouble securing advertisers who feared being associated with the scandal-fed image of the pornoGraphic. Some advertisers claimed the Graphic's readers had no buying power. By 1929, however, the Graphic's racy editorial had become mainstream in New York's tabloidia, but competition with papers such as the Tribune's Daily News, William Randolph Hearst's Journal and New York Daily Mirror had become cutthroat and the Graphic's cost structure was out of control. The Great Depression further exacerbated the paper's economic troubles.

In Gauvreau's 1956 obit, Time filed a choice anecdote illustrating his freewheeling indifference:

He "exposed" the Atlantic City beauty contest as a "frame-up," thereby pushing the total libel suits filed against the Graphic to $12 million. When the treasurer complained wistfully, Gauvreau cracked: "Take it out of my salary.

Some half-hearted attempts at implementing cost-cutting measures – re-use of crossword puzzle engravings, for example – served only to alienate its loyal readership, and a dispirited Gauvreau met secretly with Hearst and signed on to take the helm at the Mirror.

As the Graphic began its final decline, Macfadden was also distracted by his risible and ultimately futile quest for the Republican presidential nomination. The Graphic finally folded on July 7, 1932, after years of losses, as much as $11,000,000, according to his wife and business partner, Mary Macfadden.

The Graphic's demise was precipitated by pressure from other rising New York tabloids and financial pressures throughout Macfadden's faltering publishing empire. Author Helen MacGill Hughes draws on Gauvreau's Hotnews to conclude that Macfadden's late entry into the tabloid game was a key contributing factor in the Graphic's difficulty in competing with the New York genre's first movers, Patterson's Daily News and Hearst's Mirror: "What does seem probable, however, is that the latter two already had most of the advertising suited to the sort of readers that tabloids attract."

== Aftermath ==
Lester Cohen, the paper's contest editor and Gauvreau confidante, chronicled its rise and fall in his 1964 book, The New York Graphic: The World's Zaniest Newspaper:

The paper was doomed by Macfadden's temperament. But it had the most brilliant staff, I think, of any paper of its time. That staff lived on to make some of the history, some of the books, some of the entertainment of the '30s, '40s, '50s, '60s. ... "Gauvreau tried to make it sensational," analyzed one of its employees, "Winchell tried to make it amusing, editor (Louis) Weitzenkorn tried to make it semirespectable, but it remained one thing overall: Macfadden."

Guavreau never tired of reminiscing on the phenomenon that was "the newspaper that never was," dwelling at length on his remarkable experience in his 1931 novel Hot News, a second novel, The Scandal Monger in 1932 (the basis for Universal's Scandal for Sale, 1932, starring Charles Bickford), his 1941 memoir, and later, in Dumbbells and Carrotstrips, a vilifying book on Macfadden himself, co-authored with Mary Macfadden, whom Bernarr Macfadden had sued for divorce in 1933.
