= African goose =

Goose breed

African
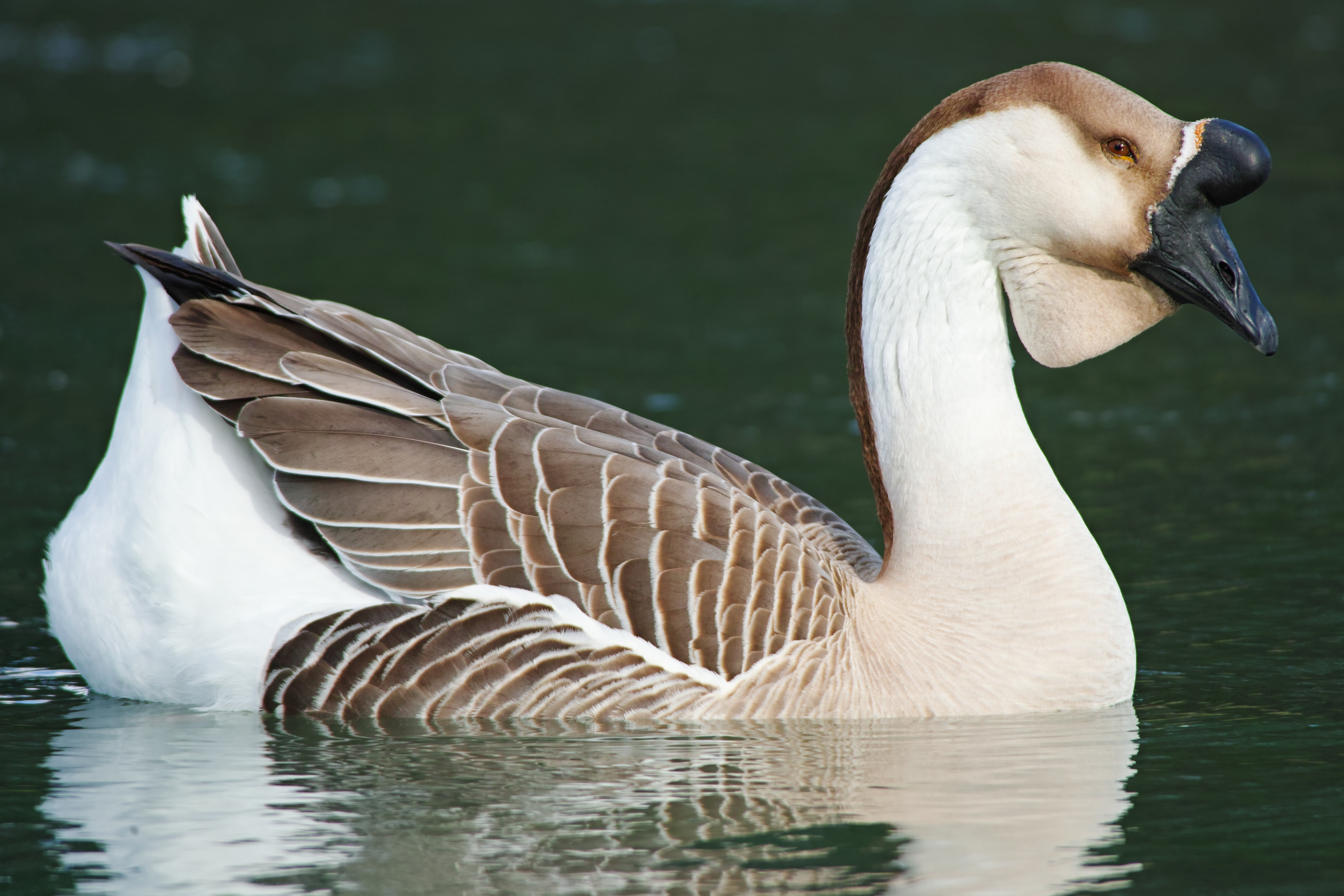
- African goose in Northern California
- Conservation status: FAO (2007): endangered; DAD-IS (2023): at risk; Livestock Conservancy (2023): watch; RBST (2023): not listed
- Other names: African Goose

Classification
- APA: heavy goose
- EE: yes
- PCGB: heavy

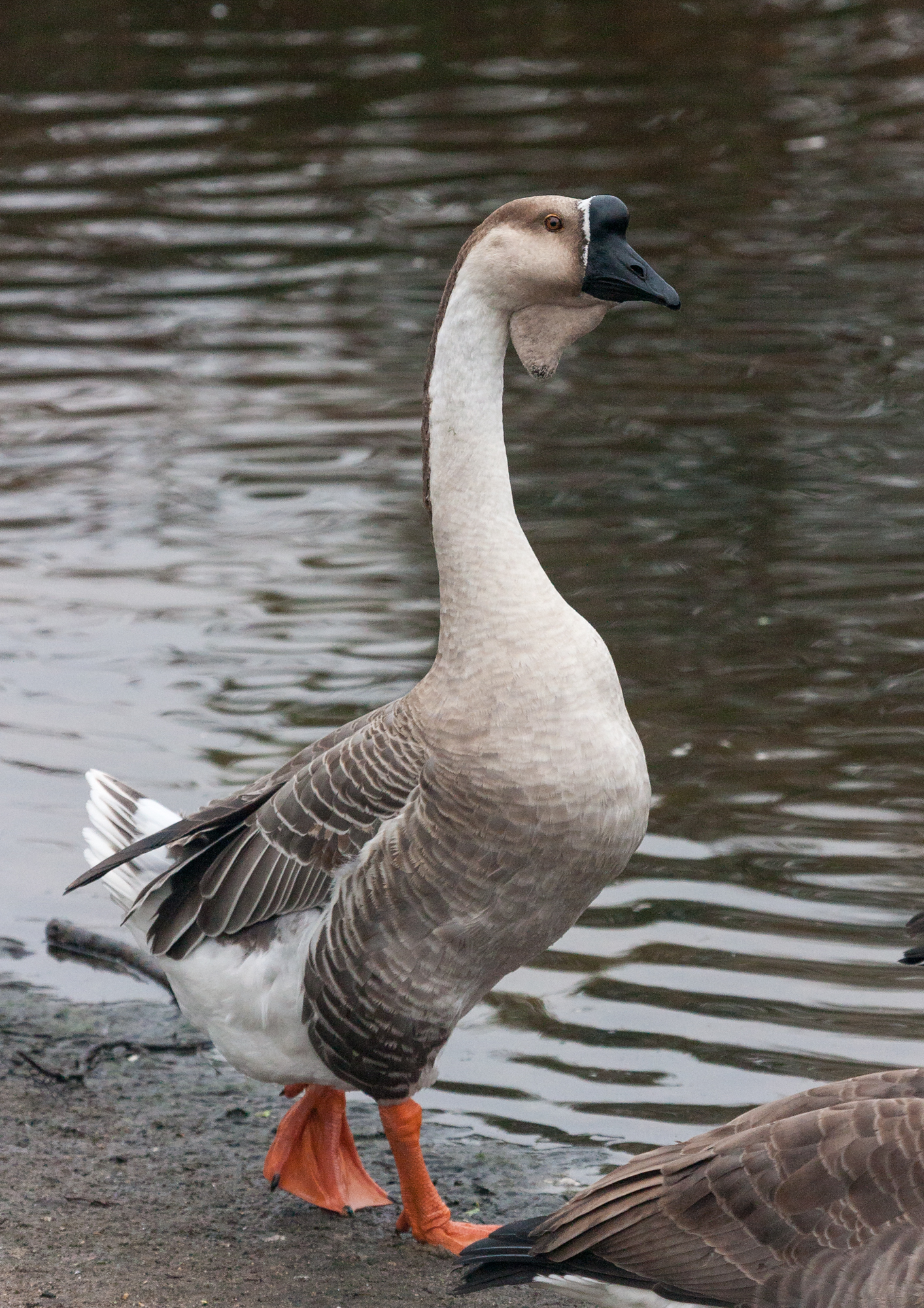
Brown African Goose

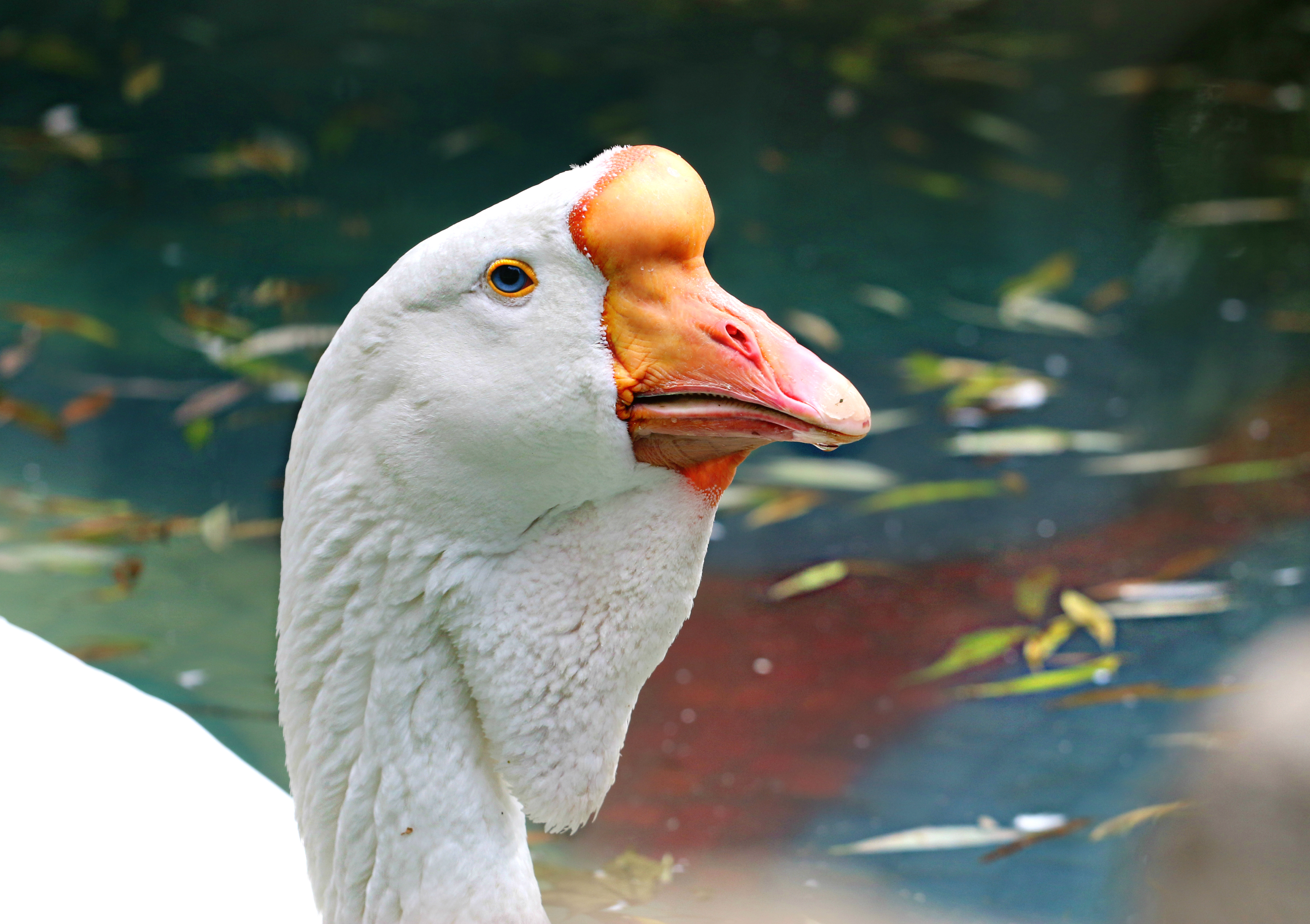
White African Goose

The African or African Goose is a breed of domestic goose. It is one of two domestic breeds that derive from the wild species Anser cygnoides, the other being the Chinese; all other domestic geese derive from Anser anser. Despite the name, it is not from Africa but is of Chinese origin, found in Teochew and Swatow of South China. It is a large bird, among the heaviest of all goose breeds.

== History ==
The African Goose is one of two domestic goose breeds that derive from the wild species Anser cygnoides, the other being the Chinese, to which it is closely related. Domestication took place in north Asia, and birds of this type were later brought to Europe, possibly via Madagascar; they were present in Britain before the end of the seventeenth century.

The brown variety was included in the first edition of the Standard of Perfection of the American Poultry Association in 1874; the white was added in 1987, and the buff in 2018.

== Characteristics ==
The African Goose is a large, heavy bird, among the heaviest of all goose breeds. According to the British standard, weights are approximately 8–11 kg for geese and 10–13 kg for ganders; the Bund Deutscher Rassegeflügelzüchter gives weights of 7 kg and 8 kg respectively. The birds may stand up to 90 cm tall. The body is large and is carried at about 35° to the horizontal; the back is long and fairly flat, the breast and belly smooth and rounded. The tail is held above the back-line, particularly in ganders. The head is large, with a large knob protruding forwards and upwards from the front of the head and the top of the upper mandible of the broad bill. The neck is long, thick and slightly arched, with a smooth crescent-shaped dewlap hanging below the lower mandible.

Three color varieties are recognised by the Poultry Club of Great Britain and the American Poultry Association: the grey or brown, the buff and the white. The brown has wild-type plumage, with colors ranging from light to dark grey-brown (or light ash to dark slate), with black bill and knob and dark or brownish-orange shanks and feet. The white has pure white plumage, with orange bill and knob and light orange legs, and the buff has the same plumage pattern as the brown, but in colors ranging from light fawn to buff; the legs and webs are a light dull orange, the knob and bill a pinkish brown. Only the grey/brown is recognised by the Entente Européenne d'Aviculture et de Cuniculture.

== Use ==
The African Goose is commonly reared for meat. Geese lay about 25 eggs per year; the eggs are white and weigh some 130 g. Ring size is 27 mm.
