= Michael M. Greenburg =

Michael M. Greenburg is an American attorney and writer. He has edited the Pepperdine Law Review. Greenburg has written a number of books, including The Great Miscalculation and The Mad Bomber of New York.
