= Composograph =

Method of photo manipulation

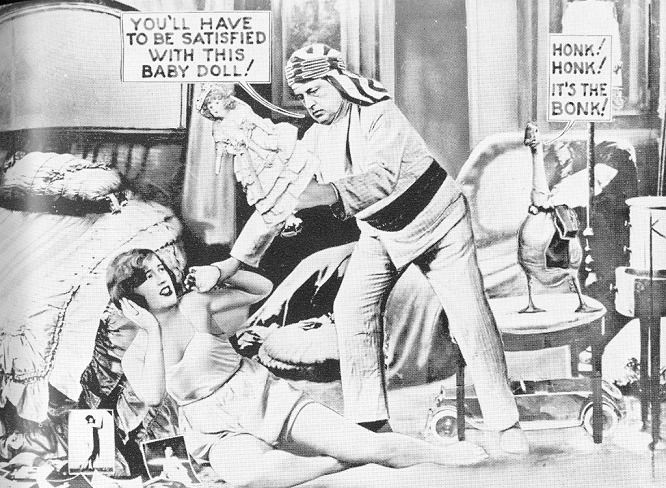
N.Y. Evening Graphic composograph illustrating article exploiting the Peaches & "Daddy" Browning scandal of 1926.

Composograph refers to a forerunner method of photo manipulation and is a retouched photographic collage popularized by publisher and physical culture advocate Bernarr Macfadden in his New York Evening Graphic in 1924.

The Graphic was dubbed "The Porno-Graphic" by critics of the time and has been called "one of the low points in the history of American journalism". Exploitative and mendacious, in its short life (it closed operations in 1932) the Graphic defined "tabloid journalism" and launched the careers of Ed Sullivan and Walter Winchell, who developed the modern gossip column there. Film director Sam Fuller worked for the Evening Graphic as a crime reporter.

"Composographic" images were literally cut and pasted together using images of the heads or faces of current celebrities, gluepasted onto staged images created in Macfadden's in-house studio, often using newspaper staffers as body doubles. Composite photographs, or photomontages, had been used in the nineteenth century by such photographers as William Notman to capture indoor scenes that would not have been otherwise possible before the flashbulb was developed.

Macfadden used them to represent events that were inconvenient to photograph, particularly with the equipment of the day: private bedrooms and bathtubs, Rudolph Valentino's unsuccessful surgery, Valentino's funeral, and notably on March 17, 1927, a full-page image of Valentino meeting Enrico Caruso in heaven. One early faked photograph—that of Alice Jones Rhinelander baring her breast in court (part of the Kip Rhinelander divorce trial)—is said to have boosted the Graphic's circulation by 100,000 copies.

Apart from their sensational subject matter, composographs have relevance as a historical reference point in the current debate over staged and doctored news photos. Some of the Graphic composographs have an unforgettable eerie visual impact. In a 1997 academic paper called "Staged, faked and mostly naked: Photographic innovations at the Evening Graphic, 1924–1932" and a shorter online essay, Radford University professor Bob Stepno points out that the Graphic was published before improvements in photojournalism technology and standards that made possible the photorealism of Magnum Photos, Black Star and others during World War II.
