= New York Daily Mirror =

Daily newspaper in New York City (1924–1963)

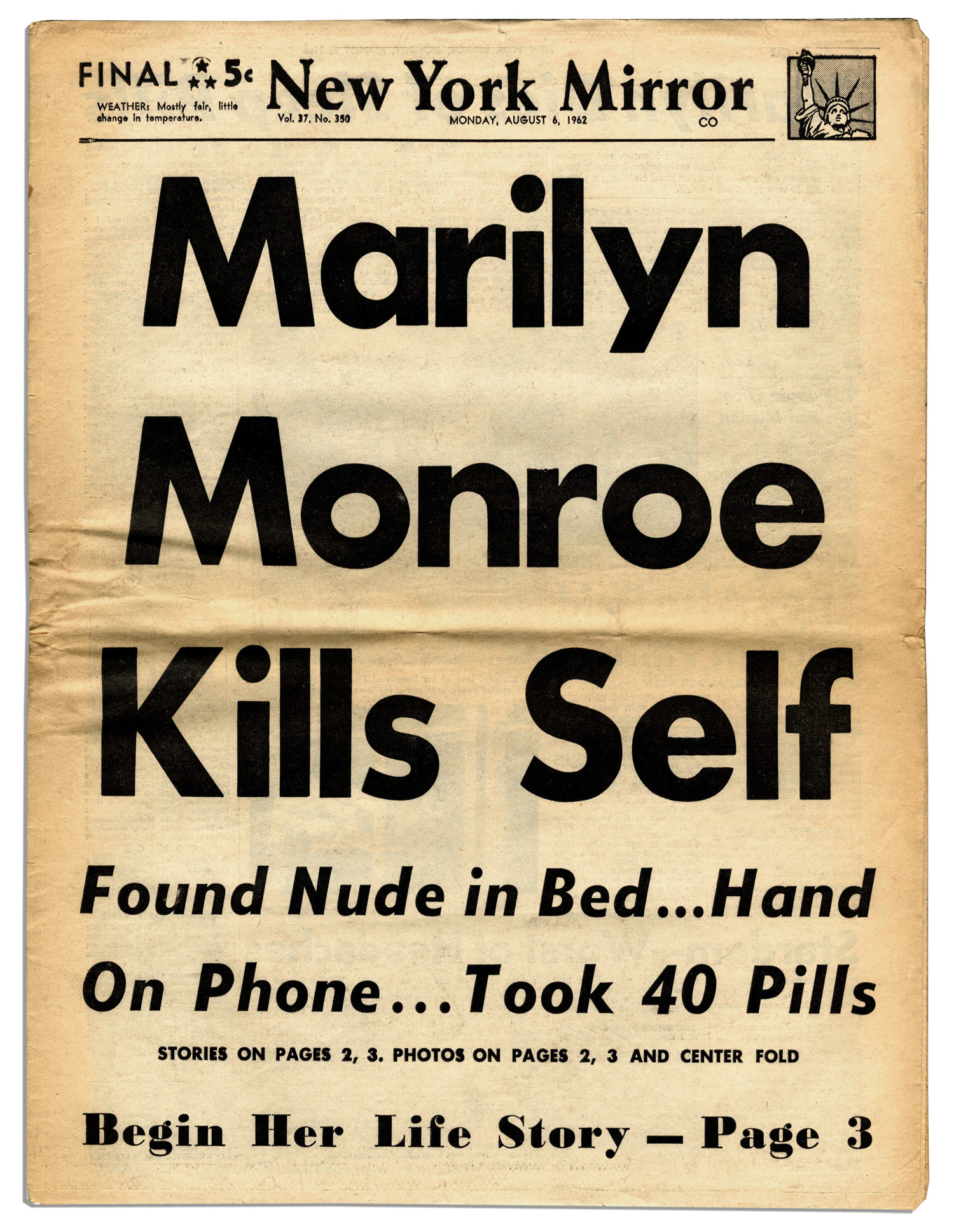
- New York Mirror front page heralding the death of Marilyn Monroe (6 August 1962)
- Type: Daily
- Format: Tabloid
- Owner: William Randolph Hearst
- Publisher: Hearst Corporation
- Managing editor: Philip Payne
- Founded: June 24, 1924; 101 years ago
- Ceased publication: October 16, 1963; 62 years ago
- Language: English
- Headquarters: New York City

The New York Daily Mirror was an American morning tabloid newspaper published in New York City by the William Randolph Hearst organization from 1924 to 1963. The Daily Mirror was published as a contrast to Hearst's mainstream broadsheets, the Evening Journal and New York American (later consolidated into the New York Journal American). It was created to compete with the New York Daily News, which was then a sensationalist tabloid and the most widely circulated newspaper in the United States.

== Overview ==
During the three tabloids (the Daily Mirror, the Daily News, and the New York Evening Graphic) 1920s circulation war, management of the Mirror estimated that its content was 10% news and 90% entertainment. For example, the Mirror and Graphic both had devoted substantial resources to the exploitation of scandal with repeated stories on such events as the divorce trial of real estate tycoon Edward West "Daddy" Browning, who at age 51 had married 16-year-old Frances Belle "Peaches" Heenan, as well as constant coverage of the decade's celebrities like Rudolph Valentino, Babe Ruth, and Charles A. Lindbergh.

Early on, several bright young writers and photographic journalists joined the Daily Mirror, such as Ring Lardner, Jr., Hy Peskin and the political commentator Drew Pearson. The poet-songwriter Nick Kenny was the paper's radio editor, and Edward Zeltner contributed a column. The gossip columnist Walter Winchell and managing editor Emile Gauvreau were both hired away from the Evening Graphic. Winchell was given his own radio show and syndicated, in his prime — the 1940s and early 1950s — in more than 2000 daily papers. Arthur H. Sloggatt served as the full-time political cartoonist from 1956 until the paper's closure in 1963.

By the mid-1930s, the Daily Mirror was one of the Hearst Corporation's largest papers in terms of circulation. The paper never became a significantly profitable property, however, as its earnings were mostly destined to support the company's faltering afternoon papers, and in its later years it declined substantially, despite numerous efforts to turn things around.

== History ==
The Daily Mirror was first published on June 24, 1924. Hearst hired Philip Payne away from the Daily News as managing editor of the Mirror. Payne's circulation-building stunts ranged from in 1926 reviving the sensational Hall–Mills murder case to sponsoring and being a passenger on the Old Glory, 1927 transatlantic flying record attempt — in which he was killed.

Hearst preferred the broadsheet format and sold the Mirror to an associate in 1928, only to buy it back in 1932.

Despite having the second-highest daily circulation of an American newspaper at the time, the Daily Mirror closed in 1963, after the 114-day 1962–63 New York City newspaper strike (which also contributed to the death of the Herald Tribune, the Journal-American and the World-Telegram and Sun). On October 16, 1963, the Daily Mirror published its last issue. The Mirror's management blamed the closure on the effects of the strike aggravating existing problems at the paper. The Daily Mirror name rights were at that point acquired by its rival the Daily News.

== 1971–1972 revival ==
On January 4, 1971, publisher Robert W. Farrell revived the New York Daily Mirror in name only, as a tabloid, published in Long Island City, Queens. Operating on a shoestring budget, the paper faced obstruction from the Daily News (from whom it had acquired the Daily Mirror name rights after the Daily News let them lapse). This new iteration of the Daily Mirror ceased publication on February 28, 1972.

== See also ==
- Arthur Brisbane
- Jack Lait
- Tex McCrary
- Lee Mortimer
- Sidney Skolsky
